= Mink industry in Denmark =

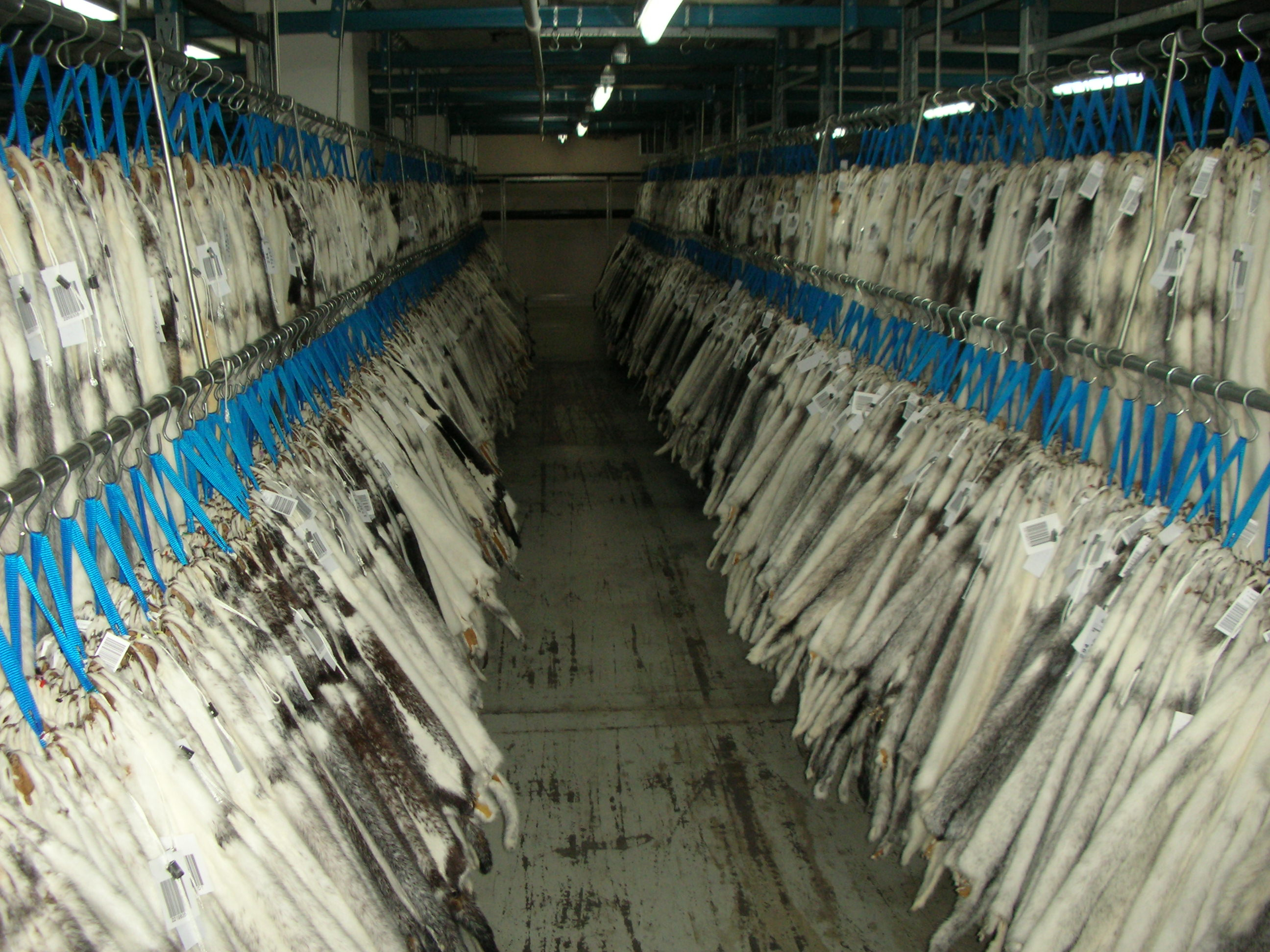
Mink pelts at Kopenhagen Fur.

The mink industry in Denmark produced 40 percent of the world's pelts. Denmark used to be the largest producer of mink skins in the world. Ranked third in Denmark's agricultural export items of animal origin, fur and mink skins have a yearly export value of about €500 million. Kopenhagen Fur, located in Copenhagen, is the world's largest fur auction house; annually, it sells approximately 14 million Danish mink skins produced by 2,000 Danish fur farmers, and 7 million mink skins produced in other countries. Mink produced in Denmark was considered to be the finest in the world and is ranked by grade, with the best being Saga Royal, followed by Saga, Quality 1, and Quality 2.

In November 2020, a mutated strain of COVID-19 known as "cluster 5" was detected among minks, leading the Danish Government to order the culling of 17 million minks in order to prevent a resurgence in COVID-19 cases, thus temporarily ending the mink industry in Denmark. Mink fur farming was made legal again in 2023.

== History ==
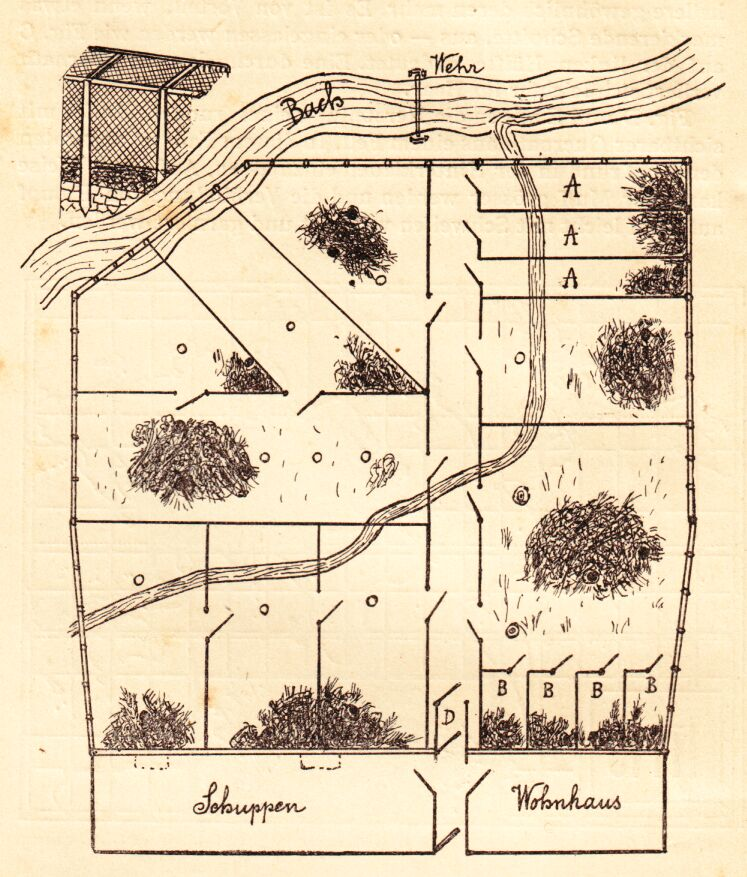
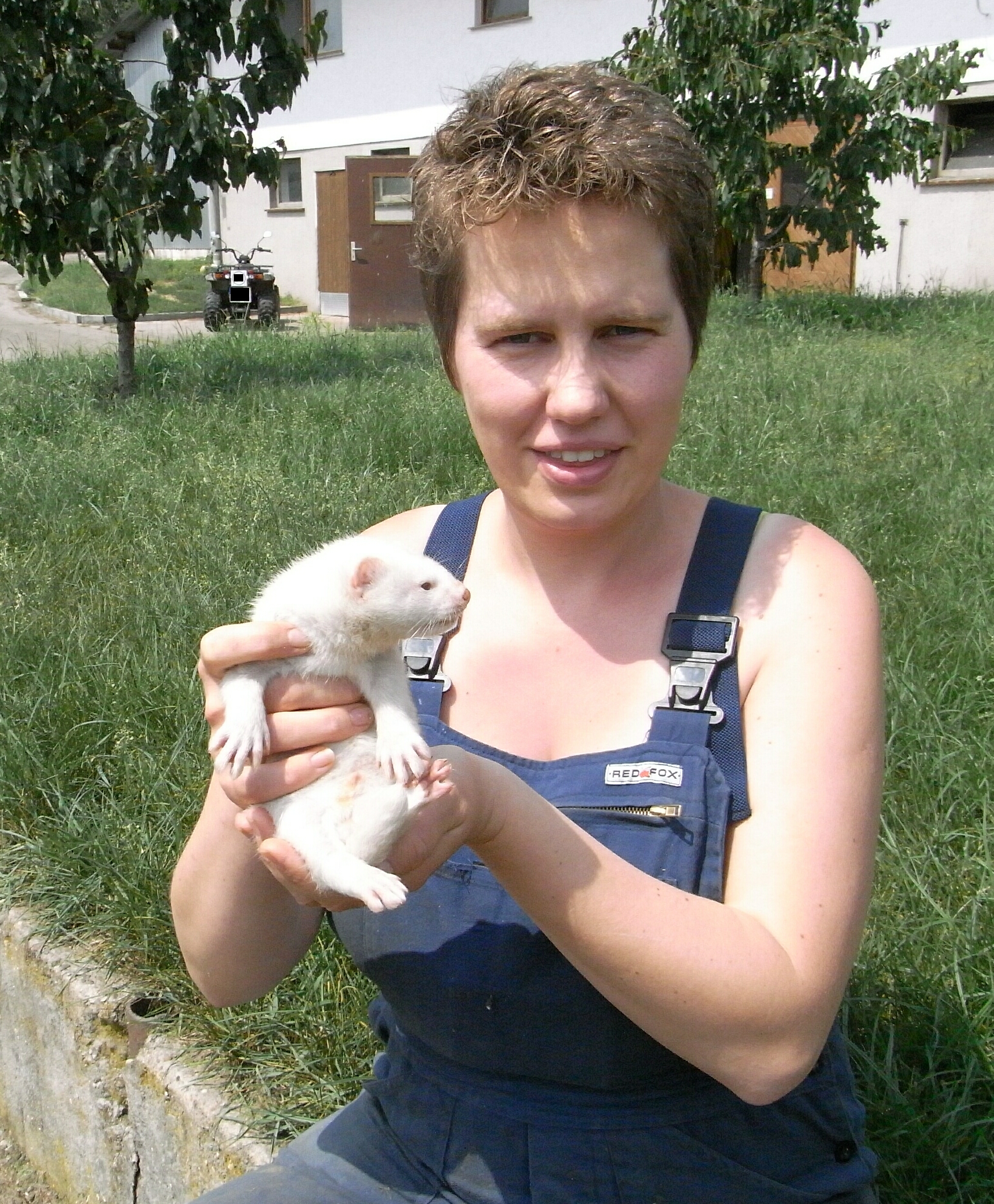
Left: A typical mink farm layout in 1908. Symbols on the sketch: "D" on the sketch marks the entry gate, areas marked "A" represent segregated cages for male and female minks and "O" represents the trees grown in the open space. Right: Mink breeder with a young pearl mink

American mink (Neogale vison) were introduced as a farm animal in Denmark in the mid-1920s – European mink (Mustela lutreola) have never been recorded in Denmark. By the mid-1980s, Denmark was the second largest mink producer, behind the United States. In 1983, it produced 8.3 million pelts, amounting to 22 percent of world production, and in 2002, it produced 12.2 million pelts, representing nearly 40 percent of world production. Fur trade has been declared as one of the twenty nine "special competence clusters in Danish economic life" by the Ministry of Commerce in Denmark.

=== COVID-19 ===
In November 2020, a mutated strain of COVID-19 was found in the animals, resulting in the government ordering the culling of seventeen million mink because of a fear that they could be the catalyst for restarting the international pandemic. At least twelve people have been infected by the mink farm strain though hundreds of cases could be linked to it. The new mutation is known as "cluster 5". In November 2020, the Danish government announced that all remaining mink in Denmark would be culled by 16 November 2020.

It was revealed in late November that the Minister for Agriculture, Mogens Jensen, and five other ministers had been made aware in September that the culling of the entire country's mink population, rather than just those in the infected areas, would be illegal. Facing calls for resignation from the parliamentary opposition and sharp public criticism, Prime Minister Mette Frederiksen acknowledged that the order to cull all minks was illegal, and Jensen resigned on 18 November. A deal was later reached to retroactively make the government's order legal.

On 20 December 2020, the Danish Parliament passed a draft bill to ban mink farming until 2022. Mink breeding became legal again in Denmark from 1 January 2023 onwards, and Icelandic mink are set to play a key role for Danish mink farmers.

== Farm production ==
Climatic conditions in Denmark, where the winter is mild and the summer is cool, are considered ideal for husbanding animals with fur cover. Fish waste from the fishing industry was used as feed at mink farms. A Danish mink farm might have 13,000 cages, set in rows of 60 metres (200 ft) length, and 43 sheds in which two to four minks were housed. Nesting boxes were attached inside the cage. Mink gave birth to their litter of generally five offspring in the nesting boxes; they also fed the litter in the nesting boxes. Using information technology, management, control, breeding and analysis could monitor genetic progress of the mink herd.

Kopenhagen Fur serves as a farmers' cooperative. Concerted efforts of Kopenhagen Fur and Danish Animal Welfare Society (Dyrenes Beskyttelse), have optimized the environmental conditions for mink farming by developing rules, which received approval by the Ministry of Justice in 2007. Danish fur farms produced about 15.6 million minks annually. Though the country had some of the largest mink farms in the world, it also had many small business mink farms run by families.

== Distribution ==
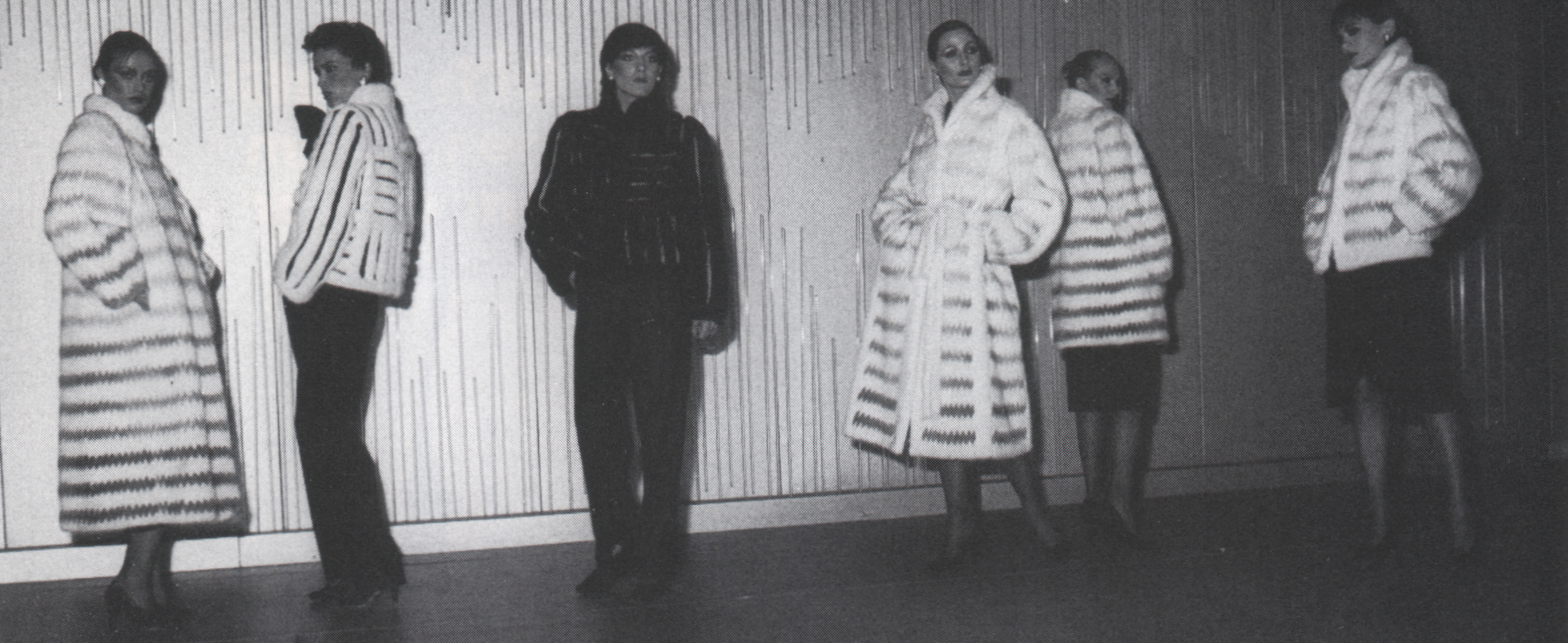
Fur coats by Birger Christensen

Mink fur of Denmark is exclusively auctioned through Kopenhagen Fur. Auctions are held five times in a year, with the first held in December after the newly pelted skins are ready, and the last in September. Each auction typically sells some 260 million euro worth of fur and lasts five days. Major export markets for Danish mink are China, Hong Kong, Japan, and Korea. In the December 2012 auction, there were 500 bidders with 85 percent of the pelts purchased by customers from China. Circa 2012, the average price per mink skin was 582 Danish crowns (US$100), then the highest price ever recorded at Kopenhagen Fur.
