= 2020 Danish mink cull =

Government-mandated slaughter of mink

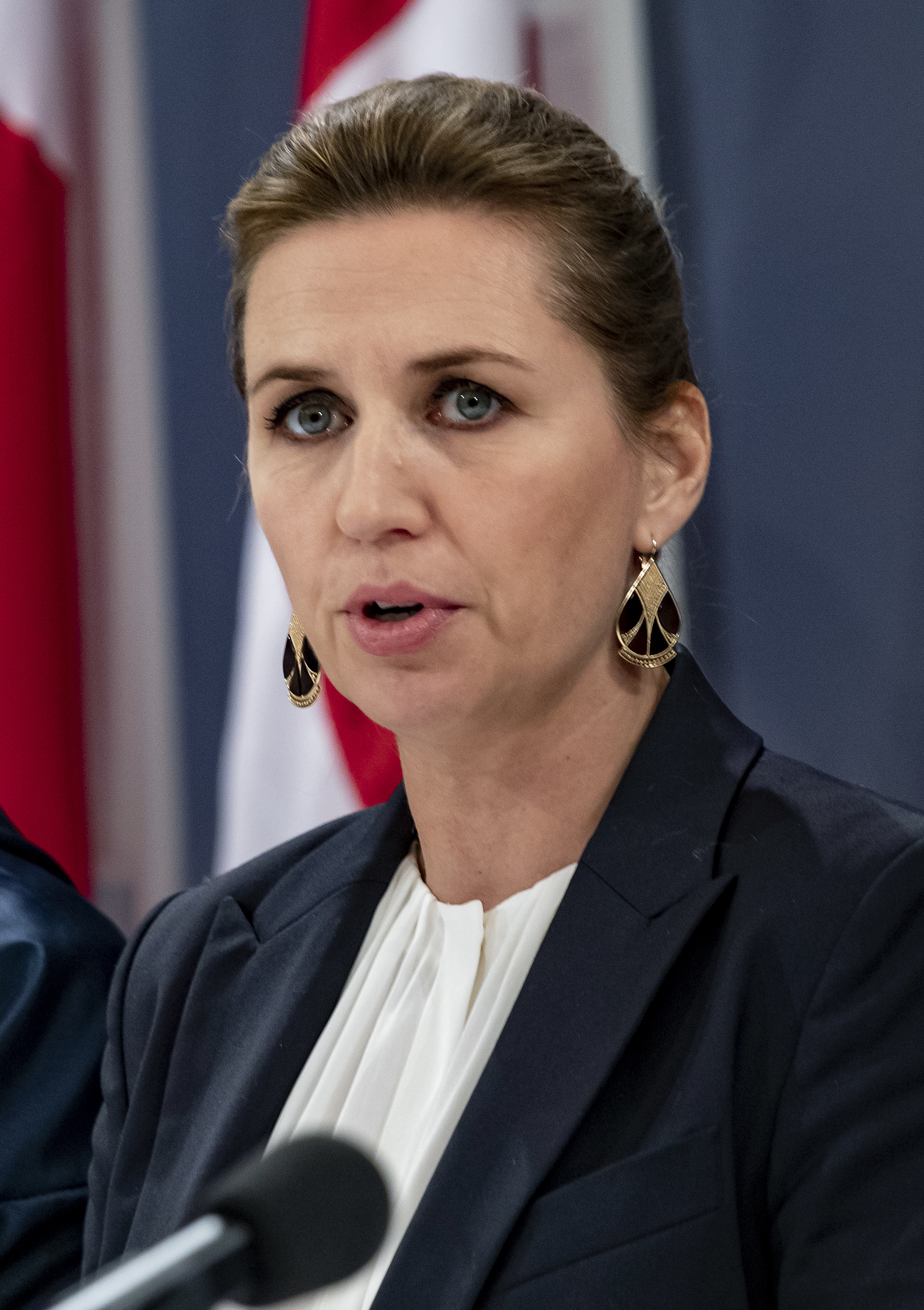
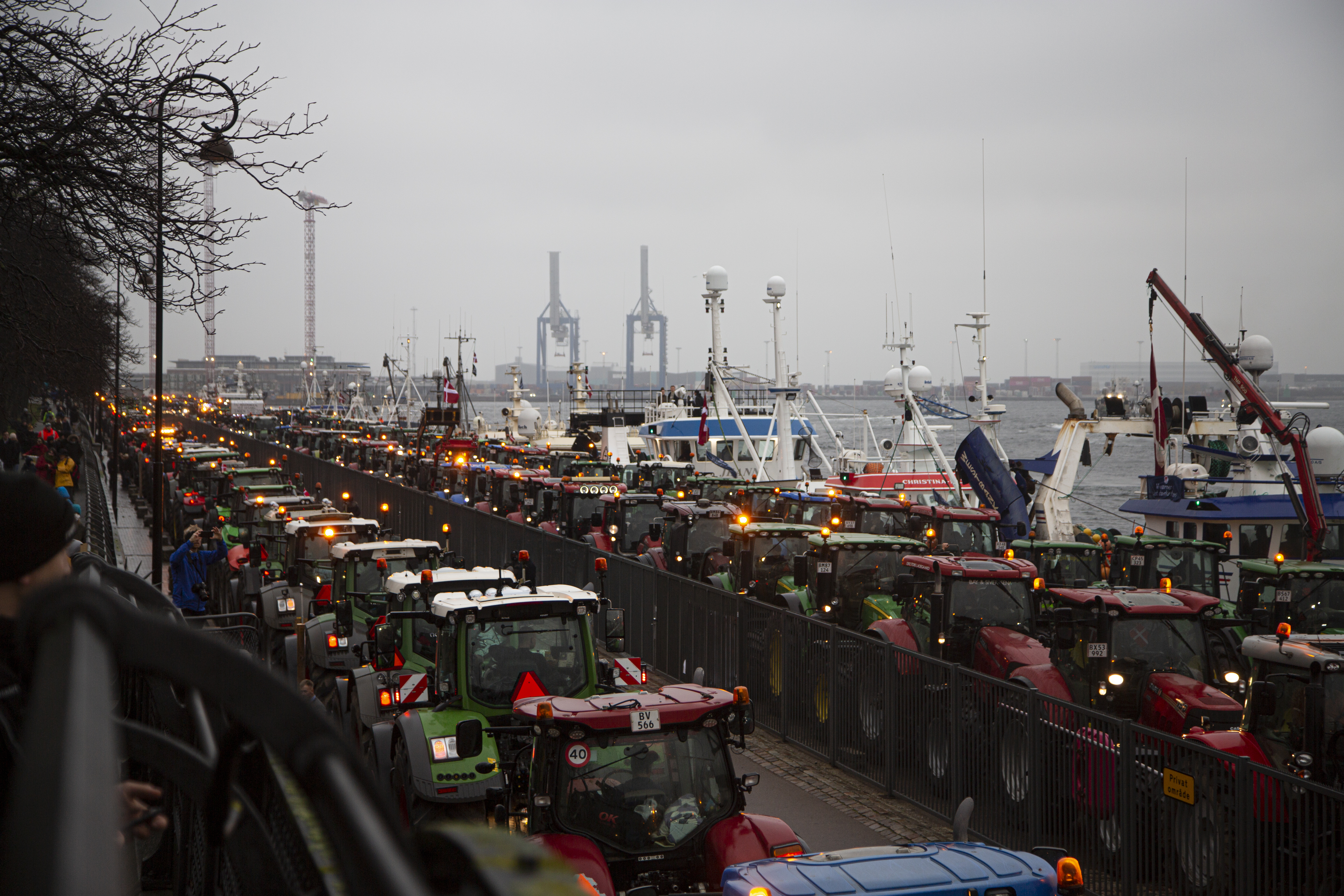
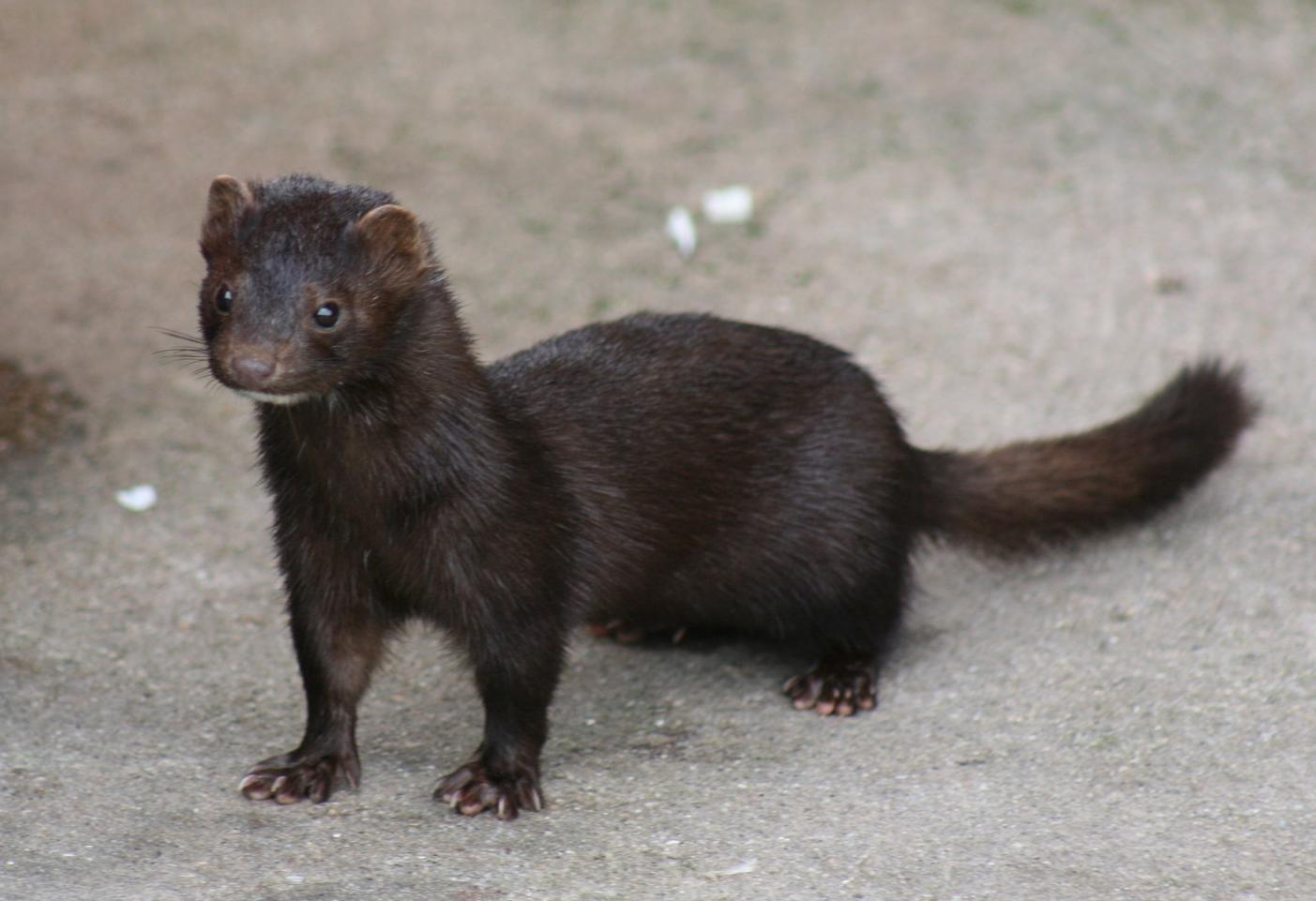
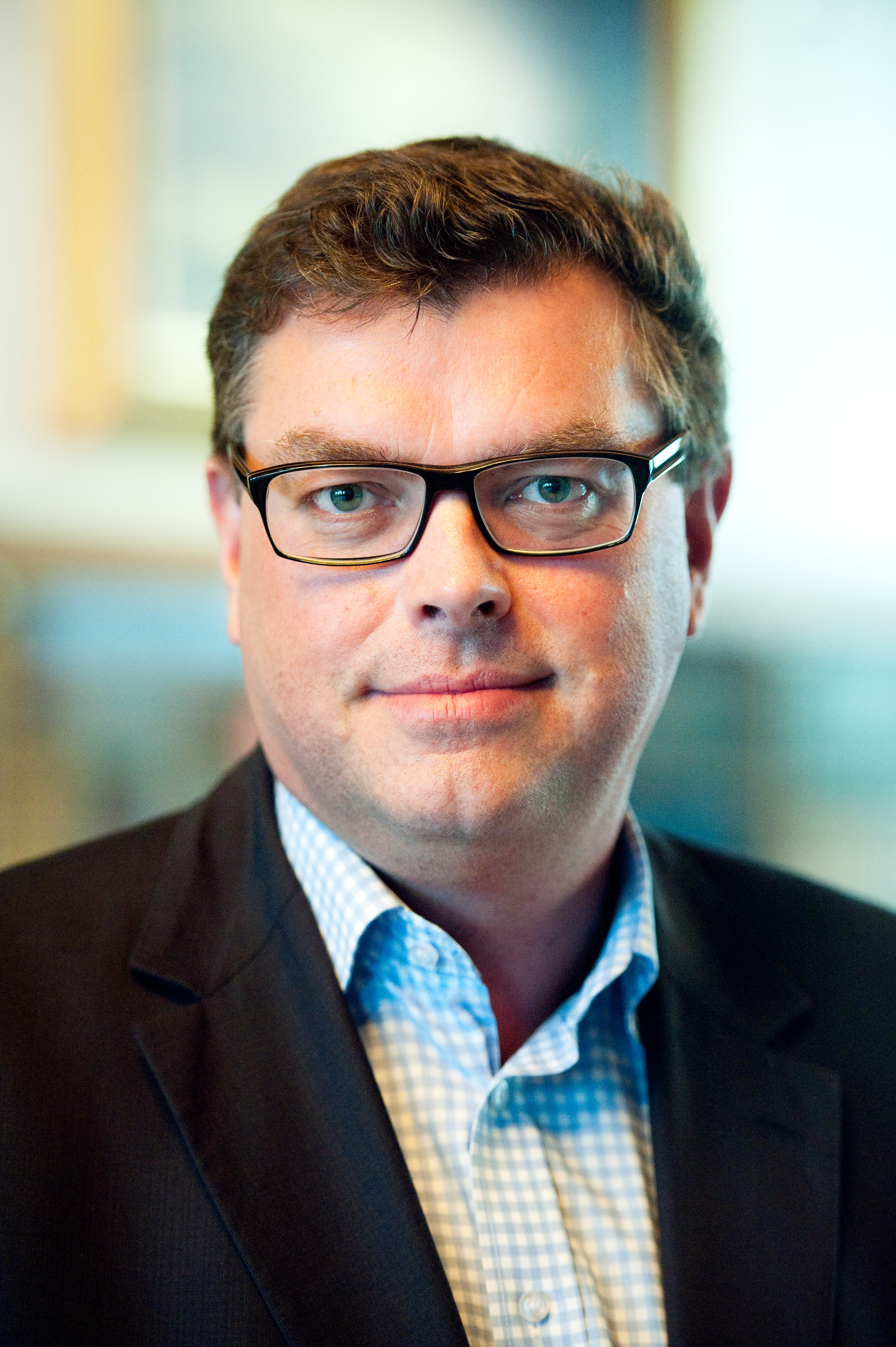
From top-left, clockwise: Danish prime minister Mette Frederiksen • Protesters in Langelinie, Copenhagen • Minister of food Mogens Jensen • A mink (Neogale vison)

The 2020 Danish mink cull was the government-mandated culling of all roughly 17 million mink that were being raised on farms for their fur in Denmark. The cull started in September in response to the detection of Cluster 5, an outbreak of a novel variant of SARS-CoV-2, in the mink during the COVID-19 pandemic in Denmark. The cluster led to concerns that the potential of spillover to humans could reduce the efficacy of COVID-19 vaccines. The cull was made nation-wide on 4 November 2020; however, two days later the government announced that the extension of the cull orders had been given without legal authority, causing a political scandal, also known as the "Mink Case" (Danish: Minksagen). Around 150,000 mink were culled without authority before the problem was identified.

After the legal issues were discovered, the government put forward a bill which, with its adoption on 21 December 2020, established legal authority behind the national culling order. In the meantime, the authorities continued to recommend farmers to continue culling all mink on a voluntary basis. A large number of mink carcasses were buried in mass graves, but were later exhumed and disposed of by incineration, because the buried carcasses posed a danger of polluting the local groundwater. A general ban on mink breeding was established in 2021 and later extended until 31 December 2022.

The actions of several high-profile officials were criticised in the ensuing investigation known as the Mink Commission. The criticism of the majority of the officials was later revoked, however, following a more particular legal inquiry. The political reactions to the handling of the culling caused the resignation of the Minister of Food Mogens Jensen in November 2020 and eventually led to snap general elections in 2022, which resulted in a strengthening of the ruling Social Democratic party. As of 2022, the culling is estimated to have caused kr. 20 billion (US$3 billion) in financial damages. Payment of financial compensation to the mink breeders was originally planned to be paid no later than 2024, but according to later assessments may in some cases be delayed until 2027.

== Background ==
=== Mink industry before the culls ===
In 2019, there were almost 800 Danish mink farms with a total of almost 3,000 people employed. At that time, the industry was in decline with falling turnover, with fewer employed and fewer farms than five years earlier, while the individual herds had a deficit of DKK 700,000 per farm on average. The Danish mink industry produced 40% of the world's pelts and was the largest producer of mink skins in the world. The actual production value of the Danish mink industry amounted according to Statistics Denmark in 2019 to DKK 2.5 billion. According to the Danish Agriculture & Food Council (Landbrug & Fødevarer), mink fur and skins ranked the third largest agricultural export product of animal origin, with an annual export value of €1.1 billion. According to the DR, Denmark exported 24.5 million mink pelts with a total value of 4.9 billion. kr. in 2019.

=== Beginning of the COVID-19 pandemic ===
The COVID-19 pandemic, caused by severe acute respiratory syndrome coronavirus 2 (SARS-CoV-2), began with an outbreak of COVID-19 in Wuhan, China, in December 2019. It spread to other areas of Asia, and then worldwide in early 2020. The World Health Organisation (WHO) declared the outbreak a public health emergency of international concern (PHEIC) on 30 January 2020, and assessed the outbreak as having become a pandemic on 11 March. On that day, Frederiksen held a press briefing in which she with the opening words "What I want to say tonight is going to have major consequences for all Danes".

=== First SARS-CoV-2 infections in mink ===
Minks are among the animals that can be infected with coronaviruses. This became a topic of concern during the COVID-19 pandemic, over fears of viral evolution in mink and spillover back into humans, which could impact the efficacy of vaccines that were being developed. Transmission of the SARS-CoV-2 virus from minks to humans was first documented in the Netherlands through genetic tracing, which prompted the Dutch government to bring forward a slated ban on mink farming to March 2021 from 2024. The United States Department of Agriculture confirmed that cases of minks infected with COVID-19 had been documented in Utah in August 2020. On 15 June 2020 the Veterinary and Food Agency (Fødevarestyrelsen) documented COVID-19 in a mink herd in the northernmost part of North Jutland called Vendsyssel. It was not possible at this point to determine whether the mink had infected humans or vice versa. The disease had also reached several residents of the nursing home Vendelbocenteret in Sindal. The lack of hospitalisations from this source of infection could, according to the SSI, indicate a relatively mild variant.

Authorities decided to cull the minks on these farms to prevent further infection spread. In a September risk assessment, the SSI described the spread of "a special mink variant" in North Jutland. This SARS-CoV-2 variant was later named Cluster 5 by the SSI. In September, the spread increased, and the health and veterinary authorities expressed concern. On 1 October, COVID-19 was detected among 41 herds in North Jutland, and infection was suspected in a further 20. The government therefore announced that all mink within a radius of 7.8 kilometers from an infected farm must be culled and the owners compensated. There was already a legal basis for such locally limited measures. The decision resulted in approximately 100 North Jutlandic farms having to cull their herds.

=== Risk assessment ===
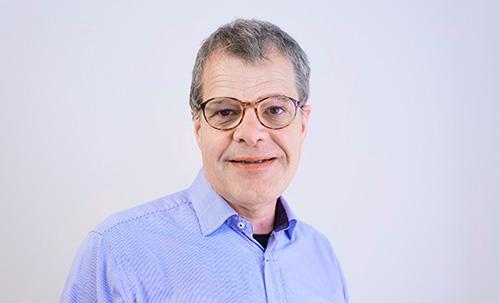
Kåre Mølbak, director of the SSI from 2017 to 2021, was the sender of the risk assessment that led to the mass cullings

On 13 October, chief physician Anders Fomsgaard from SSI reported that the mutated coronavirus cluster 5, which was found in Danish mink, could potentially reduce the efficacy of COVID-19 vaccines. On 2 November, Kåre Mølbak, Executive President of the SSI, stated that in a worst-case scenario Denmark risked potentially becoming "a new Wuhan". This assessment was new for the Ministry of Health and the Ministry of the Environment and Food, who requested a new risk assessment from SSI and called the government's Coordination Committee to a meeting on 3 November. In the SSI's new risk assessment from 3 November 2020, it was concluded that continued mink breeding would lead to a significant probability of further spread of COVID-19. This could threaten public health both because the many infected mink farms could lead to a greater disease burden among humans, and because a large virus reservoir in mink would increase the risk of new virus mutations arising again, potentially reducing optimal vaccine protection. The institute concluded, "Continued mink breeding during an ongoing COVID-19 epidemic poses a significant risk to public health, including to the possibilities of preventing covid-19 with vaccines".

== Decision to cull all mink ==
=== Coordination committee meeting (3 November) ===
On the evening of 3 November, a meeting took place in the cabinet's coordination committee (koordinationsudvalget). In addition to the prime minister, several other central ministers and officials also participated in the meeting, (Note: Among ministers participated Minister for Finance Nicolai Wammen, Minister for Foreign Affairs Jeppe Kofod, Minister for Taxation Morten Bødskov. Minister of Justice Nick Hækkerup was absent due to illness. Among officials participated Head of Department in the Ministry of Food Henrik Studsgaard, Head of Department in the Ministry of Justice Johan Legarth, and Head of Department in the Ministry of the State Barbara Bertelsen.) which was held virtually due to the current gathering restrictions during the pandemic. The meeting was held without summary, but the process was later unveiled during the Mink Commission's hearings. The Ministry of Justice had prepared a case for presentation at the meeting, which contained contributions from the various ministries and ended up recommending two courses of action: either a hibernation scheme for mink breeding or a permanent ban on mink breeding in Denmark.

The case's cover (summary of the case, which is usually the decision-making basis for ministers) mentioned the two alternatives and a proposal for a speed bonus. However, the cover did not contain any information about possible issues regarding legal authority for the culls nor grant legal basis (bevillingsmæssig hjemmel) for a speed bonus, and the issues in this regard were not mentioned at the meeting. In two appendices which accompanied the cover, however, the legal challenges did feature. Yet, the full case with all the annexes did not reach the ministers and the other officials until six minutes before the meeting. None of the meeting participants had therefore had the opportunity to read the appendices, just as none of the present officials had drawn attention to legal issues.

In her testimony to the Mink Commission, Frederiksen explained that she as leader of the meeting had decided not to postpone or interrupt the meeting for a reading break on account of her clear conviction being a need for urgent action, and that she had had trust in that the ministers would point out the topics that the committee should be aware of. At the 44-minute long meeting, it was decided to cull all mink in Denmark, including the breeding animals. As chairman of the committee, Frederiksen had the ultimate responsibility for this decision.

=== Announcement and execution of the orders ===
Number of mink culled between 4–16 November 2020 as per April 2021
| Zone and definition | Amount |
|---|---|
| Zone 1: infected mink | 3,457,592 |
| Zone 2: mink within 7.8 km of an infected farm | 4,187,946 |
| Zone 3: mink neither infected nor within 7.8 km of an infected farm | 3,293,753 |
| Total | 10,939,291 |

The day after, the Ministry of the State summoned a press conference for later that day. There, Frederiksen stated the cabinet's decision: "Firstly, it is necessary to cull all mink in Denmark. Unfortunately, this also applies to breeding animals" and further stated that, "With the corona mutations, which we are now seeing in North Jutland, we can risk that the efficacy of the future vaccine will be weakened or, in the worst case, absent". Kåre Mølbak stated at the same event that it was important to understand that "worst case is that we have a pandemic that starts all over again, with starting point in Denmark". In the following days, the culling of mink was therefore strongly intensified. Denmark was divided into three zones, where zone 1 was infected herds, zone 2 herds within a radius of 7.8 kilometers from an infected herd and zone 3 farms outside this radius. The authorities (the police, the Danish Veterinary and Food Administration, the armed forces and the Home Guard) assisted the culling of mink in zones 1 and 2, where there was legal basis to order culling. The farmers were offered a "speed bonus" if they culled their mink quickly. During the culling process the borders between the zones could change, e.g. in the event of an outbreak in a given farm or one nearby. On 6 November, cullings also began in zone 3, for which there was no legal authority. It was this lack of legal authority in zone 3 that was the starting point for the legal case.

In the period from 10 October to 30 November, approx. 15.5 million mink were culled distributed on 1182 herds throughout Denmark. Of this, 351 mink herds were in zone 1 and 512 in zone 2, corresponding to respectively 4.9 and 6.5 million killed mink. In zone 3, from 6 to 30 November, 319 herds corresponding to four million animals were culled. Of this, almost 150,000 animals were culled in the days from 6 to 10 November on which date the mink breeders in zone 3 were informed that it was only a recommendation and not an order from the authorities for the animals to be culled.

On the evening of 5 November, Kopenhagen Fur approached the Veterinary and Food Administration and requested clearer communication to the mink breeders, who felt frustrated and confused. Upon request from Kopenhagen Fur and the Ministry of the Environment and Food, the agency sent a proposal for a letter to all mink breeders to the ministry's Head of department. The letter concerned both mink in and outside the infection zones. The ministry sent some proposals for corrections back to the agency, and the agency corrected them in the letter. The same afternoon, the ministry sent an email to the agency stating that the agency "have to initiate the culls before the numbers are up. Both on infected and non-infected herds", and that it should be "evident from the letter to the mink breeders that they just have to start". The Veterinary and Food Agency sent the letter to the mink breeders via Kopenhagen Fur. The letter stated, "The government has announced that all mink in the country must be culled for reasons of public health. It is important that the culls take place as soon as possible". To the mink breeders outside the infection zones, appeared, "The culling of all mink (including breeding animals) must be over by 16 November 2020. You must therefore start culling and furring the herd the soonest possible".

== Health-related assessments ==
=== Danish experts ===
After the press conference on 4 November, a discussion arose among professionals about the health-related basis for the decision. Particular criticism was raised concerning the supposed risk from the cluster 5 variant, which had been emphasised as central at the press conference. Numerous experts doubted cluster 5 in itself posing a significant threat. During the Mink Commission's hearings a year later, it became known that the Director General of the Danish Health Authority, Søren Brostrøm, had warned the SSI and the Ministry of Health's Head of Department Per Okkels as soon as 3 November 2020 against letting the concerns for cluster 5 be at the root of a new risk assessment. On 6 November 2020, researchers from the University of Copenhagen issued a memo to the SSI, doubting the SSI's data in itself being an indication of a serious vaccine threat. On 9 November, the Danish Medicines Agency similarly stated in a memo that the cluster 5 mutation did not pose a significant threat to the efficacy of first-generation vaccines.

The SSI itself also subsequently downplayed the importance of cluster 5. Kåre Mølbak thus stated on 9 November that the SSI's biggest concern since June had been the large reservoir of virus constituted by mink, and that the cluster 5 variant was not worrying in itself. He agreed that the issues surrounding cluster 5 itself had been granted too much weight, and that it would not surprise him if the cluster 5 variant had already gone extinct, but also stated that a large mink population would pose a risk for future variants who potentially could cause reduced vaccine efficacy.

His colleague, then head of department in the SSI, Tyra Grove Krause, mentioned a few days later that a study with cluster 5, which Minister of Health Magnus Heunicke had highlighted at the press conference on 4 November, did not document cluster 5 in itself to pose a threat against a future vaccine. At the same time, she clarified that the SSI's risk assessment was not based on the specific cluster 5 study, but that the description of the study was simply included in the assessment as one data point on top of everything else that made up the risk assessment.

Professor of immunology Jens Christian Jensenius wrote in October 2021 that there did not seem to be "doubt... that the Executive President of Statens Serum Institut professor Kåre Mølbak led the government astray leading up to the press conference on 4 November 2020", and that the results of Anders Fomsgaard's preliminary studies had been misused by Kåre Mølbak to foster the dramatic decision on 4 November, which was thus not made on grounds of evidence. Jensenius stated that there was widespread agreement among professionals that mink farming on the large scale as practiced in Denmark could be a hotbed for new pandemics, but that the panicked culling, based on an alleged immediate danger associated with cluster 5, was not well founded.

In his book titled Vild virus (Wild Virus) from October 2022, professor of infectious diseases Jens Lundgren, referring to the role of the cluster 5 mutations, said that Kåre Mølbak's risk assessment was "overdone", "painted too dark of a picture", and relied on a thin scientific foundation. Lundgren furthermore explained in connection with the book's publication that he believed that the government could not be blamed for acting on the basis of the SSI risk assessment, which in his opinion could not be ignored when it was formulated as it was. The SSI repeated in a response to Lundgren's criticism that the institute had not relied solely on concern with respect to the cluster 5 mutations, but also on the rapid increase in infections in mink, the prevalent transmission of viruses from mink to humans, where 4,000 people in Jutland at the time in question were estimated to have been infected with the variant, and the concern regarding development of resistance in vaccines among certain viruses.

=== Foreign experts ===
On 10 November 2020, World Health Organisation epidemiologist Margaret Harris stated that "We consider the global risk associated with the new mink-related variant to be very low. Definitely". The next day, Anthony Fauci, at the time lead member of the White House Coronavirus Task Force in the United States, explained that he too found no reason to believe the mink infection to threaten a future vaccine.

== Lack of legal basis ==
=== Disclosure of lacking legal basis ===
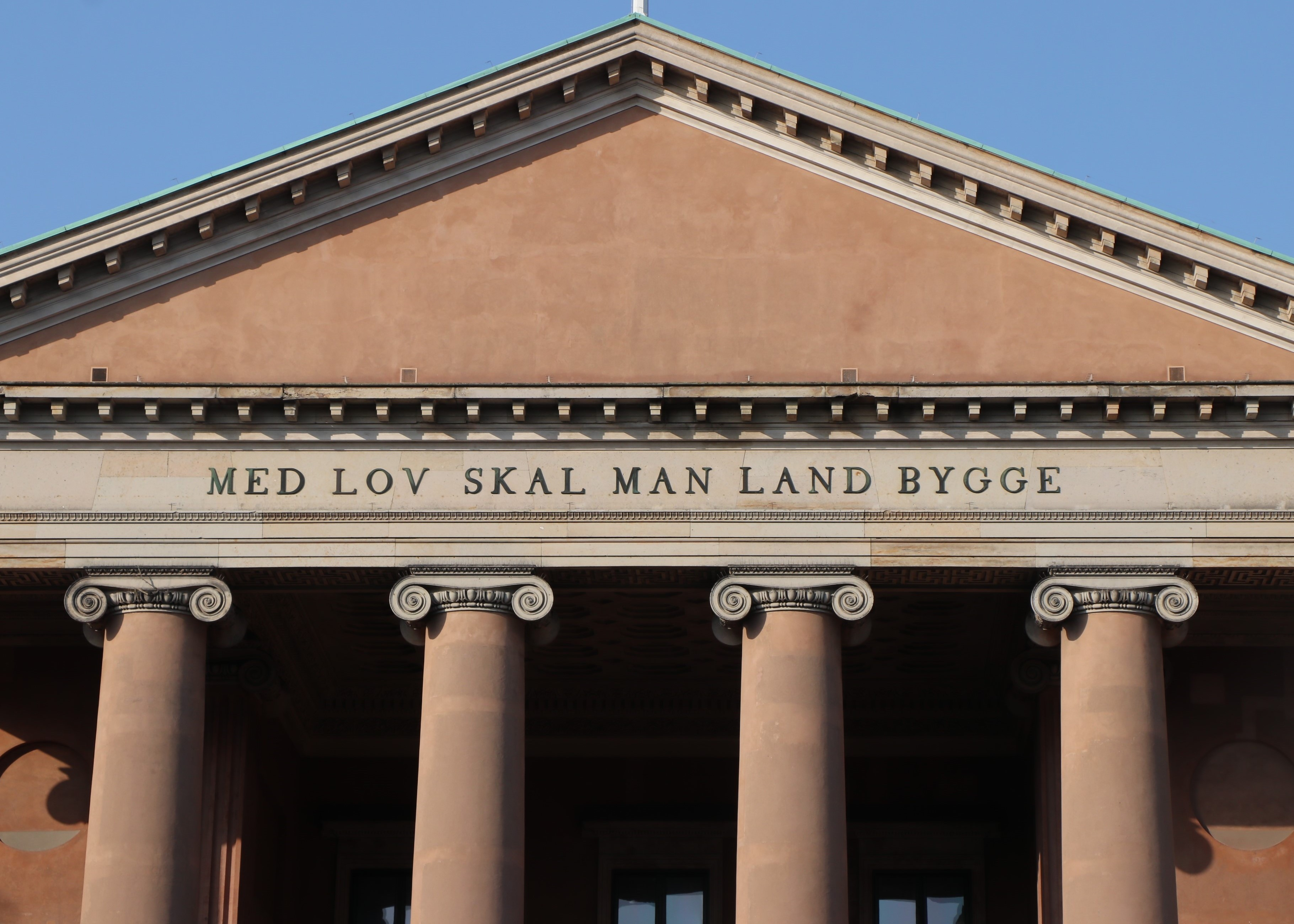
A central Danish legal principle is that all decisions must be grounded in law. Here a paraphrasing of the introduction to the Code of Jutland as an inscription above Copenhagen Court House. Meaning: With law shall land be built

As mentioned, it was already stated in two appendices to the cover at the government's coordination committee meeting on 3 November that there was a legal problem in relation to the two proposed cull models, but the participants had not had the opportunity to read the appendices, and the problem had not been addressed at the meeting of the officials who had participated in the preparation of the case files. In the civil service, however, the discussion about possible legal problems continued in the following days. Shortly before the government's press conference on 4 November, where the decision to cull was proclaimed, the Veterinary and Food Agency warned against legal obstacles. The agency contacted the Ministry of Food and asked for a contact in the Ministry of Justice because the agency did not find it to be judicially justified to cull all the nation's mink, which "the Ministry of Environment and Food can endorse". The following day the Ministry of Justice communicated that it "does not have reason to override" the assessment. There was agreement about the need for new legislation to cull mink outside the zones.

According to the Mink Commission's later conclusions the Minister of Food was given notice about the issues with legal basis on 5 November, while Frederiksen was informed on 8 November. Mogens Jensen notified Parliament and the press about the government having neither legal basis for the ongoing culling of all mink nor the speed bonuses. On 10 November the Veterinary and Food Agency sent a letter to the mink breeders explicitly stating that it was only an "instigation" to cull all mink outside the zones as well as a pledge to secure the necessary legal justification for demanding all mink culled. To Ekstra Bladet on 8 November the Minister of Food gave a statement that due to the urgency of the situation he had assessed that one "couldn't have awaited new legislation before delivering an announcement". The day after he apologised the "unclear communication" on whether there had been the proper legislation in place to justify ordering mink outside the security zones culled. On 10 November Jensen explained that he had not been aware of the lack of legal basis for giving the order when the government announced it on the press conference and called it "a mistake".

After 8 November disagreement emerged among judicial scholars on whether the orders had indeed been lacking legal basis. However, in its report the Mink Commission concluded that the orders had been "grossly misleading and blatantly illegal".

=== Jensen resignation ===
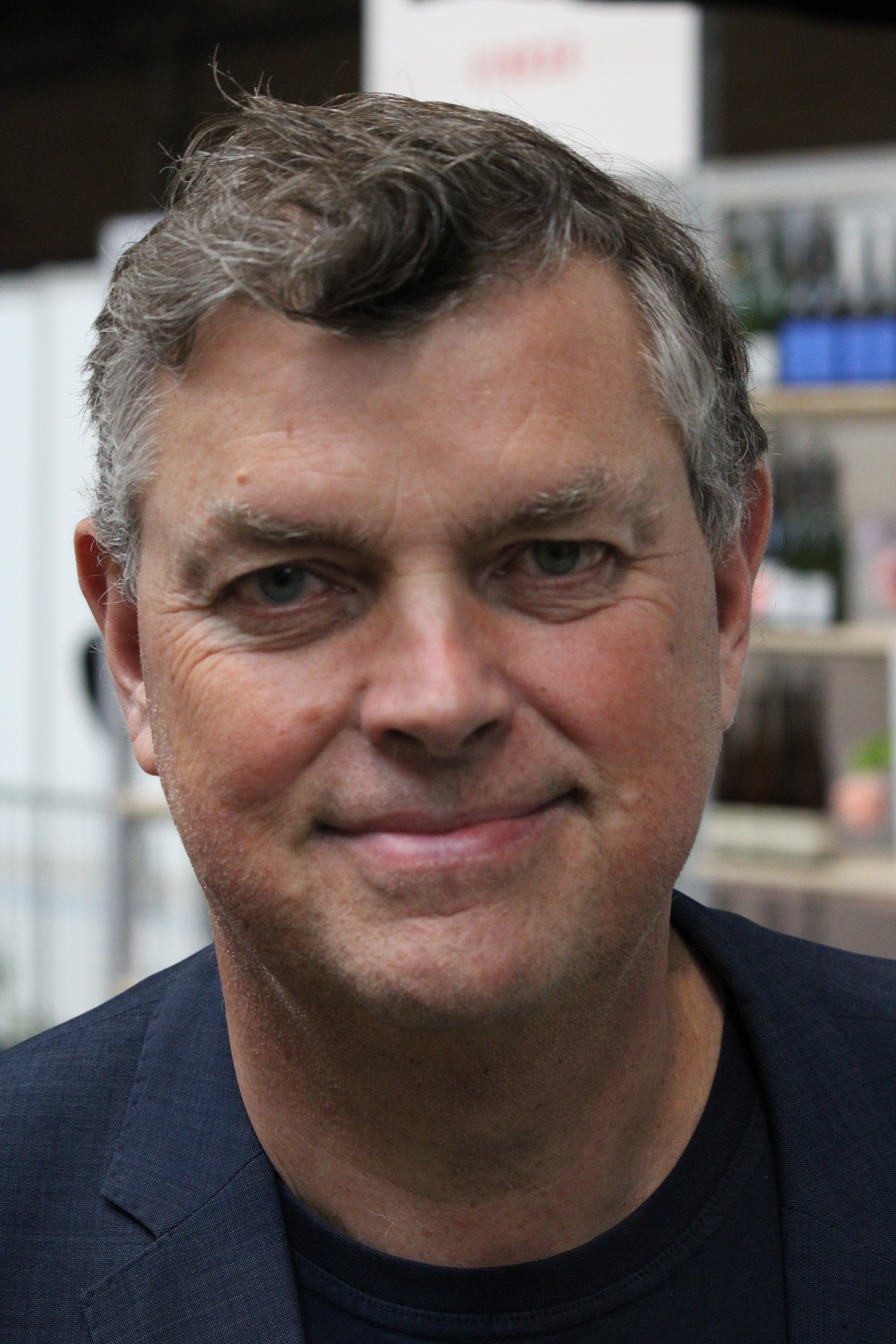
Minister of food of Mogens Jensen who resigned from office after having misinformed the Folketing and the public

After the information about the lack of legal authority had been published, Jensen was sharply criticised by the government's external support parties Radikale Venstre and Enhedslisten. The criticism focused both on his responsibility for the culling decision without having secured legal authority and on the fact that he had reacted too little and too late to mitigate the risk of coronavirus mutations among mink. After Jensen had been in consultation on 17 November 2022, and the Ministry of Food issuing a report the following day on the process, both the two parties and the government's third external support party, Socialistisk Folkeparti, expressed on 18 November that they no longer had confidence in Jensen as Minister of Food, and he tendered his declaration of resignation the same day.

In connection with the minister change, it was announced the following day that the Ministry of Environment and Food would once again be split into the Ministry of Environment and the Ministry of Food, Agriculture and Fisheries. Lea Wermelin was appointed new minister in the first ministry and Rasmus Prehn in the latter. Jensen continued as deputy chairman of Socialdemokratiet.

=== L 77 ===
On 10 November, before his exit Jensen had put forward a bill (lovforslag) which would provide the legal justification to cull all mink and prohibit mink breeding. The bill named L 77 also legal authority for the payments of speed bonuses to mink breeders who contributed to the culling of their animals. After a settlement between the government and its three external support parties as well as Alternativet on 16 November, the bill was passed on 21 December ensuring the law basis behind the decisions. The law only applied for Denmark proper and not Greenland and the Faroe Islands.

In a draft of the bill from the government, it appeared that the recommendation of the SSI was to cull all mink in Denmark. The SSI rejected this and emphasised it being a political decision. Apart from the passing of L 77 the Mink Commission was also created as a consequence of the case. The government initially tried to get the processing of the bill expedited (hastebehandling), which required a three-quarters majority in the Folketing. The government abandoned this before the bill was put before Parliament (fremsættelse). The law contained an exception which allowed zoos and animal parks to keep up to five minks.

== Police involvement ==
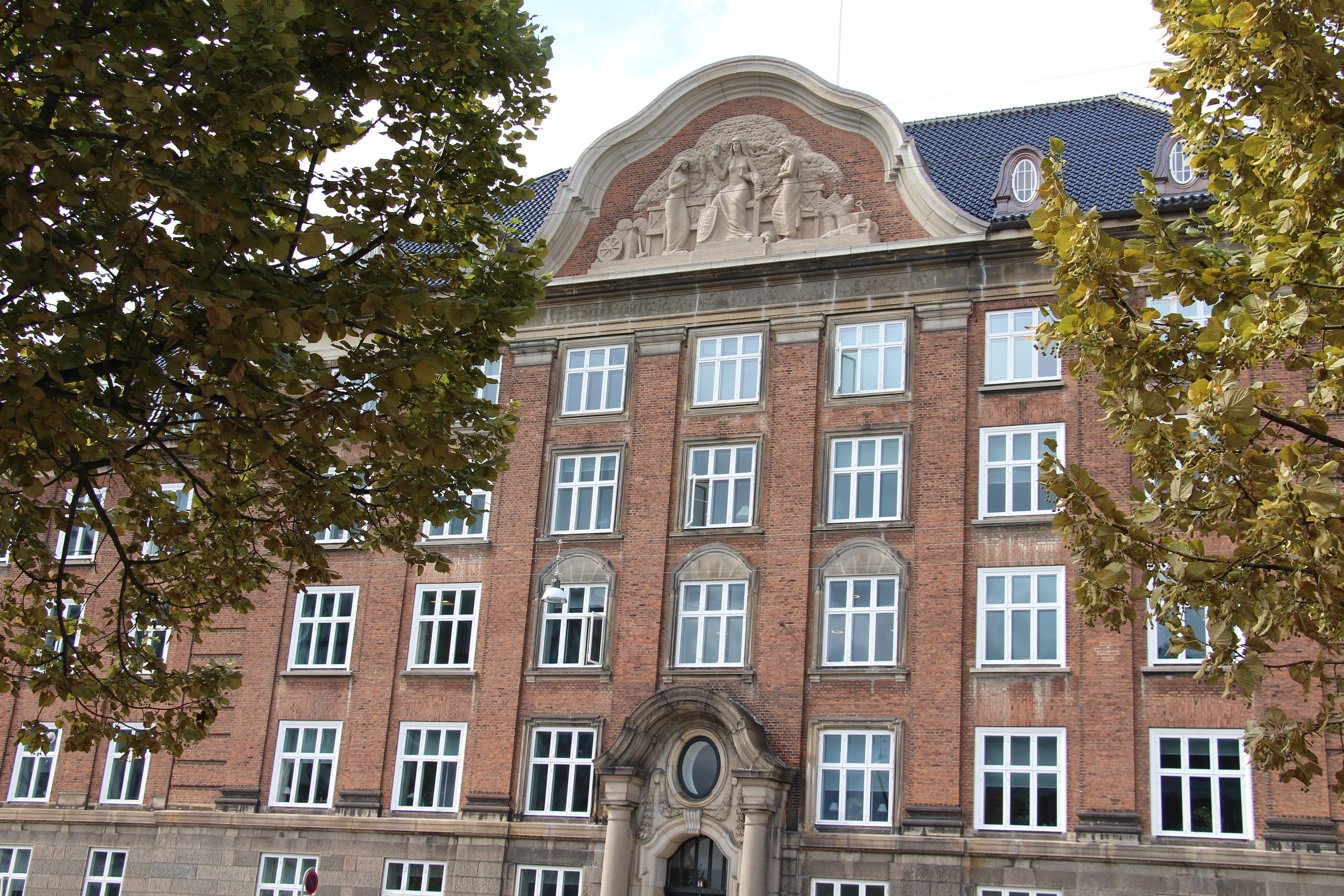
Headquarter of the Rigspoliti on Vesterbro, Copenhagen

=== Role of the Police ===
At the press conference on 4 November 2020, Frederiksen stated that in order to support the food authorities' ongoing cull efforts, "an emergency plan for euthanasia is now being implemented, which is handled under the auspices of the National Operative Staff (Den Nationale Operative Stab) under the command of the police". A sub-staff called Operations Staff Mink (Operationsstab Mink) was established.

After the press conference, mink breeders outside the infection zones received phone calls from the National Police of Denmark (Rigspolitiet). To support the conversations with the breeders, the cadets were given a so-called action card, which functioned as a script. The text recommended the breeders to participate in the cull of their herds, and one of the questions was whether they were willing to do so. If they agreed the conversation would be over. If they refused, the police officials were instrued in saying:

"I'm sorry to hear that, but the decision has been made. Failure to cooperate will therefore mean that you don't get to obtain the bonus, and you can expect that the authorities to come and perform the emptying of the herds anyway. I would therefore like to know, whether this makes you change your mind?"

=== Criticism of the Rigspolitiet ===
Rigspolitiet and the Police Commissioner Thorkild Fogde was criticised for the executions of the calls after the publication of the Ministry of Environment and Food's review from 18 November 2020 concluding that Rigspolitiet knew about the illegality at the time of making of the action cards. Rigspolitiet itself admitted this afterwards.

=== Lawyer investigation of Rigspolitiet's action card ===
In the spring of 2021 the Folketing initiated a lawyer investigation of the police action card. The report on the investigation was published on 8 October and was made by Claus Guldager. The investigation concluded that, in relation to the action cards, negligence had been committed, but a further evaluation of i t could not be performed within the assigned terms of the investigation. In addition, the investigation concluded, "There is no basis for assuming that people in the top management of the police – or in the management levels below – have instructed anyone to prepare an action card".

In the investigation's review of the actual sequence of events, there were comments on the question of whether it was true and fair when the Ministry of Environment and Food in its review of 18 November wrote, "It has not been established in the available material that the question of legal justification to extend the previous efforts to cull mink to the whole country has been mentioned in cases for use in discussions in the relevant government committees in the period from 1 October 2020 until 3 November 2020". The investigation pointed out that the cover (main memo) to the government's coordinations committee meeting on 3 November noted that "[t]he emergency plan is assessed to require deviations from a number of current rules and guidelines in the environmental and animal fields".

Based on the investigation, on 19 November 2021, the Folketing expanded the Mink Commission's terms of reference to also include an investigation of Rigspolitiet's action card.

== Burial and re-excavation of the culled mink ==
Location of Nørre Felding and Kølvrå, near where millions of dead minks were buried and later re-excavated

From 5 to 19 November, 13.5 million mink were culled in Denmark, of which approx. 3 million were buried in mass graves. According to the Ministry of Food, the burial of mink was deemed necessary due to the "tempo of the cullings". As the animal carcasses started decomposing, gases caused them to expand and push them out of the ground while also risking contaminating drinking water.

On 2 December, Food Minister Rasmus Prehn and Environment Minister Lea Wermelin were by Parliament summoned to a consultation (samråd) on the matter. On 21 December 2020, it was decided that the minks were to be re-excavated. In May 2021 and two months ahead, the exhumation of nearly four million dead mink began at military facilities near Holstebro and Karup. The re-excavation was estimated in advance to cost 80 million kr. However, the Ministry of Food and Agriculture requested that 150 million kr. be made available. The re-excavated mink were taken to 13 different incineration plants around Denmark. Food Minister Rasmus Prehn called it in May 2021 a "troublesome and regrettable" case, but added that he had no need to point fingers at the people who made the decision, which was taken to protect public health.

According to Peter Pagh, professor of environmental law at the University of Copenhagen, there was a lack of legal authority to deposit the dead mink in the mass graves. However, in its memo of 15 December 2020, the Ministry of Food denied having broken the law. The process received criticism from both ends of the Folketinget by, among others, Rasmus Jarlov (K), who called the burial of mink a "tragic story taken on a thin and hasty basis".

=== Lawyer investigation of the burial of culled mink ===
In April 2021, the Danish Parliament launched a lawyer investigation into the burial of culled mink. The report on the investigation was published on 8 October 2021. In the investigation, it was concluded about errors and omissions, "that it will not be possible on the present basis to attribute the errors committed to individual persons, or that any errors by the individual person will have nature of a misconduct".

== Mink Commission ==
The Folketing decided on 11 November 2020, that an impartial investigation of the 2020 Danish mink cull would take place. A political majority agreed on 10 December to the establishment of a new form of commission called an inquiry commissionsamråd (granskningskommission) and having the case investigated by one such. On 23 April 2021 the Folketing sat up the Mink Commission.

=== Terms of reference ===
According to the Terms of reference of a commission of inquiry into the case of the culling of mink (Kommissorium for en granskningskommission om sagen om aflivning af mink), the commission had the task of:

"...investigate and account for the overall course of events and for the actions and involvement of all relevant authorities and ministers in the decision and execution of the decision that all mink in Denmark as part of the efforts to combat covid-19 immediately had to be culled".

The Commission focused in particular on the 14 days leading up to the press conference, where the decision was announced to the public, as well as how ministers and other relevant people reacted when they became aware of problems with a lack of legal authority. Furthermore, an independent assessment must be made of whether there was legal authority to make the decision and whether anyone can be held legally responsible for the process. The terms of reference were in November expanded to also comprehend an investigation of the Rigspoliti's action card. However, the responsibilities of any ministers were not to be assessed. The health or veterinary basis for making the decision itself was not part of the commission's assessment.

he members of the commission were national judge Michael Kistrup (chairman), professor Helle Krunke from the University of Copenhagen and lawyer Ole Spiermann from the law firm Bruun & Hjejle, while lawyer Jakob Lund Poulsen was the commission's interrogator (udspørger).

=== Hearings ===
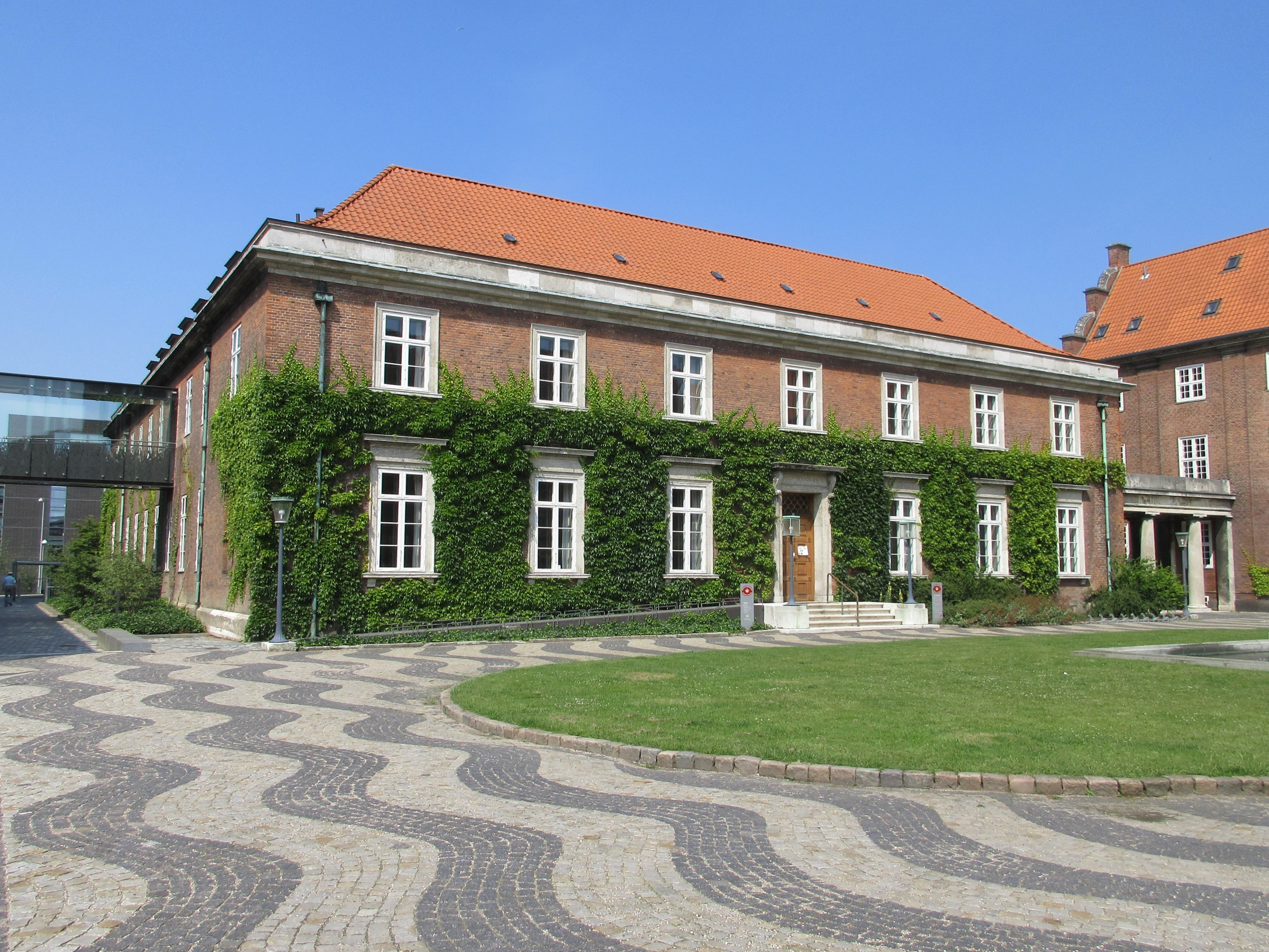
The commission's hearings took place at the Court in Frederiksberg from October 2021 to April 2022

Several officials expressed at the hearings, that they unambiguously had warned that there had not been the legal authority to require all mink culled.

During the hearings four assessors (bisiddere), including the assessors for Frederiksen and her head of department, contested that there had lacked legal authority to cull all mink. In relation to this, Professor Andreas B. Ehlers noted in a memo, "that such an authority cannot be read from the preparatory work (forarbejderne) and the legal history of Section 30 of the Animal Husbandry Act (husdyrholdloven) as stated by the assessors".

On 13 November two officials testified to the commission, that Ministry of Food had indicated that "a total slaughter, including all breeding animals, is considered to be fatal for the industry". Allegedly, this assessment was supported by the Ministry of Justice and sent "up the system". Head of department in the Ministry of State Barbara Bertelsen explained at the hearing on 18 November that she had not been made aware of the problem with the lack of legal authority.

The testimony of Minister of Health Magnus Heunicke showed that the Minister of Health had taken handwritten notes from the meeting in the coordination committee, where the decision had been made. He explained, among other things, that the head of department in the Ministry of Justice, Johan Legarth, had initiated the meeting by claiming that SSI had indicated that all mink should be culled for reasons of public health. This memo was contradicted by the Prime Minister's Chief of Staff, Martin Justesen, who did not perceive that Legarth had made this statement, and he added that it would be highly unusual for an official to open such a meeting by presenting a conclusion.

Frederiksen emphasised during her testimony that no one at the meeting on 3 November 2020 had mentioned the lack of legal authority and that this was a mistake. However, she did not want to blame anyone because, in her view, mistakes would be made during crisis management.

In the Ministry of the Environment and Food's statement with respect to the lack of legal authority, the date when Jensen knew of the lack of legal authority was given as 7 November 2020. During the hearings, a number of documents were presented in which the date of this knowledge was said to be 5 or 6 November 2020, and in a submitted text message correspondence from the period, Jensen himself believed the date to be 5 November 2020. Regarding the process surrounding the preparation of the Ministry of the Environment and Food's report, a number of documents with information about this had been classified by the government with reference to "the consideration of securing the government's internal and political decision-making process".

During the hearings, a department councilor in the Ministry of State explained that on 7 November he had received an email from an office manager in his ministry that urgent legislation (hastelovgivning) was needed to secure the legal basis for mink culling, but that he did not inform Bertelsen about this. It was also stated that on the morning of 7 November the Prime Minister had asked Health Minister Magnus Heunicke to call a new press conference, which took place that afternoon. At the press conference, Heunicke said that the cullings should "go quickly" and "be over by 16 November".

=== Deleted text messages ===
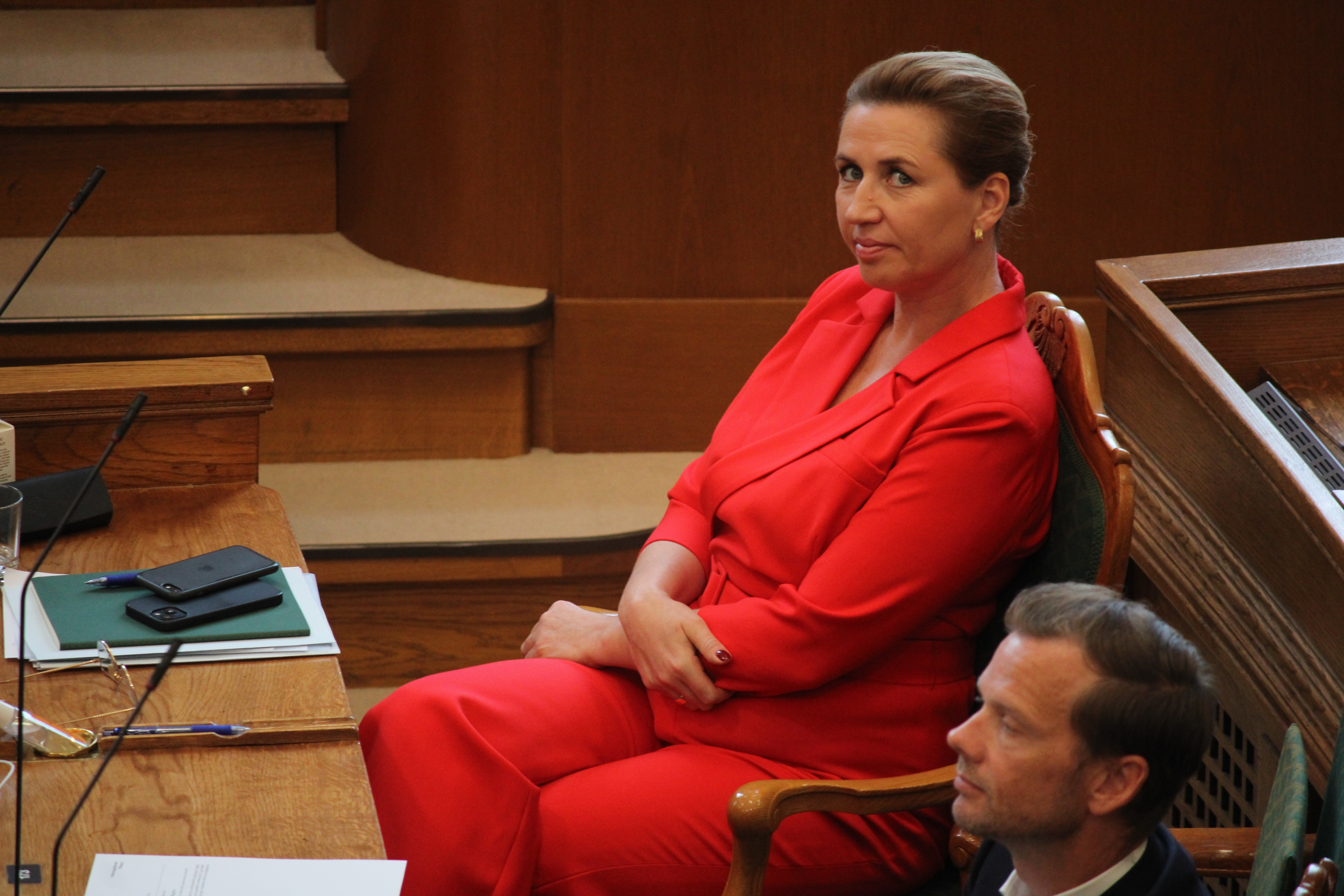
Mette Frederiksen at a hearing on the deleted messages in October 2025

In connection with the questioning of a number of officials, several text messages were presented, in which Bertelsen indicated that the matter could be "life-threatening" for the government and called for the Ministry of Food and the Ministry of Health to take responsibility. On 1 November 2021 it was revealed that Frederiksen and a number of advisers in the Ministry of the State had text messages automatically deleted after 30 days, and that a number of text messages exchanged during the mink process had therefore not been handed over to the Mink Commission, although this had already requested it on 29 April 2021.

At a press conference on 3 November 2021, Frederiksen stated that the deletion began at the latest during the summer of 2020 on the advice of Bertelsen, which the latter affirmed during a hearing on 18 November 2021. Asked on a harsh tone in some of the published text messages between officials in ministries and agencies, Frederiksen defended the officials, whose great work effort during the pandemic she praised. Continuing she added that Denmark would not have come through the pandemic so well without the country's officials, and continued "So yes, there may have been said stupid things and more than that. Live with it – live with it". (Note: Original Danish: "Så ja, der kan være røget en finke af panden og mere end det. Lev med det – lev med det". The first part directly translates to, "So yes, there may have fallen off a finch from the forehead. This is a Danish idiom meaning that someone has said something stupid or ill-conceived.) The phrase "Live with it" (Lev med det) became famous as an example of the Prime Minister's blunt style. Frederiksen later described the wording as a mistake during the election campaign for the 2022 general election and repeated that it was intended as an attempt to defend the people who were in the middle of crisis management.

Police authorities subsequently attempted to recover the text messages and announced to the public on 12 November that they had finished trying to recover them, but not the result. On the same day, the government received the results of the police's attempt in sealed envelopes. Monday 15 November at 9, a meeting was held between the Mink Commission, the Ministry of Justice, Frederiksen and the three top officials in the Ministry of State, (Note: Martin Justesen, Barbara Bertelsen, and Pelle Pape. Johan Kristian Legarth, its head of department, participated as representative of the Ministry of Justice.) who had switched on the automatic deletion of text messages after 30 days. On Wednesday 17 November, Frederiksen published the result of the police investigation, which was that it had not been possible to recreate the deleted text messages. The Prime Minister was criticised for delaying the announcement of the result until Wednesday, the day after the municipal and regional elections of 2021, when she had the option to announce it immediately after the meeting on Monday at 9. This among others by Jakob Ellemann (V), who called it "convenient". When asked why she waited to announce the result until Wednesday, the prime minister replied, "It's because I've been occupied with some other things, it almost goes without saying".

=== Report (beretning) ===
The commission submitted its report on 30 June 2022, in which it appeared that the decision to cull all Danish mink was without legal authority. The commission concluded about the prime minister's role:

"The Commission thus finds that Mette Frederiksen's announcements at the press conference on 4 November 2020 were objectively grossly misleading, but that Frederiksen subjectively did not have knowledge of this or intention to do so. The Commission has therefore not made an assessment of whether there is gross negligence".

The commission also concluded that Frederiksen must have been aware that the KU meeting was organised and material prepared in a forced process. Moreover, her announcements at the press conference on 4 November, where she ordered all mink dead, were "grossly misleading and clearly illegal".

Regarding the Ministry of State as a whole it "assumed an overarching and governing role in the forced process". Here the commission assessed, "Overall, it is the commission's assessment that the Ministry of State has acted in a very objectionable manner in the process, which led to the gross misleading of mink breeders and the public and the clearly illegal instructions to the authorities in connection with the press conference on 4 November 2020". Furthermore, the Ministry of Food and Agriculture had acted "particularly objectionable". Frederiksen declared during the 2022 election campaign that she disagreed that it had been a forced process.

Unequivocally, the Mink Commission rejected the then-Minister of Food's explanation that he only became aware of the lack of legal authority on 7 November at 06:31 PM. The commission wrote, "Mogens Jensen received information earlier, namely on 5 November 2020. The commission thus finds that Mogens Jensen, at least during the consultation on 11 November 2020, delivered incorrect information". Jensen had thus spoken untruthfully to the Folketing and the public, as he had said at a consultation on 11 November that he was only made aware of the lack of authorisation "at the weekend" (the period from 6 to 8 November 2020.)

At the same time, the commission found that 10 officials had committed "official misconduct of such severity that there was a basis for the public authorities to seek to hold them accountable".

== Consequences of the Mink Commission's report ==
=== Sanctioning of officials ===
The Mink Commission's report contained that 10 officials had committed "misconduct of such a seriousness that there are grounds for the public authorities to seek to hold them accountable". At the Prime Minister's press conference reacting to the Mink Commission's report on 1 July 2022, Frederiksen reported that the commission's assessments of officials would be reviewed primarily by the Danish Employee and Competence Agency (Medarbejder- og Kompetencestyrelsen). Based on the agency's review, Bertelsen, head of department in the Ministry of State, was issued a warning on 24 August. At the same time, Johan Legarth, head of department in the Ministry of Justice, was given a reprimand, while National Police Commissioner Thorkild Fogde and head of department in the Ministry of the Environment Henrik Studsgaard were relieved of duty and summoned to official interrogations.

The political independence of the Employee and Competence Agency was questioned by Jørgen Grønnegård Christensen, emeritus professor in political science (statskundskab) at Aarhus University calling Frederiksen's description of the agency as politically independent "literally ridiculous". The agency's lack of independence was backed by Eva Smith, professor at the University of Copenhagen's Faculty of Law who pointed out the agency consisted of officials "who rank lower in the hierarchy than the people whose responsibility they have to assess".

On 20 September, Rigspolitiet announced that officials Uffe Stormly and Birgitte Buch had received a warning. According to the Mink Commission, they had assisted in "breach of the duty of truth and the principle of legality in connection with the police's use of action cards on 6 November 2020". On 22 September, the Ministry of Food stated that the officials Tejs Binderup, Paolo Drostby, and Hanne Larsen had also received a warning. On the same day, Anne-Mette Lyhne Jensen was also given a warning in the Ministry of Justice. These decisions were also made on the basis of a review by the Danish Employee and Competence Agency.

=== Revoking of sanctions ===
On 30 December 2022 it was announced that Henrik Studsgaard would be new director in Esbjerg Municipality and that the Employee and Competence Agency due to him no longer being employed in the State halted all further investigation into his role in the cull and put down all charges. On 10 February 2023, Thorkild Fogde re-entered office after being acquitted in an inquiry, minister of justice Peter Hummelgaard stating that "The interrogation management led by former Supreme Court President Thomas Rørdam has concluded that Thorkild Fogde has not committed any misconduct. I have naturally based the decision on the conclusion of the interrogation management. National Police Chief Thorkild Fogde will on this basis re-enter into duty". On 23 March 2023, the Ministry of State, acting on the recommendation of the Danish Employee and Competence Agency, withdrew Bertelsen's disciplinarity warning while the Ministry of Justice on the same day withdrew Johan Legarth's reprimand and Anne-Mette Lyhne Jensen's warning. These decisions were also based on an assessment by Thomas Rørdam. During the following two months, three additional warnings were revoked by the authorities, so that ultimately only two civil servants received a warning for their actions in the affair.

Table of the 10 officials criticised by the Mink Commission
| Name | Position | Ministry/agency | Consequence |
|---|---|---|---|
| Barbara Bertelsen | Head of Department | Ministry of State | Warning (later revoked) |
| Henrik Studsgaard | Head of Department | Ministry of Food | Temporarily relieved of duty, further inquiry stopped after change of job |
| Johan Legarth | Head of Department | Ministry of Justice | Reprimand (Note: "Irettesættelse" with the closest English equivalents being reprimand (reprimande) or correction (korrektion) is a stronger expression of disapproval than simply a warning (advarsel).) (later revoked) |
| Anne-Mette Lyhne Jensen | Division manager | Ministry of Justice | Warning (later revoked) |
| Tejs Binderup | Division manager | Ministry of Food | Warning |
| Paolo Drostby | Office manager | Ministry of Food | Warning (later revoked) |
| Thorkild Fogde | National Police Commissioner | Rigspolitiet | Acquitted after inquiry |
| Uffe Stormly | Police Inspector | Rigspolitiet | Warning (later revoked) |
| Birgitte Buch | Legal Section Manager | Rigspolitiet | Warning (later revoked) |
| Hanne Larsen | Veterinary Director | Veterinary and Food Agency | Warning |

== Political consequences ==
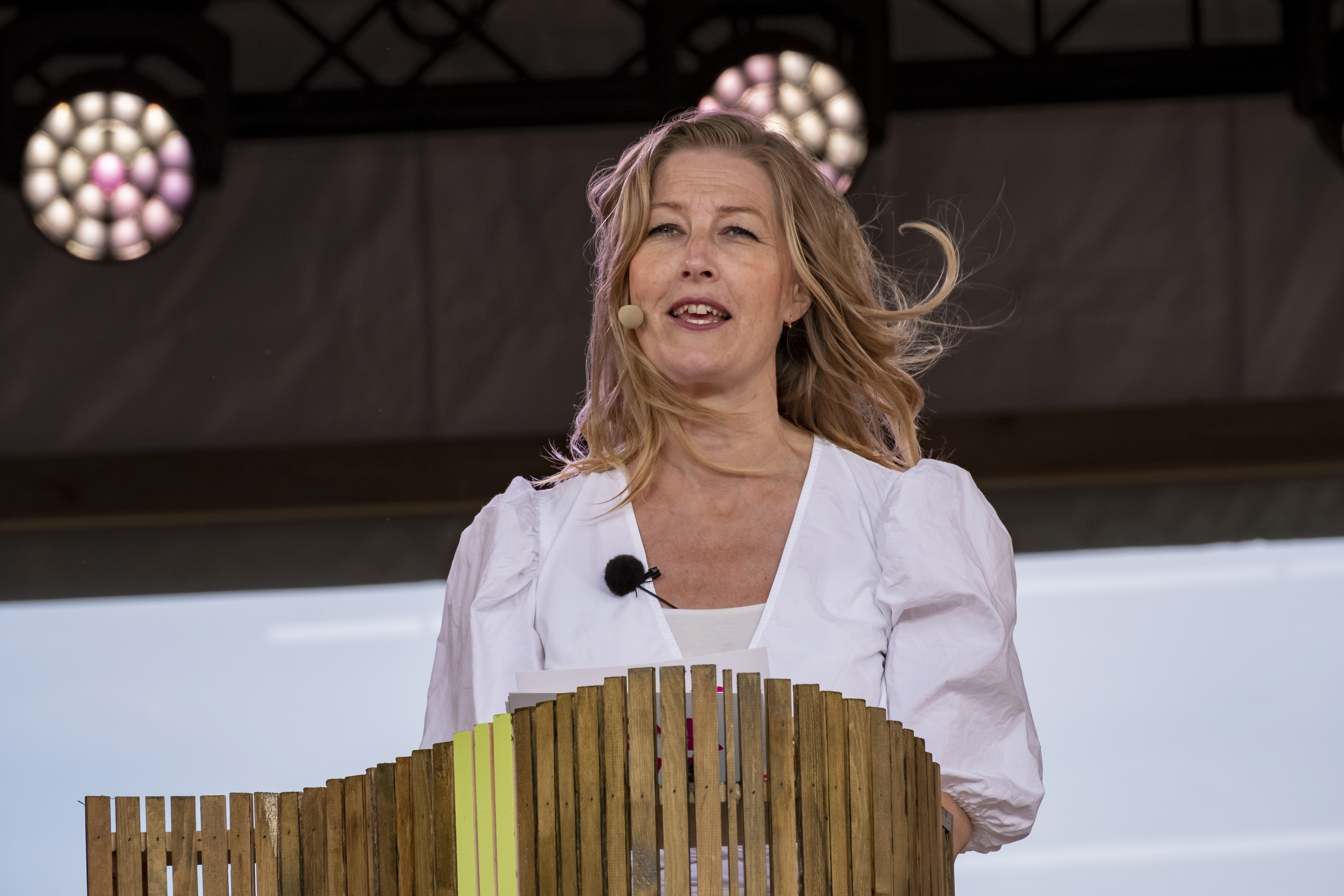
Radikale Venstre leader Sofie Carsten Nielsen who caused a general election on the basis of the Mink Commission's report

Due to the Mink Commission's report of 30 June containing criticism against Frederiksen and Jensen, on 5 June, a majority in the Folketing consisting of Socialdemokratiet (their own party), Radikale Venstre, Socialistisk Folkeparti, and Enhedslisten censured the two for their role in the case. The majority stated e.g. that the PM during the case had "behaved very objectionable, and the majority expresses a severe criticism of the Prime Minister".

Immediately after the Mink Commission had submitted its report, a majority of the Inquiry Committee (Note: After number of seat per 1 June 2022: Socialdemokratiet (49), Radikale Venstre (14), Socialistisk Folkeparti (15), and Enhedslisten (13).) announced that, after careful consideration, they had found no reason to bring charges before the Supreme Court (Rigsretten).

A minority in the Committee (Note: After number of seat per 1 June 2022: Venstre (39), Det Konservative Folkeparti (13), Dansk Folkeparti (6), Nye Borgerlige (4), Liberal Alliance (3), and Frie Grønne (3).) referred to the commission's lack of competence to legally assess the responsibility of ministers, which is why the commission "has not carried out an assessment of whether, among other things, there is gross negligence among the criticised ministers, including Prime Minister Mette Frederiksen and Minister of the Environment and Food Mogens Jensen", whereupon the minority concluded that "the only right thing is for the Folketing to have an impartial lawyer's assessment of the commission's report".

Despite the Radikale Venstre party being a part of the majority in the Inquiry Committee against setting up of a lawyer investigation, the party announced as a political consequence that if Frederiksen did not call a general election at the latest by the opening of the Folketing on 4 October, the party would overthrow the government by a vote of no confidence. (Note: Due to the Folketing's rules of procedure this could practically only happen after the opening of the Folketing on 6 October, why Radikale Venstre postponed the deadline.) Referencing to the parliamentary majority for the election, Frederiksen announced on 5 October that she had recommended Queen Margrethe II to hold the election on Tuesday 1 November 2022.

== Legal assessments outside the Mink Commission ==
=== Question of gross negligence (grov uagtsomhed) ===
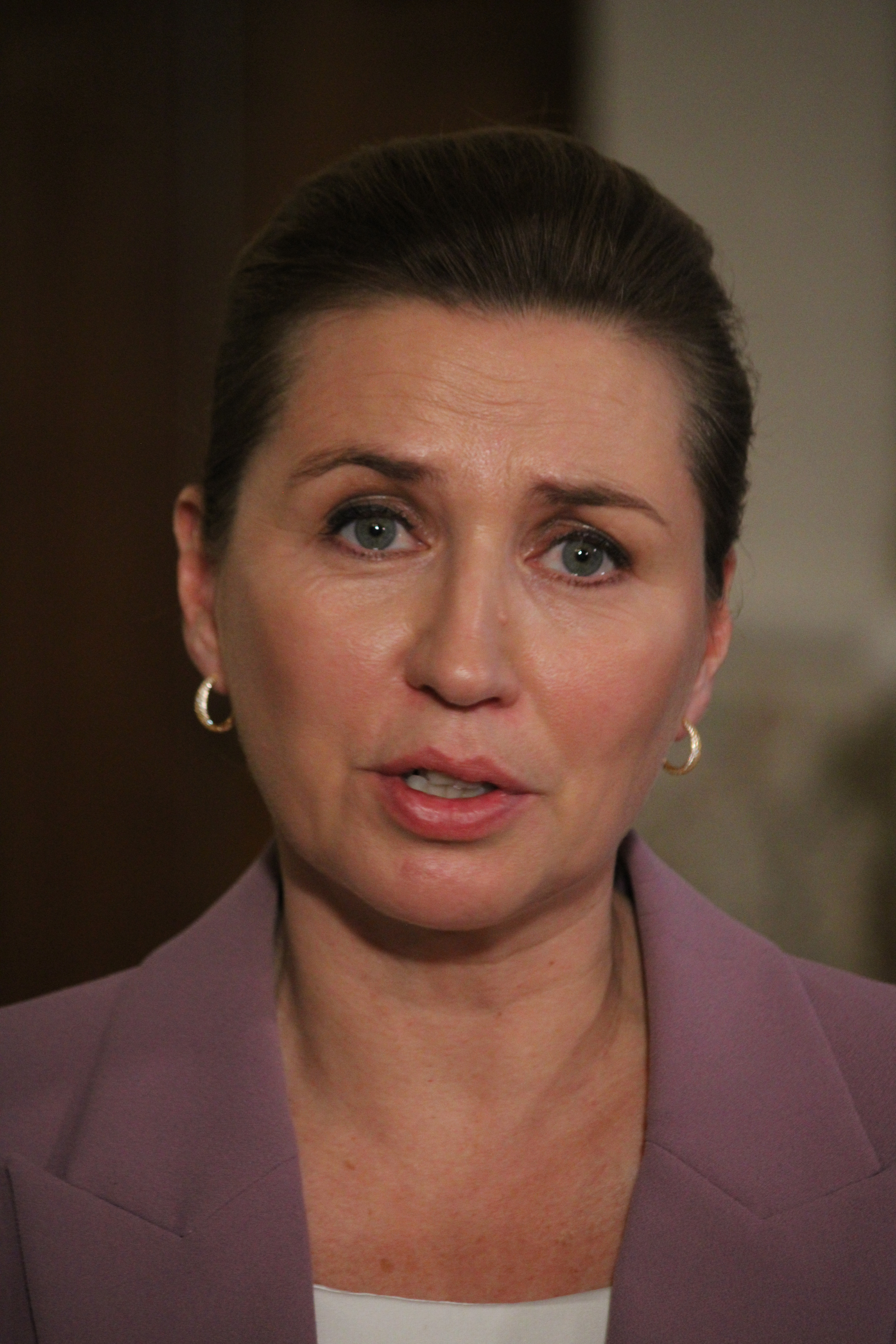
Frederiksen apologised for the process while throughout the case maintaining that it was well-justified in terms of health to cull all mink. She said that she would have done the same again. This largely was with reference to "public health" (folkesundheden)

A central question in the public after it became clear that there had not been legal authority behind the original order to kill all mink was, whether the government and Frederiksen particularly had been aware of this and thus consciously breaking the law. This was therefore also a significant part of the Mink Commission's terms of reference to investigate how and when Frederiksen and the other ministers became aware of possible issues with legal authority. As previously mentioned, the commission concluded that the members of government only had been made aware of the problems after the decision was made and announced at the press conference on 5 November, thus not having committed gross negligence. In case they had, they would have violated the Ministerial Liability Act (ministeransvarlighedsloven) and the commission did not have a mandate to assess criminal liability of ministers. Following the presentation of the commission report this was discussed among legal experts who almost unanimously assessed that there was not a basis for convicting Frederiksen for gross negligence. Legal experts expressing this opinion were professor of administrative law at Aalborg University Sten Bønsing, professor of public law at Aarhus University Jørgen Albæk Jensen, professor of constitutional law at the University of Copenhagen Jens Elo Rytter, professor Kristian Lauta of the University of Copenhagen, emeritus professor of criminal law of the University of Copenhagen Jørn Vestergaard, professor Frederik Waage of the University of Southern Denmark, emeritus professor in administrative law at the University of Copenhagen Carsten Henrichsen, emerita professor at the University of Copenhagen Eva Smith, and emeritus professor at the University of Copenhagen Ditlev Tamm. National judge (landsdommer) Bo Østergaard expressed the same analysis as well.

A single professor, Lasse Lund Madsen from the Department of Law at Aarhus University, found the immediate appearance of Frederiksen's actions to fulfill the criteria of gross negligence. Lund Madsen added a few months later that he did not think with the then-present basis would make sense to conduct impeachment proceedings against Frederiksen, and that he saw no reason to make an impartial lawyer's assessment focusing on the Prime Minister's liability, as he found the matter to be already as well illuminated as it could be.

==== Lund Elmer Sandager ====
After a majority in the Folketing at the beginning of July had refused to initiate an impartial lawyer's assessment of the legal liability of the ministers involved, the opposition party Nye Borgerlige collected funds for making an assessment of their own, hiring the law firm Lund Elmer Sandager for this. On 22 September, the law firm presented its legal assessment, in which they assessed that Jensen and Frederiksen would be found guilty by impeachment, but acquitted other involved ministers. The lawyers' assessment was sharply criticised in numerous media by professor Jens Elo Rytter and professor emeritus Jørn Vestergaard, who believed that there were several gaps in the lawyers' legal assessment, pointed out that the lawyers behind the assessment were commercial lawyers and did not have the sufficient professional qualifications to assess the specific issue, and found it striking that they reached the exact opposite conclusion to what numerous independent legal experts had said publicly.

==== Legal assessment from law professors ====
On 7 November 2022, the three professors Jens Elo Rytter, Jørn Vestergaard, and Jørgen Albæk Jensen published a 30-page memo entitled Legal assessment of the question of Prime Minister Mette Frederiksen's liability in the Mink Case (Retlig vurdering af spørgsmålet om statsminister Mette Frederiksens ansvar i Minksagen), which they handed over to the parties in the Folketing. The three professors from the Universities of Copenhagen and Aarhus had drawn up the memo on their own initiative, referring to the fact that there had been persistent requests from political parties for a legal assessment of Frederiksen's potential legal liability in the case. In the assessment, they concluded that it could not be expected that Frederiksen would be convicted for gross negligence under the Ministerial Liability Act, and that she would therefore not be found guilty in a possible impeachment case. They assessed that it was understandable and excusable that Frederiksen did not become aware of the legal issue, because no one in the civil service had in any way drawn her attention to the problem, and because she should rightly have confidence that the officials would have uncovered any relevant issues during the time available. They also pointed out that even for the responsible officials, the question of authority was a legally difficult challenge to clarify proving to require quite detailed investigations of a complicated legal basis.

=== Differentiation between different models for the industry ===
In the meeting material for the government's K-committee meeting, where the decision was made, two models were proposed

1. Putting the mink industry into hibernation. This would mean culling most mink, but allowing the breeding animals to survive, so that the mink industry could be revived after the coronavirus pandemic. (Such an option was, among other things, outlined by SSI at a meeting on 2 November.)
2. Shutting down the industry. That would mean culling all mink and banning mink farming.

It appeared from the appendices that there was most likely no legal authority backing any of them. The government said it chose a third model which consisted of a slaughter of all mink, but not a permanent ban on mink breeding. This model was also illegal without new legislation. In November 2020, Frederiksen stated i.a. in the before Parliament, "There is politics, and then there is law. The government has not made a decision to close down the mink industry. The government has made a decision that the mink must be culled. It is two different decisions". Law professor Kristian Lauta commented on this that "The only straw they have left is that there is a difference between culling all mink and completely and partially ending the industry. But I don't understand that there should be a difference. It is very difficult to run mink breeding without mink". Professor of administrative and constitutional law Frederik Waage assessed that the Frederiksen's statement that the decision to cull all mink was not the same as shutting down the industry was fairly correct, but that the two models would have the same effect In leaked internal documents from before the order was given at the press conference on 4 November 2020, officials and Jensen described the decision as a de facto closure of the industry.

=== The right to property ===
Section 73, subsection 1 of the Danish constitution reads, "The right to property is inviolable. No one can be forced to give up their property, except where the public good requires it. This can only be done according to law and against full compensation". The law professors Kristian Lauta, Mikael Rask Madsen, Henrik Palmer Olsen, Frederik Waage and Jens Elo Rytter as well as lawyer Jonas Christoffersen has criticised the order to cull all mink outside the original locally delimited zones as unconstitutional. Waage and Rytter points out simultaneously that it seen from a legal perspective is irrelevant, whether it was a breach of the constitution or just a "customary" breach of law, as it does not change the implications regarding responsibility.

Judicial experts have in their criticism asserted that a stricter requirement for legal basis (skærpet hjemmelskrav), is in place when the government gives an order with such great ramifications for the right to property.

On 27 October, the organisation Bæredygtigt Landbrug (lit. 'Sustainable Agriculture') sued the Danish state on behalf of three former mink breeders for violations against the European Convention on Human Rights, protocol 1, article 1, regarding respect for property rights in respect to the culling injunction for all mink without the necessary legal basis.

=== Duty of journalising (journaliseringspligten) ===
According to Section 15 of the Public Disclosure Act (offentlighedsloven), all documents "that have been received or sent by an administrative authority as part of administrative case processing (...) to the extent that the document is important for a case or the case processing in general" must be journalised. The Mink Commission did not take a decision on whether there had been a breach of this obligation in connection with the destruction of possible evidence in the form of the deleted text messages.

Professor Frederik Waage assessed that the deletion was by all accounts in violation with the duty of journalising and stated, "It is highly problematic that the Prime Minister and her Head of Department expose themselves to questions about compliance with the duty of journalising when, as here, it is about cleaning up after a clear violation of the law in relation to the culling of mink". Professor of administrative law Sten Bønsing endorsed the criticism and said that the fulfillment of this duty had "obviously" not taken place in the case of the deleted text messages.

== Financial compensation ==
=== Compensation agreement ===
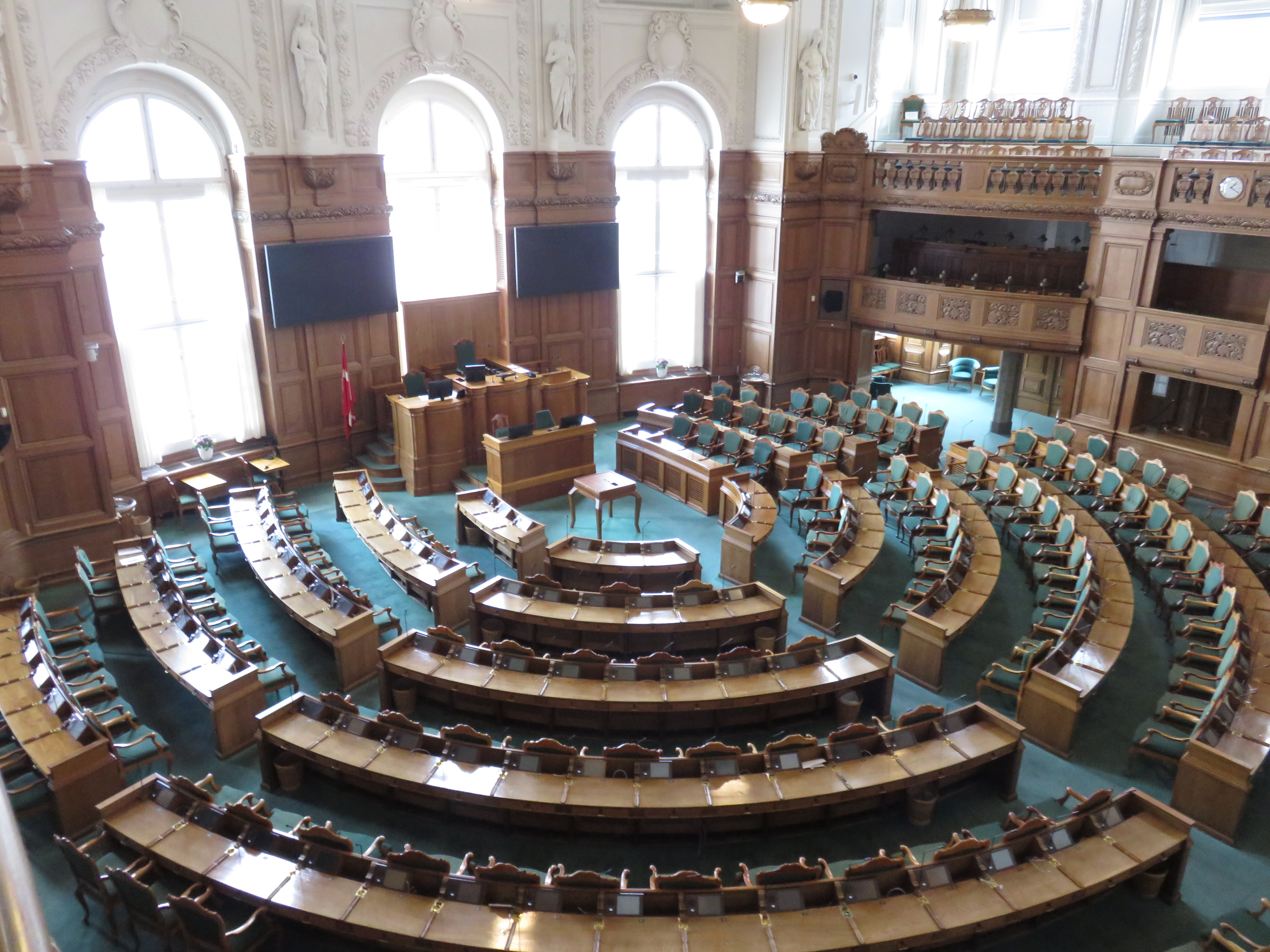
The session hall of the Folketing where the compensation bill was adopted

By the time of the announcement of the government's decision, no compensation agreement was prepared. On 25 January 2021 a compensation agreement for the mink breeders was adopted in the Folketing. (Note: Behind in the agreement were the Social Democrats, the Liberal Party, the Radical Liberal Party, the Socialist People's Party, and the Liberal Alliance.) The agreement included a framework of 1.8-2.8 billion kr. in direct compensation for the mink that were culled in 2020 without being furred. In addition, 8.9 billion kr. was given in compensation for loss of future source of income and compensation for the residual value of the production apparatus, which no longer had value for the mink breeder. A number of ancillary industries directly dependent on mink breeding – including feed centres, furriers, auction houses, and transport companies – were awarded compensation for the loss of the part of their business that concerned the Danish mink industry. It was estimated in the agreement to entail costs of 3-4 billion kr. According to its wording, the agreement was to provide full compensation to mink breeders and employees of mink dependent ancillary industries, regardless of whether the culling could legally be described as expropriation according to Section 73 of the Constitution. According to the think tank Kraka, the agreement entailed a compensation of between 11 and 13 million kr. for each mink breeder, a significant overcompensation for the industry. Researcher Henning Otte Hansen at the Institute of Food and Resource Economics (Institut for Fødevare- og Ressourceøkonomi) at the University of Copenhagen also believed that the substitutes were on the upper end of what was natural.

=== Implementation (udmøntning) ===
The compensation to the individual mink companies was to depend on assessments made by "a special compensation and valuation commission for handling the mink compensations". On 18 December 2021, the Ministry of Food announced, after the establishment of six compensation and assessment commissions, that the assessment of the mink companies would begin.

On 23 September 2022, based on SSI's assessment, the government decided to lift the ban on mink breeding from 1 January 2023. However, only 14 mink companies had applied for hibernation compensation and thus the possibility to resume mink breeding later against 1,223 who had applied for shutdown compensation equivalent to approx. 1% of the profession. Of this, it was Tage Pedersen's assessment in August of that year that between one and four would actually end up restarting. Mink breeders who chose to restart had to continue to comply with infection prevention measures, including testing of mink, use of protective equipment and hygiene course. The responsible minister, Rasmus Prehn, said about this, "It would not be possible for the mink industry to start up again without these measures. If we do not have these rules of the game, then it might be too big a risk to start up again".

According to the Ministry of Food, payments to the mink breeders as of 2 September 2022 had cost the Danish state 6.6 billion kr. However, the total cost of payments is expected to be in the region of 20 billion kr.

Officially, in June 2022, the Veterinary Food Administration expected that the valuation commissions would be completed in 2024. However, in September 2022, the Danish Transport Agency, which was the secretariat for the independent valuation commissions, informed the Ministry of Food and Agriculture that, based on the experience from the first 25 cases, it could take until 2027 before all mink breeders would be compensated.

After rulings in the first 51 compensation cases (corresponding to approx. 5% of the more than 1,000 cases) on 31 January 2024, the Ministry of Food revised up its estimate of the total compensation bill from 17.6 to just below 24 billion kr. In March 2024, Zetland ran a story about potential conflicts of interest among members of the commissions, after which the political parties behind the agreement in April changed the distribution of commission seats to no longer include mink breeders. In return, think tanks such as CEPOS, Kraka, Arbejderbevægelsens Erhvervsråd, and Justitia were given the options of appointing representatives to the commissions. A simplified compensation model was introduced on 1 October 2023, which breeders had until 31 December 2024 to apply for.

== Criticism by the opposition ==
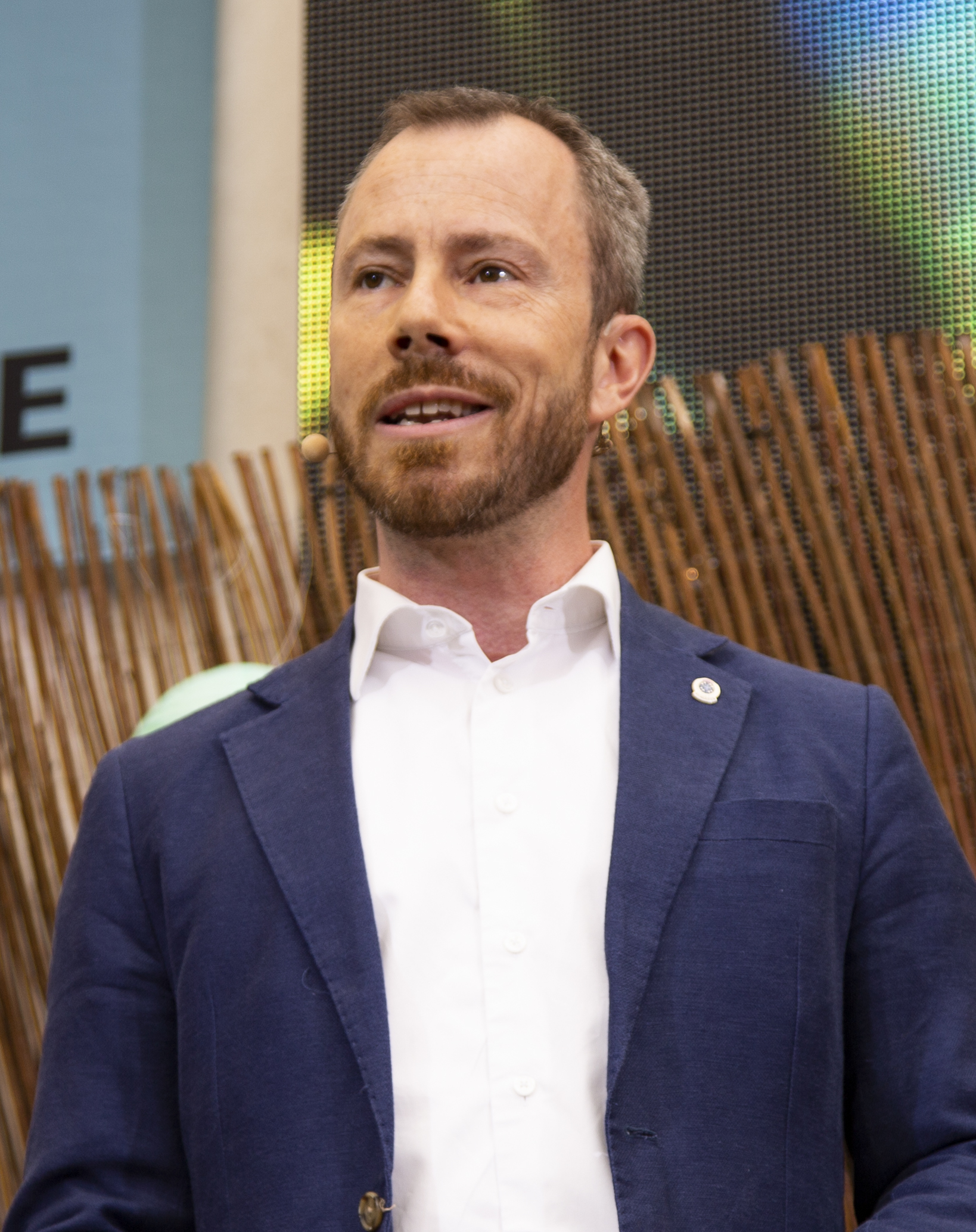
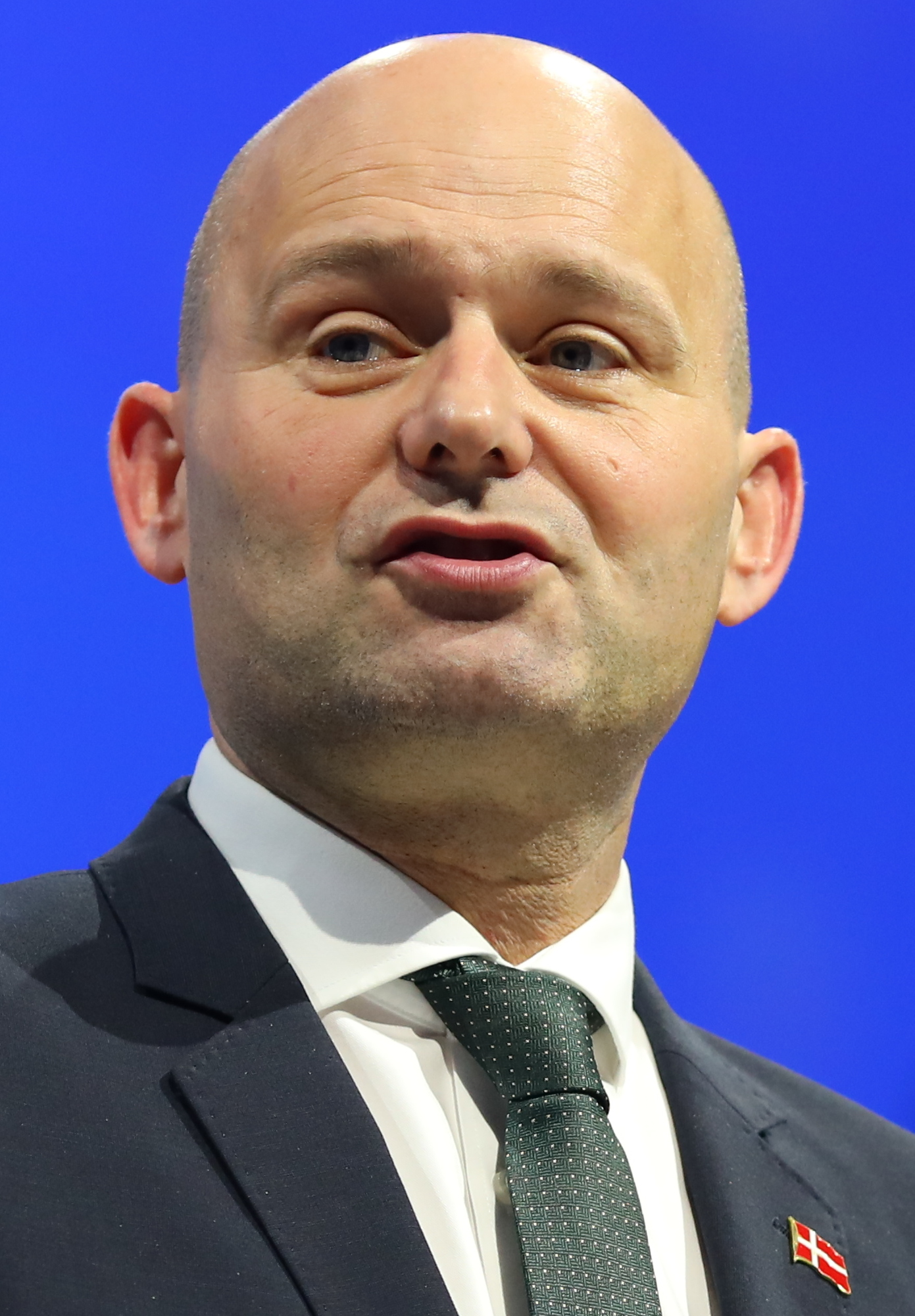
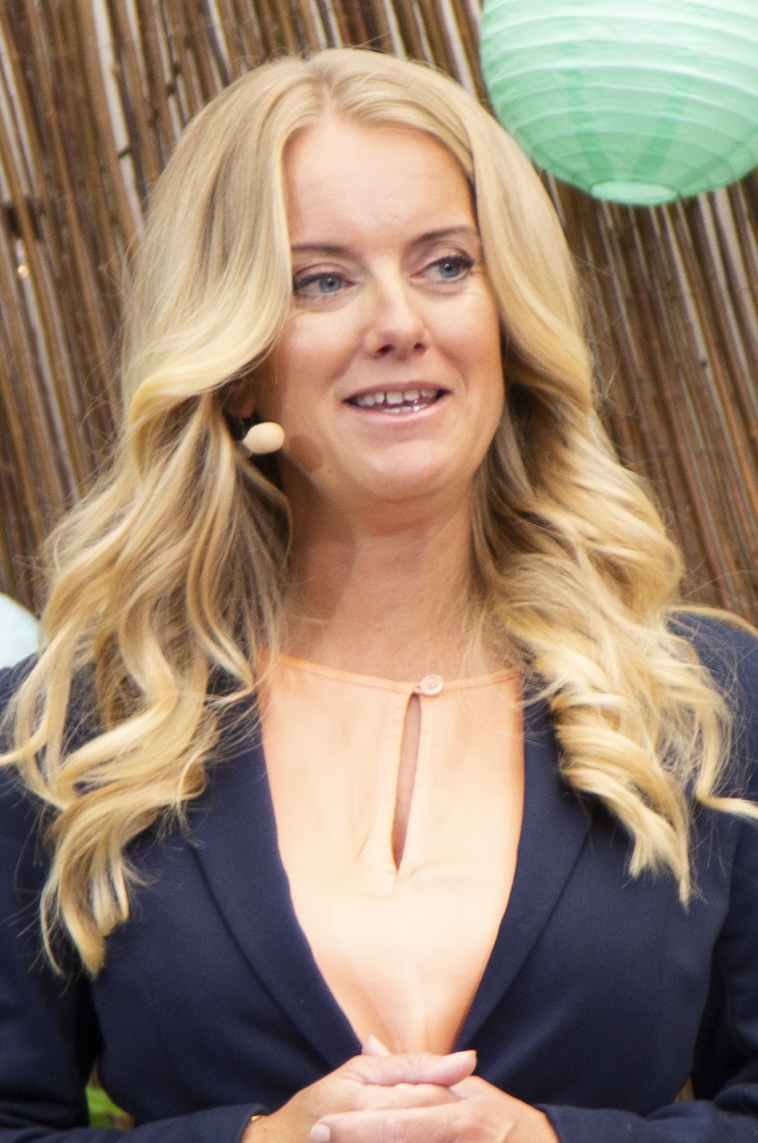
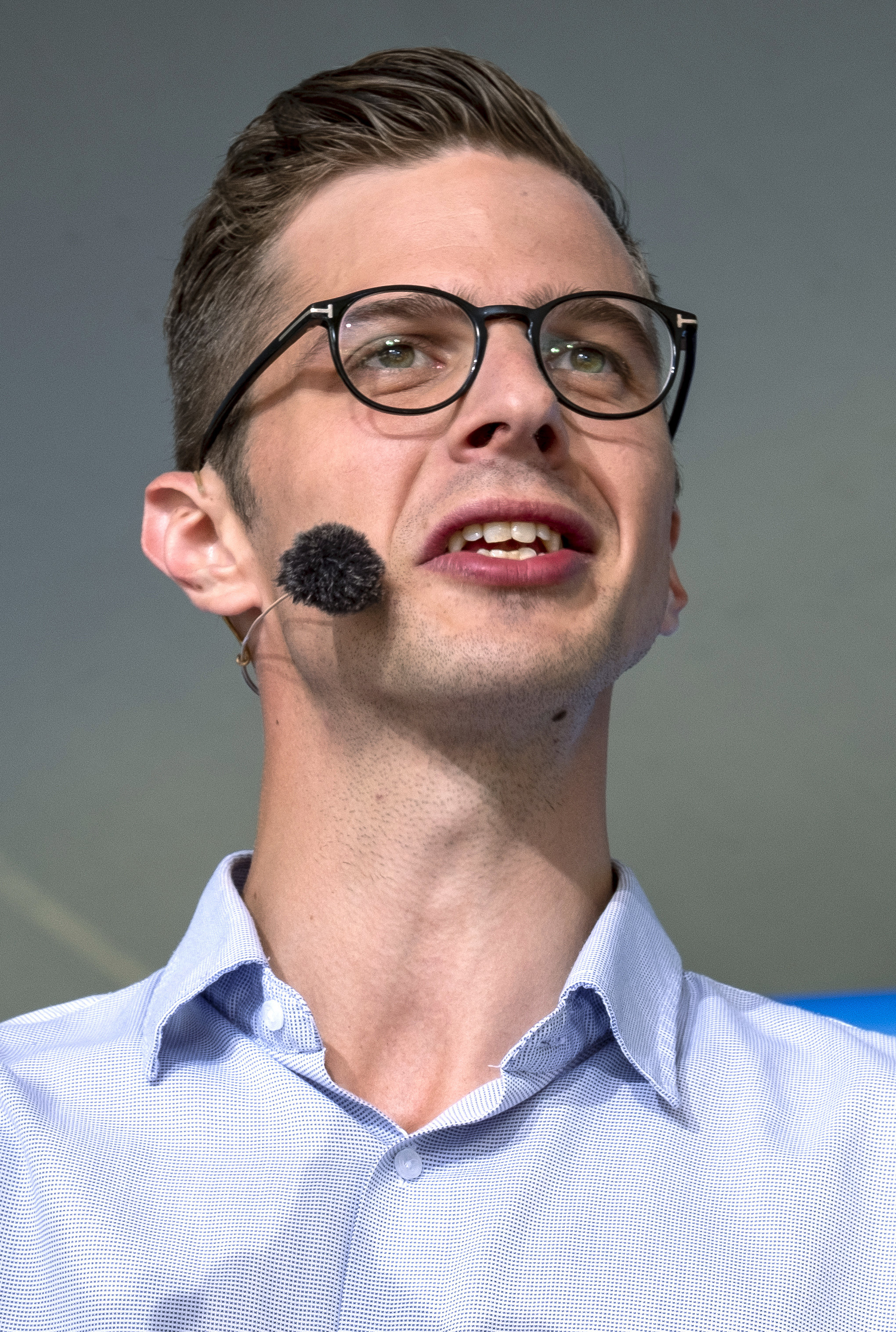
The right-wing opposition formulated throughout the case a substantial amount of criticism directed towards the government and Frederiksen. Shown are party leaders who were leaders of their respective parties during the entire timeline. From the left: Jakob Ellemann (V), Søren Pape (K), Pernille Vermund (NB), Alex Vanopslagh (LA).

Criticisms from the political opposition restated to a high degree the legal and medical criticisms. The opposition parties in the blue block criticised the government for having ordered all mink in Denmark culled without legal basis, as well as the government in its subsequent actions to have brought the mink breeders in an uncertain judicial situation.

The opposition parties also criticised the government's decision-making for having been on an insufficient professional background, and that professionals within the SSI should not have had exclusive access to the data on preliminary studies, a so-called second opinion.

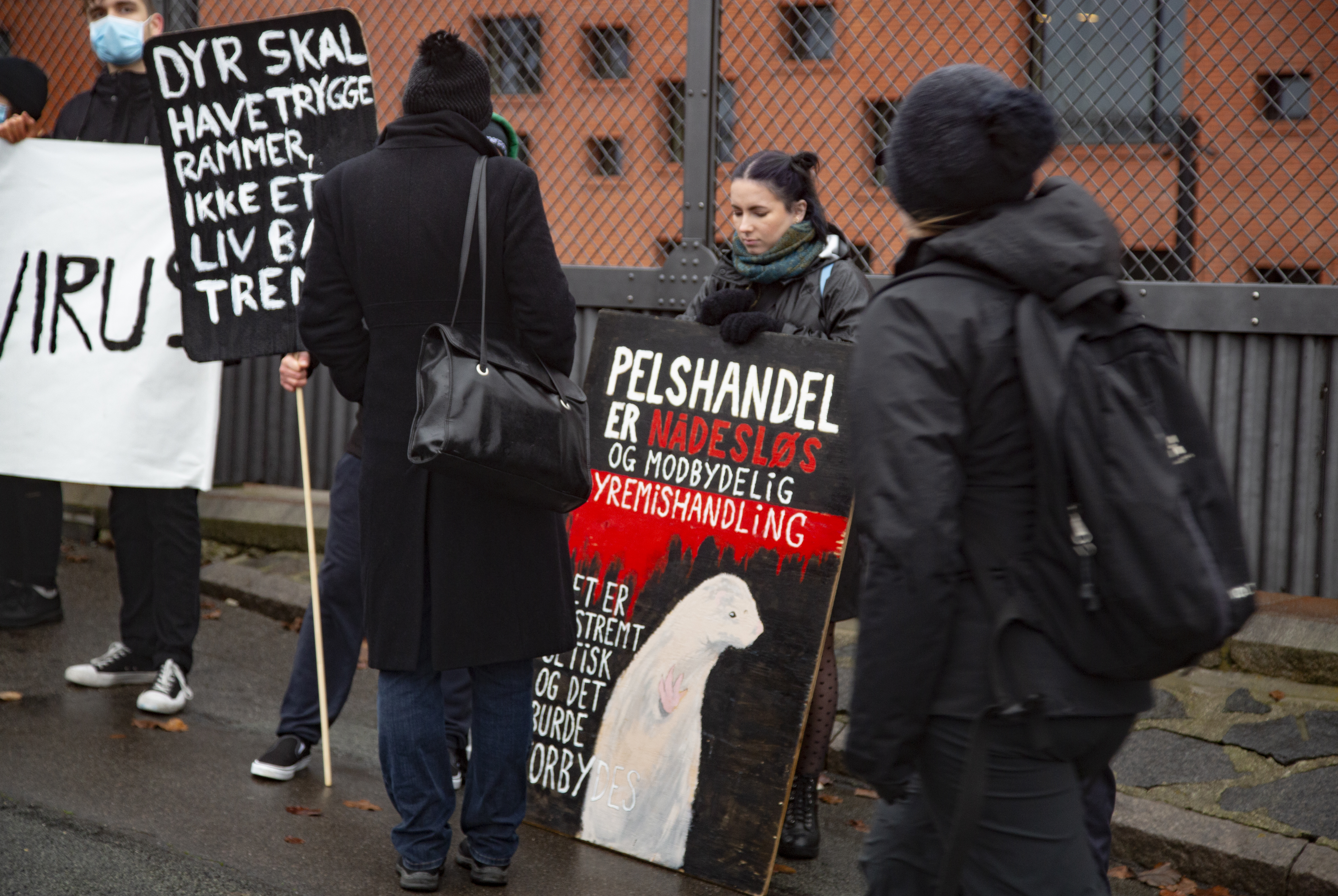
People with signs protest in Copenhagen on 21 November 2020.

Frederiksen apologised on several occasions for the process with the lack of legal basis, but pointed out the background, where the government received a serious risk assessment and had a responsibility to act, not exclusively for the sake of the Danes but foreign countries as well. The government also underlined that the responsible officials during the undertaking were in an extremely physiologically stressful state of being and only endeavoured to act in accordance with interests of public health.

In an opinion poll conducted by Epinion for Altinget.dk in April 2022 on whether mink breeding should again be allowed in Denmark, 46% of respondents were in favour, 37% against and 16% answered "Don't know". (Note: The remaining one % answered "Don't wish to answer".)

Frederiksen was criticised, among other things, by Venstre's chairman Jakob Ellemann-Jensen for showing absolute power (magtfuldkommenhed) during the process. In September 2022, Frederiksen stated that, in her opinion, the criticism of her as being powerful could partly be attributed to her being a woman.

The party Liberal Alliance referred to the case as "the biggest political scandal in the history of Denmark". Frederiksen stated on 24 August 2022 that she did not find reason to necessarily call the case a scandal, but that a mistake had been made, as there was a lack of legal basis for a decision that was otherwise necessary. After criticism from different sides, she clarified six days later that she indeed found it to be "a political scandal".

During the election campaign, the opposition politicians in the blue block announced that if the majority in the Folketing would shift after the election, they would initiate an impartial lawyer's assessment of the legal responsibilities of Frederiksen and other ministers in the case. Five days after the presentation of the Mink Commission's report, the party of Alternativet announced that they "of course" also supported a lawyer's assessment, which they ran on. Furthermore, the chairman of Moderaterne, Lars Løkke Rasmussen, in September referred to a lawyer's assessment of the Mink Commission's report as an ultimatum to support any government and repeated this during the election campaign in October, where he, among other things, stated, "I am sure that if we do not reach a dignified ending for this matter, we will be gambling with democracy, regardless of which government comes after this election".

== 2022 general election and afterwards ==
Seat distribution in the Folketing after the 2022 general election. (Note: Enhedslisten (9), Socialistisk Folkeparti (15), Alternativet (6), Inuit Ataqatigiit (1), Siumut (1), Socialdemokratiet (50), Javnaðarflokkurin (1), Radikale Venstre (7), Moderaterne (16), Sambandsflokkurin (1), Det Konservative Folkeparti (10), Venstre (23), Liberal Alliance (14), Danmarksdemokraterne (14), Dansk Folkeparti (5), Nye Borgerlige (6).)

The general election on 1 November gave Frederiksen's ruling Social Democratic party their strongest showing in more than 20 years with 27.6% of the vote, which was viewed as a public vote of confidence in her handling of the COVID-19 pandemic. The party together with its supporting "red bloc" obtained a majority of seats without the blue bloc and Moderaterne. On the day following the election, the political leader of Alternativet, Franciska Rosenkilde, announced that the party would nevertheless not support a lawyer's assessment of the Mink Commission's report. On 3 November, after being overruled by her newly elected parliamentary group, Rosenkilde announced that her party once again supported a lawyer assessment. Simultaneously, Løkke Rasmussen also became ambiguous about the demand for a lawyer's assessment. Succeeding a new, during the government negotiations submitted, own-initiative lawyer's assessment compiled by three professors, in which it was concluded that Mette Frederiksen likely would not be convicted if going to the Supreme Court, Alternativet once again became ambiguous on the demand and said they would read the assessment and announce their position in "a couple of weeks". On 7 December the party announced their continued support for a lawyer's assessment.

Election researcher Niels Nørgaard Kristensen, Aalborg University, and the historian Christian Egander Skov assessed that the opposition parties during the election campaign had overestimated the impact of the mink case, and that the election result showed a "mink fatigue" to have set in among parts of the electorate, not perceiving it as an important election issue. In their 2024 book Partiledernes kamp om midten analyzing the election, Kasper Møller Hansen and Rune Stubager confirmed that the mink culling did not rank among the important election themes in the eyes of the voters. In January 2023, Danish People's Party leader Morten Messerschmidt described it likewise as a mistake that the Blue Block had focused so much on the mink cull.

=== Frederiksen II Cabinet ===
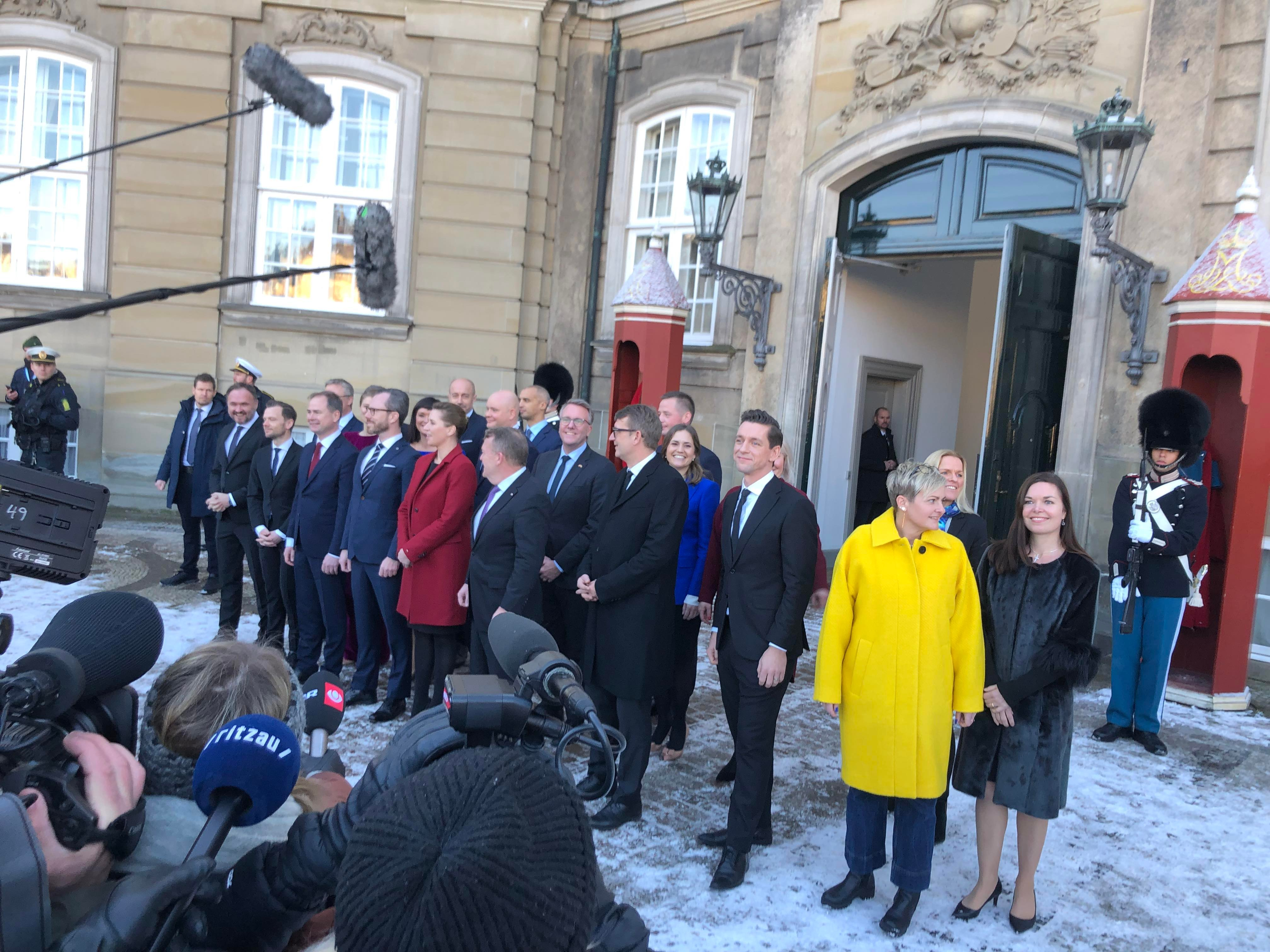
Frederiksen II first public appearance on 15 December 2022 at Amalienborg after having been presented before the Queen. Frederiksen (in red) with Ellemann to her right and Løkke to her left

The negotiations on a new government were formally initiated on 4 November at the prime ministerial residence Marienborg. On 7 December the negotiations beat the record for the longest government negotiations in Danish history. In the finishing stages of the negotiations Venstre leader Jakob Ellemann-Jensen and Lars Løkke Rasmussen announced on 11 December that they both would no longer support a lawyer's assessment of the 2020 Danish mink cull. On 13 December it was announced that the three parties Socialdemokratiet, Moderaterne, and Venstre had reached an agreement and Frederiksen's second government would be inaugurated on 15 December. On 15 December Ellemann-Jensen received the title of Minister of Defence and Deputy Prime Minister with Løkke becoming Minister of Foreign Affairs. Political Altinget editor of Esben Schjørring described Ellemann's credibility loss in the mink case as a major contributing cause for his later departure from politics in October 2023.

A poll by Danish analysis institute Megafon showed on 24 December that 65% of Venstre voters entirely or predominantly disagreeing with the decision not to have a lawyer's assessment with the number only being 47% for voters of Moderaterne and 5% for social democratic voters.

In accordance with the Ministerial Liability Act, ministers' criminal liability expires after five years, meaning the case will be out of date from November 2025.

After the ban expired on 1 January 2023, the first mink entered Denmark again on 14 January as import from Norway to a mink breeder on Thyholm who was among the 13 mink breeders in total to have applied to restart the breeding.

On 20 June, Venstre minister Troels Lund Poulsen stated that after a long investigation, neither the Defence Intelligence Service nor the Centre for Cyber Security had been able to revive Frederiksen's deleted text messages.

== See also ==
- Timeline of the 2020 Danish mink cull (in Danish)
- Political impact of the COVID-19 pandemic
- Impeachment of Inger Støjberg
- Instruction Commission (in Danish)
- Tamil Case
- Tibet flag case
- IC4 case (in Danish)
- Eritrea Case (in Danish)
