= Great Greenland Furhouse =

Clothing and fur production company in Greenland

- Company type: Aktieselskab
- Industry: Fashion, Fur trade
- Founded: 1985
- Founder: Hans Lassen
- Headquarters: Qaqortoq, Greenland
- Key people: Bruno Olesen (Chairman); Preben Møller (CEO)
- Products: Haute couture, Ready to wear, Accessories, Footwear & Fur
- Net income: ▲DKK 68,763,000 (2006)
- Number of employees: 64
- Website: greatgreenland.com

Great Greenland Furhouse is a tanning and production company that processes furs and sells clothing, fashion wear and other products made of Greenland fur and seal skin, located in Qaqortoq, south Greenland. The company operates based on a service contract between the Government of Greenland and Great Greenland A/S.

The company purchases seal skin from all over Greenland. The company owns trading stations, skin centers, in Maniitsoq, Nuuk, Tasiilaq, and Upernavik, as well as independent trading stations in smaller villages, totalling more than 70 independent trading stations. Dried seal skin can also be purchased from the smallest communities via the general store Pilersuisoq. In total, over 2,500 people are involved in the seal skin trade. This makes Great Greenland Furhouse one of the biggest employers in the entire country. Of the 64 people directly employed the company, 51 are working in Qaqortoq, making Great Greenland one of the biggest employers in the town.

== History ==
The company was created in 1977 as the Grønlandsgarveriet (The tannery of Greenland) by Hans Lassen. It specialized in tanning seal skin. In 1982, Grønlandsgarveriet became government-owned. The company name was changed to Great Greenland in 1991.

From 2005 to 2012, the company recorded a deficit in yearly revenues. In 2013, it recovered with a NOK 5.9 million profit. The company had been seeking legal recovery after a former partner sold 58,000 of the company's furs without informing the company about it.

During the 2014 Kopenhagen Fur, Great Greenland sold 9,000 pieces during the world's largest fur auction.

=== Fur ban ===
The import and sale of seal fur is illegal in the United States, due to the 1972 U.S. Marine Mammal Protection Act. The act categorically bans "imports or sales of all marine mammal products", regardless of the conservation status of the animal. On May 5, 2009, the European Parliament voted in favour of an EU-wide ban on seal products, exemptions allowing limited seal product trade for Greenland Inuit. The majority of the fur products are headed for the European markets, with Denmark as the biggest customer.

Since the EEC seal skin ban in 1983, the company receives between 25 and 30 million DKK (3.5 to 4 mil EUR) annually to support and develop Greenlandic seal hunt and production. There are currently 1,900 licensed professional hunters on Greenland, of these an estimated 200 to 300 are economically dependent on supplying seal skins to Great Greenland. On average the professional hunters earn about 50,000 DKK (6,000 EUR) annually from hunting and coastal fishing, roughly 20% of this amount consists of direct subsidies from the Greenland Home Rule.

The EU's 2009 seal ban led the company to close it last sewing workshop in 2016. In 2017, the company estimated the number of seals in Greenland around 12 million. Following the ban, many Inuit chose fishing as a main source of income and trade, leading to a seal overpopulation and a sharp decline of fish stocks (fished by men and the growing seal population)

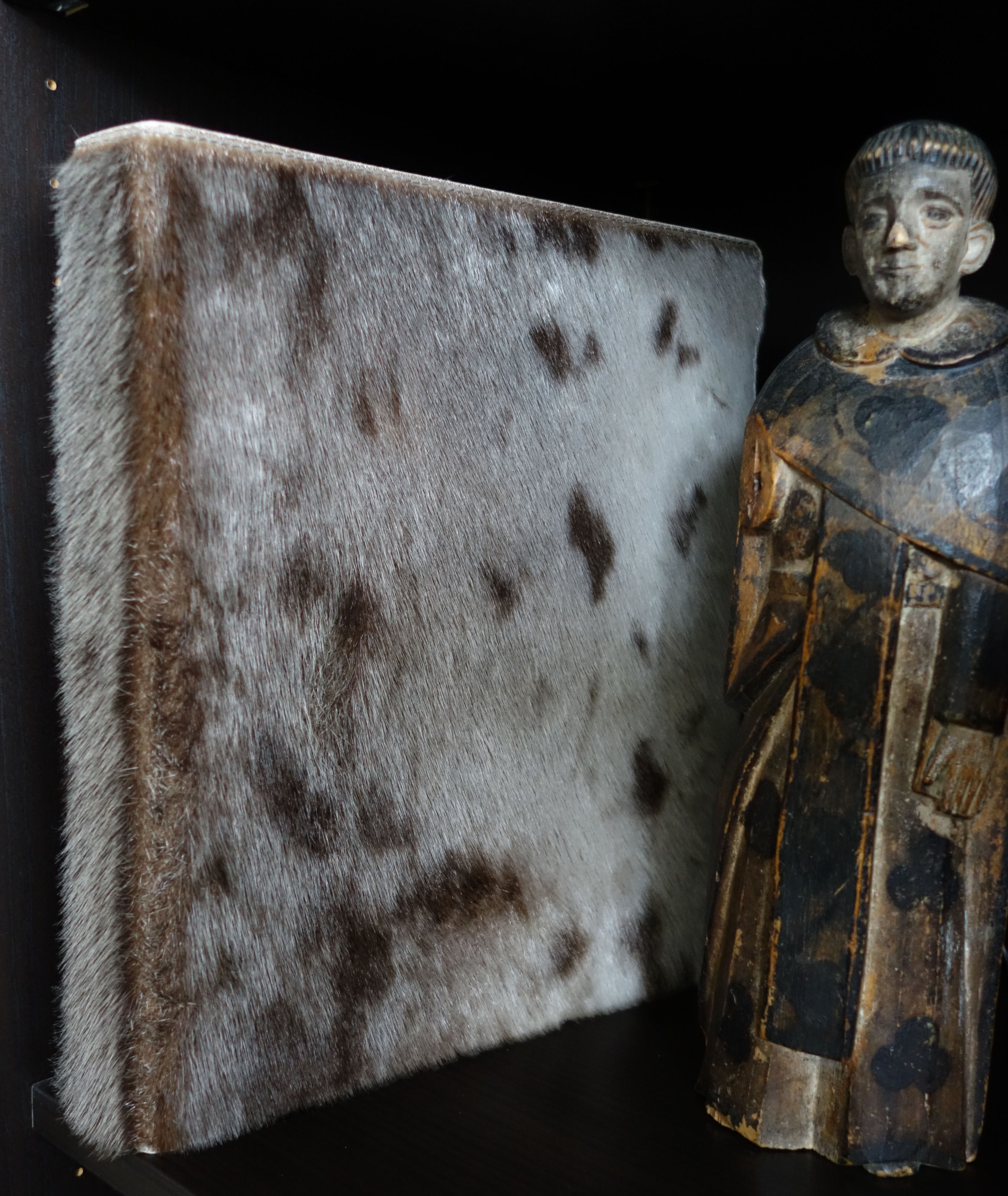
Seal skin folder, a product of Great Greenland A/S

== Governance ==
Board of directors:

- Juliane Henningsen
- Tommy Ege Kristensen
- Niels Eli Boassen
- Erik Sivertsen
- Anette Grønkjær Lings

== See also ==
- Kopenhagen Fur
- Seal hunting
