= Kopenhagen Fur =

Danish fur skin auction company

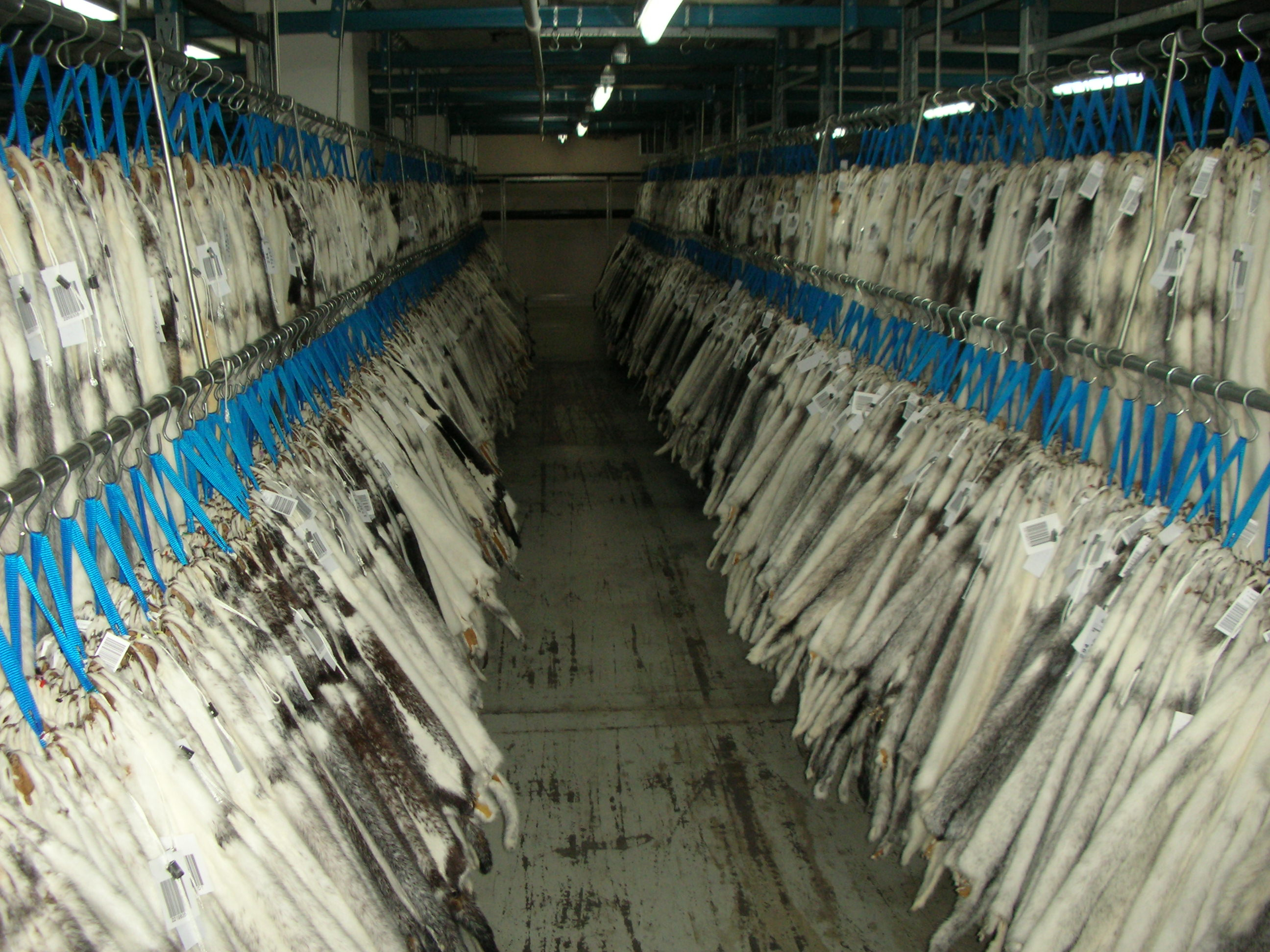
Black cross mink pelts at Kopenhagen Fur.

Kopenhagen Fur was the world's largest fur skin auction company. It was an agribusiness cooperative, located in Langagervej 60, Glostrup, near Copenhagen, Denmark. At peak demand, the company could pack and sort 150,000 furs in one day. In 2020, it was reported to be responsible for 40% of global mink fur production.

Kopenhagen Fur's business included production, classification and trade of mink fur, as well as offering workshop facilities and seminars for designers and researchers. Kopenhagen Studio has two locations: the Langelinie studio incorporates the company's workshop and marketing department while its Beijing studio at Tsinghua University trains fur designers.

== History ==
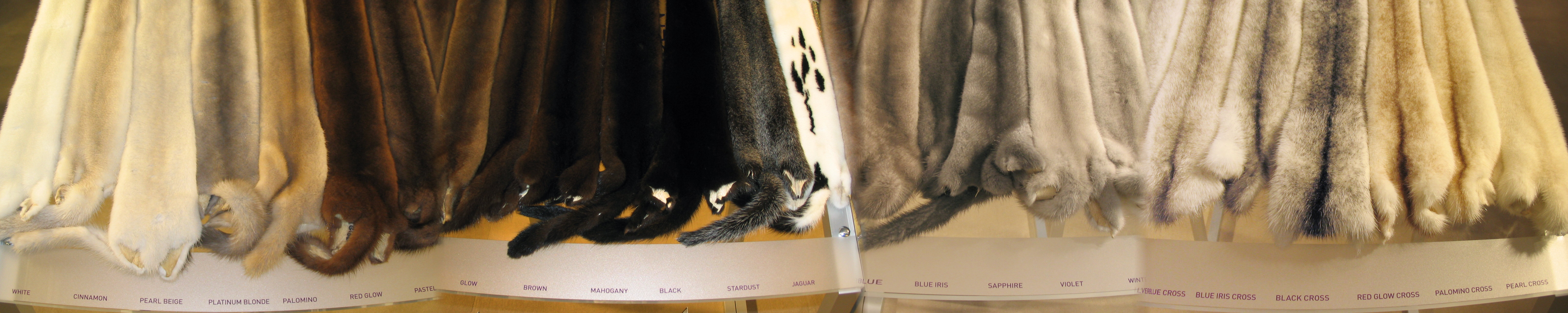
Mink colours at Kopenhagen Fur

Most of Europe's fur production was marketed by Finnish Fur Sales of Finland or Copenhagen Fur Center (CFC) of Denmark. Ninety percent of CFC's pelt skins were mink, while fox and fitch skins are also farmed and sold. International auctions occur five or six times every year.

After three years of planning, the Empress Chinchilla division of CFC, coordinated the worldwide pelt production efforts of chinchilla ranchers in 1963. In 1979, the major raw fur auctions were occurring in January, March, May, and December at CFC. By 1999, approximately 500 buyers would arrive in Copenhagen from 15 countries to bid on some 12 million mink pelts.

Kopenhagen Fur was the world's largest fur skin auction house and the centre of the international fur trade. When Copenhagen Fur Center ended its marketing alliance with Saga Furs of Scandinavia, the company made several changes. The fur center rebranded itself as Kopenhagen Fur to incorporate its geographic location but using the letter K as an unusual design feature. The company had been affected by the global economic downturn; pelt prices decreased by 30 per cent between 2008 and 2009 alone.

== See also ==
- Great Greenland Furhouse
