= SARS-CoV-2 in mink =

Both American mink and European mink have shown high susceptibility to the SARS-CoV-2 virus since the earliest stages of the COVID-19 pandemic, first in mink farms throughout Europe, followed by mink farms in the United States. Mortality has been extremely high among mink, with 35–55% of infected adult animals dying from COVID-19 in a study of farmed mink in the U.S. state of Utah.

In November 2020, in Denmark, the government mandated the culling of all of Denmark's 17 million mink at the time, due to reports that a mutated SARS-CoV-2 virus was being passed from mink to humans via mink farms, and that at least 12 human infections had been discovered in the North Jutland Region. While the State Serum Institute (SSI, Statens Serum Institut) suggested that this mutation was no more dangerous than other coronaviruses, SSI head Kåre Mølbak warned that the mutation could impact the development and effectiveness of COVID-19 vaccines.

The first known transmission of SARS-CoV-2 among wild mink was reported in Utah, which researchers believed was due to contact with infected captive mink rather than through an intermediary vector in the wild or direct human-to-mink transmission. Tracking the origin and spread of mink-related COVID variants has proven more difficult in the United States, where the reporting of outbreaks on mink farms has been voluntary, as opposed to the mandatory screening procedures introduced during outbreaks in Denmark and the Netherlands.

== Transmission ==
Due to the mink ACE2 receptor being a similar or better fit for SARS-CoV-2 compared to humans and the cramped living conditions of farm-raised animals, mink readily transmit SARS-CoV-2 to one another and develop symptoms of COVID-19. Additionally, Dutch researchers determined that the bedding materials and airborne dust on mink farms with outbreaks had also become highly contaminated.

== Mutations and variants ==
In Denmark, there have been five clusters of mink variants of SARS-CoV-2; the Danish State Serum Institute (SSI) has designated these as clusters 1–5 (Danish: cluster 1–5). In Cluster 5, also referred to as ΔFVI‑spike by the SSI, several different mutations in the spike protein of the virus have been confirmed. The specific mutations include 69–70deltaHV (a deletion of the histidine and valine residues at the 69th and 70th position in the protein), Y453F (a change from tyrosine to phenylalanine at position 453, inside the spike protein's receptor-binding domain), I692V (isoleucine to valine at position 692), M1229I (methionine to isoleucine at position 1229), and a non-conservative substitution S1147L.

In North America, a mink-human spillover event in Michigan, resulting in four human infections that were largely kept from public view upon their discovery late 2020, and only announced by the US Centers for Disease Control (CDC) in March 2021, was deemed ancestral to the Ontario WTD clade spillover event from white-tailed deer nearly a year later in Ontario, Canada. The Michigan spillback into humans was the first documented case of any animal spillback in the United States.

In late 2022, scientists continued to monitor residual Delta strains, such as Delta strain AY.103, which have picked up Omicron mutations during co-infection in mink and deer and form the potential for so-called "Deltacron" spillover events. These hybrid strains could potentially combine the increased fatality rate of Delta with the enhanced transmissibility of Omicron.

== See also ==
- List of animals that can get SARS-CoV-2
- COVID-19 pandemic and animals
- 2020 Danish mink cull
- Cluster 5
- Mink
