= SARS-CoV-2 in white-tailed deer =

Blood samples gathered by USDA researchers in 2021 showed that 40% of sampled white-tailed deer demonstrated evidence of SARS-CoV-2 antibodies, with the highest percentages in Michigan, at 67%, and Pennsylvania, at 44%. A later study by Penn State University and wildlife officials in Iowa showed that up to 80% of Iowa deer sampled from April 2020 through January 2021 had tested positive for active SARS-CoV-2 infection, rather than solely antibodies from prior infection. This data, confirmed by the National Veterinary Services Laboratory, alerted scientists to the possibility that white-tailed deer had become a natural reservoir for the coronavirus, serving as a potential "variant factory" for eventual retransmission back into humans.

In a March 2022 joint statement regarding animal monitoring, the World Health Organization (WHO), Food and Agriculture Organization (FAO), and World Organisation for Animal Health (OIE) specifically cited white-tailed deer as an example of a newly formed wild animal reservoir. An August 2023 study appeared to confirm this assertion, showing high SARS-CoV-2 deer positivity not only in urbanized areas but in rural counties with less likelihood of human-to-deer transmission. The same study also noted that SARS-CoV-2 evolves at an accelerated pace in white-tailed deer, at triple the rate of viral evolution in humans. White-tailed deer also maintain active infections much longer than humans, with infections lasting anywhere between six and nine months.

== Transmission ==
Infected deer can shed virus via nasal secretions and feces for 5–6 days and frequently engage in activities conductive to viral spread, such as sniffing food intermingled with waste, nuzzling noses, polygamy, and the sharing of salt licks. Similar to the course of infection in humans, SARS-CoV-2 develops and replicates within the upper respiratory tract of deer, with a particular focus on nasal structures. Infection was also noted within the tonsils, lymph nodes, and central nervous system tissue of deer.

Captive cervid facilities, where deer are kept in close proximity for breeding stock or for hunting, have showcased extremely high levels of transmission, with active infection levels exceeding 90% in one facility.

Although white-tailed deer possess a similar ACE2 receptor to humans that are at risk from SARS-CoV-2, European deer species, such as roe deer, red deer, and fallow deer, that likewise possess this cellular-level susceptibility had not showcased any cases of current or past infection during the first two years of the COVID-19 pandemic. European test data has suggested that the high density of white-tailed deer populations in North America and frequent human interactions are the unique factors which have led to outbreaks throughout the United States and Canada.

== Mutations and variants ==
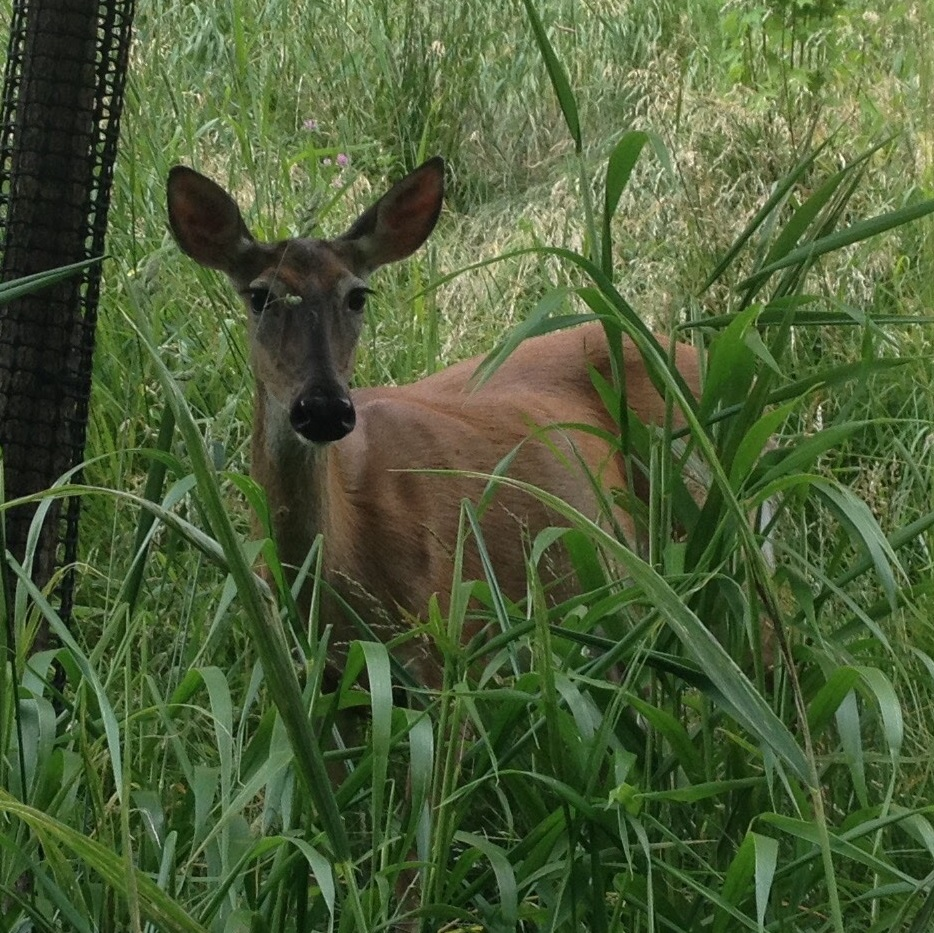
Female white-tailed deer near the campus of Cornell University, in Ithaca, New York

A 2021 Ohio State University study showed that humans had transmitted SARS-CoV-2 to white-tailed deer on at least six separate occasions and that the deer in their study possessed six mutations that were uncommon in humans at the time.

Test data from Pennsylvania showed that genomes from a divergent Alpha variant strain had been found within white-tailed deer in November 2021, long after it had ceased to be the dominant strain in humans. Further studies, in 2023, showed evidence of the Alpha variant in white-tailed deer more than a year after its most recent detection in local human populations. This, together with similar findings in New York State regarding both Alpha and Gamma strains, suggested that variants had continued to evolve independently in deer without the need for reinfection through direct or indirect human contact. These older variants, which had nearly disappeared in humans, were additionally shown to have genetically diverged more than the most recent human strains observed within wild deer populations, demonstrating that deer had supported SARS-CoV-2 lineages in a pathway significantly different from that of humans. Canadian researchers likewise observed the older Alpha and Delta variants among wild deer populations, while also describing a strain circulating among white-tailed deer that had only previously been observed among people in the United Kingdom.

A study of New York City's white-tailed deer population on Staten Island, commencing in December 2021, found that wild deer had already contracted the Omicron variant, which had just recently become prevalent in humans. One of the actively infected deer had high preexisting levels of antibodies, suggesting that deer can continually be reinfected with SARS-CoV-2. A Connecticut study, published in late 2025, found that reduced overall infections of wildlife, including among white-tailed deer, may have been due to the prevailing omicron strains becoming best suited to human hosts in comparison to earlier generalist strains.

=== Ontario WTD clade ===
In early 2022, Canadian researchers announced the discovery of a new SARS-CoV-2 variant within a November–December 2021 study of Ontario white-tailed deer, labeling it the "Ontario WTD clade". The new COVID variant also infected a person who had close contact with local deer, potentially marking the first instance of deer-to-human transmission. The last time that a relative of this viral clade had been seen was 10–12 months prior, within humans and mink, across the international border in Michigan. Researchers believed, after finding 76 mutations in WTD when compared to the original virus, that the variant arose within an intermediate animal host, a process which would have allowed it to accumulate such a high level of divergence.

The ancestral mink–human spillover event in Michigan also showed evidence of animal-to-human transmission, resulting in four human infections that were largely kept from public view upon their discovery late 2020, and only announced by the US Centers for Disease Control (CDC) several months later, in March 2021. The CDC defended its decision by noting that its findings were not "surprising or unexpected", since similar mink-to-human crossover events had already been documented in Europe. Two of the people infected by the Michigan mink strain had no known link to the mink farm, but had reported recent interactions with white-tailed deer while hunting on days that were on or near the onset of illness.

=== "Deltacron" strains ===
In late 2022, scientists continued to monitor residual Delta strains, such as Delta strain AY.103, which have picked up Omicron mutations during co-infection in mink and deer and form the potential for so-called "Deltacron" spillover events. These hybrid strains could potentially combine the increased fatality rate of Delta with the enhanced transmissibility of Omicron.

== Spillover/spillback cycles ==
While a November 2021 to April 2022 study uncovered 109 "independent spillover events" from humans into white-tailed deer, genomic analysis suggested 3 instances of double-spillover in which human SARS-CoV-2 strains spilled over into deer, spilled back into humans, and then subsequently spilled over into deer once again. Meanwhile, 18 samples could not be traced to any "genetically close" SARS-CoV-2 sequences circulating within humans in the states where white-tailed deer samples were gathered.

== Infection variability ==
A November 2021 to October 2022 USDA study across 29 states, which make up nearly the entire US range of white-tailed deer, showed widespread prior infection of deer across their US range, yet with decreased numbers of active infections as compared with measurements from the first two years of the pandemic. Researchers cautioned that lower active infections may have also been related to seasonal variability in infections at the time of sample collection and the cervid transmissibility rates of recent Omicron strains. The possibility of rapid seroconversion – the development of antibodies – in as little as one week post-infection suggested continued research into transmission pathways and methods to identify and manage disease spillover and spillback between humans and deer.

== Related species ==
Wildlife officials in Utah announced that a November–December 2021 field study had detected the first case of SARS-CoV-2 in mule deer. Several deer possessed apparent SARS-CoV-2 antibodies, however a female deer in Morgan County had an active Delta variant infection. White-tailed deer, which are able to mate and hybridize with mule deer, have migrated into Morgan County and other traditional mule deer habitats since at least the early 2000s. Canada also expanded testing to other cervids besides white-tailed deer, finding that both white-tailed deer and mule deer tested positive for the same variants circulating among the two species in the United States, whereas elk and moose did not exhibit exposure. Mule deer as far west as California had already been infected by 2021. As with white-tailed deer, a USDA study found that mule deer are also able to shed live SARS-CoV-2 virus and therefore possess a similar ability to infect other animals.

In a study published in 2023, free-ranging European fallow deer in Dublin, Ireland, were shown to be the first deer outside of North America to have contracted SARS-CoV-2.

== See also ==
- List of animals that can get SARS-CoV-2
- COVID-19 pandemic and animals
- White-tailed deer
- Natural reservoir
