= List of animals that can get SARS-CoV-2 =

Animals susceptible to disease

Dozens of captive animal species have been found infected or proven able to be experimentally infected with SARS-CoV-2, the virus that causes COVID-19. The virus has also been found in over a dozen wild animal species.

Most animal species that can get the virus have not been proven to be able to spread it back to humans. The Centers for Disease Control and Prevention has stated that there is low risk that the virus would spread from animals to people but further studies are yet to be conducted.

Animal	Date detected (or publicized)	Spread amongst themselves?	Spreads to humans?	Captive or wild infection?	References
Bank vole	April 2021	No		Captive	
Bat, Eastern red	(July 2024) (United States)			Wild	
Bat, Lesser horseshoe	(July 2021) (United Kingdom)			Wild	
Big hairy armadillo	March 2022			Captive	
Binturong	October 2021			Captive	
Black-tailed marmoset	January 2022			Wild	
Bobcat	November 2022			Wild	
Brown rat	(January 2023)			Wild	
Canada lynx	December 2021			Captive	
Cat	April 2020	Yes	Yes	Captive	
Cattle	(December 2020)			Captive	
Common marmoset	December 2020			Captive	
Civet					
Cottontail rabbit	November 2022	No		Wild	
Cougar/Mountain Lion/Puma	July 2020			Captive	
Crab-eating macaque	April 2020			Captive	
Dog	March 2020	No		Captive	
Domestic rabbit	October 2020	No		Captive	
Eastern deer mouse	June 2021	Yes		Captive and Wild	
Eastern gray squirrel	November 2022			Wild	
Eurasian Beaver	August 2021			Captive	
Eurasian lynx	November 2021			Captive	
European fallow deer	February 2022			Wild	
Ferret	April 2020	Yes		Captive	
Fishing cat	October 2021			Captive	
Fruit bat, Egyptian	September 2020	Yes		Captive	
Giant Anteater	(August 2022)			Captive	
Golden hamster	May 2020	Yes	Yes	Captive	
Gorilla	January 2021			Captive	
Groundhog	(July 2024)			Wild	
Hamadryas baboon	December 2020			Captive	
Hippopotamus	December 2021			Captive	
Indian leopard	October 2021			Wild	
Lion	October 2020			Captive	
Tiger	April 2020		Unconfirmed	Captive	
Mandrill	August 2022			Captive	
Mink Main article: SARS-CoV-2 in mink	October 2020	Yes	Yes	Captive and Wild	
Monkey, African green	September 2020			Captive	
Mouse, Western european house	(January 2022)			Captive (lab)	
Otter, Asian small-clawed	April 2021			Captive	
Pangolin (SARS-CoV2-Related Virus—as opposed to SARS-CoV2 specifically—antibodies detected; see "Wild or Captive infection" column)	February – July 2020 (Thailand)			Wild (Study concluded only that evidence of past infection with SARS-CoV2-Related Virus—as opposed to SARS-CoV2 specifically—was detected due to following findings: While Neutralizing Antibodies highly specific to SARS-CoV2 were found in small sample, it's highly plausible that the antibodies were cross-reacting antibodies to other SARS-CoV2-Related Virus(es); Tested negative for virus)	
Raccoon	November 2022			Wild	
Raccoon dog	December 2020	Yes		Captive	
Red fox	November 2022			Wild	
Rhesus macaque	May 2020			Captive	
Ring-tailed coati	October 2021			Captive	
Snow leopard	December 2020			Captive	
Spotted hyena	November 2021			Captive	
Squirrel monkey	July 2022			Captive	
Striped skunk	November 2022			Wild	
Swan	Summer 2022			Undisclosed	
Virginia opossum	November 2022			Wild	
West Indian manatee	(January 2022)			Captive	
White-footed mouse	November 2022			Wild	
White-tailed deer Main article: SARS-CoV-2 in white-tailed deer	December 2020	Yes	Yes	Captive and Wild	

== See also ==
- COVID-19 pandemic and animals
- SARS-CoV-2 in mink
- SARS-CoV-2 in white-tailed deer
