= Mink fur =

Type of fur

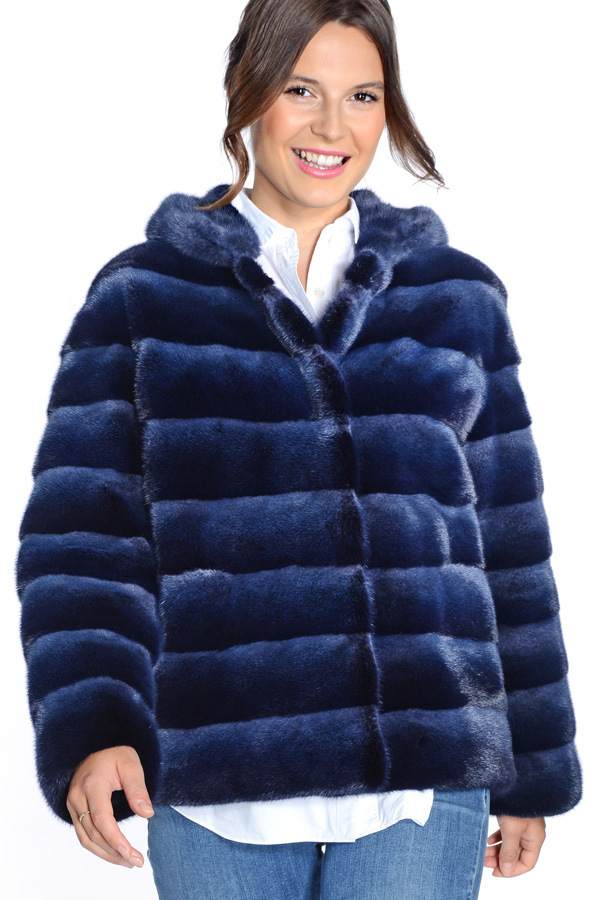
Indigo-dyed velvet mink jacket (Düsseldorf, 2019)

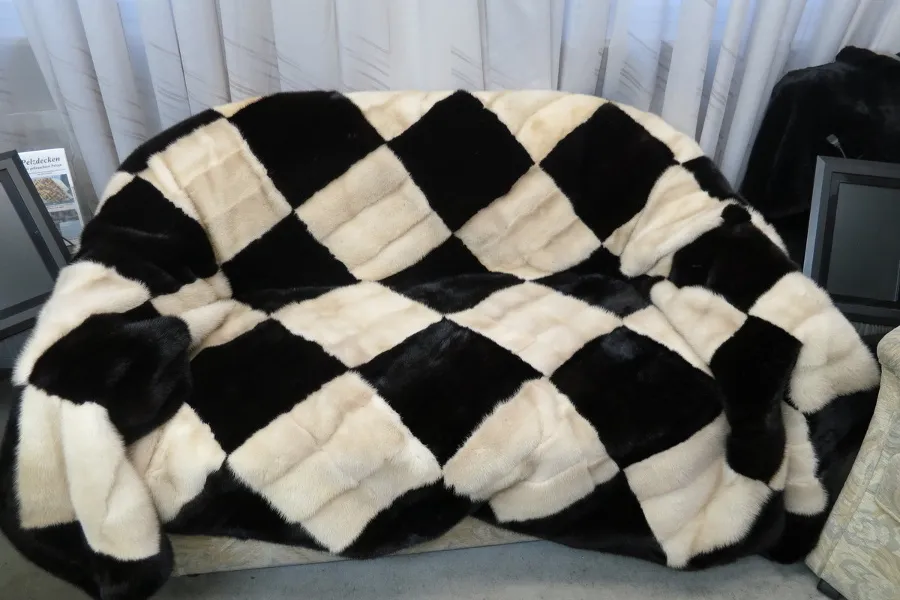
Blanket, redesigned from a dark mink and a pearl mink coat (Kaiserslautern, 2024)

Mink fur is a type of fur obtained from the mink and turned into a commodity.

In the fur trade today, mink fur refers to the fur of the offspring of the American mink, while the offspring of the European mink are strictly protected by federal species protection regulations. Animals taken from the wild may no longer be imported for trade. Wild mink furs traded in some countries generally continue to come from North America, although the mink has also become naturalized in Europe, especially in Eastern Europe.

The pelts of female minks are smaller, lighter, and have shorter hair than male pelts, which are about one-third larger.

In terms of durability, meaning resistance to wear and hide stability, mink is now considered the most rewarding fur material. In the past, otter fur, especially sea otter fur, was considered the most durable type of fur. Sheepskin, which is also very durable, is difficult to compare and is therefore not taken into account.

Since World War II, mink fur has dominated the international fur market and “left a very distinct mark on it.” Until around the end of the 20th century, mink was the fur most commonly imitated by other types of fur. These were traded under names such as mink-muskrat, mink-marmot, mink-weasel, etc.

== History of mink in fashion ==
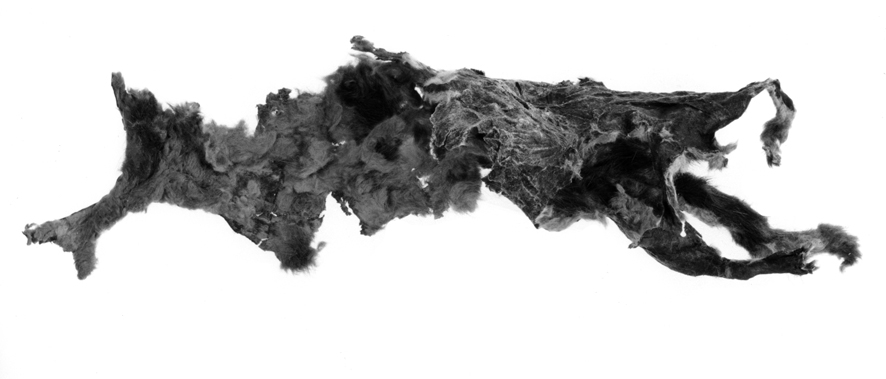
The oldest known mink pelt, 5th century, Austria

Little is known about the use of mink and their fur in early human history; there are no bone finds that could provide any clues, or at least none that have been definitively attributed to mink. The furs traded by German merchants as far as Smolensk in the 14th century also included minks. In 2002, a fully skinned mink pelt dating from the 5th century BC (Iron Age) was found in a salt mine on the Dürrnberg in Hallein (Salzburg province). Its origin was thought to be “possibly the steppe zones of Eurasia.” Since at least the Middle Ages, mink fur has been used mainly for fur linings and trimmings.

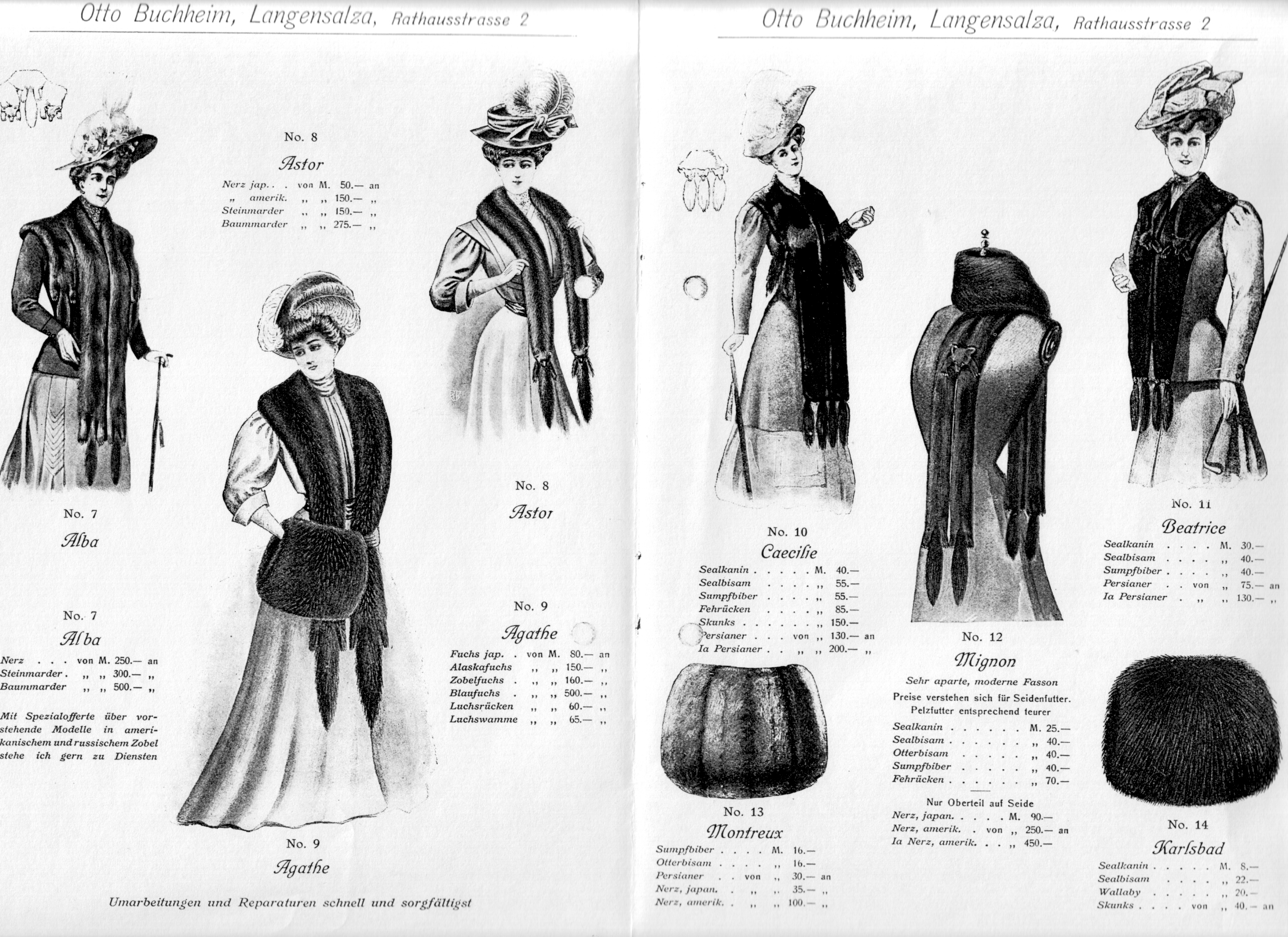
From the catalogue of the Buchheim company, Langensalza (1907)

In the late Middle Ages and especially during the Renaissance, fur scarves made from the skins of martens, known as zibellini, first appeared in fashion. It was probably only after this fashion had temporarily gone out of style, and presumably unjustly so, that they came to be called flea furs. It was assumed that the women who wore them had used them as flea traps. The fashion of these naturalized fur scarves, today known as fur chokers, reached its peak from the period before 1900 through the 1940s. However, they were still quite fashionable even after the Second World War. Whether the marten-like mink, alongside sable, pine marten, and stone marten, was already made into zibellini during the Renaissance is difficult to determine on the basis of old images. In modern times, however, mink took a leading position among the types of fur used for fur collars, alongside fox. Around 1900, clothing catalogues in Europe and America featured a considerable selection of scarves, collars, and muffs in all types of fur.

In 1682, the furriers of Schwäbisch Gmünd did not want to allow master furrier Melchior Beringer from Aalen to sell caps made of mink fur, at the annual fair alongside other fur products. After consulting with colleagues in the cities of Nuremberg, Nördlingen, Dinkelsbühl, and Esslingen, they had to admit that the Aalen furrier's behavior could not be prohibited.

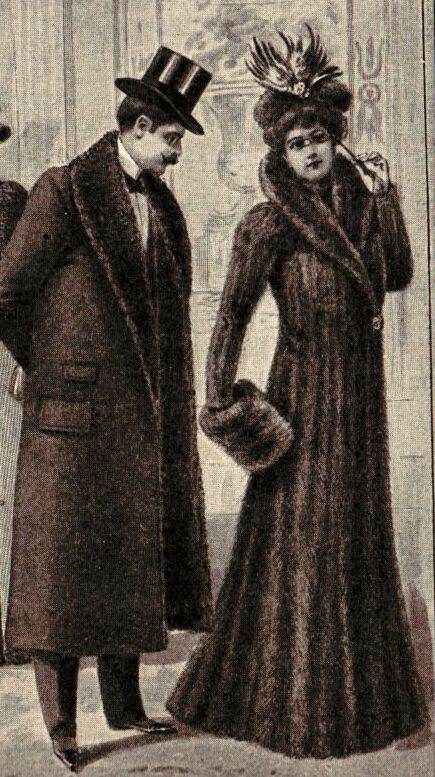
First applying of letting out technique to a coat length, World Exposition in Paris (Révillon Frêres company, Paris 1900)

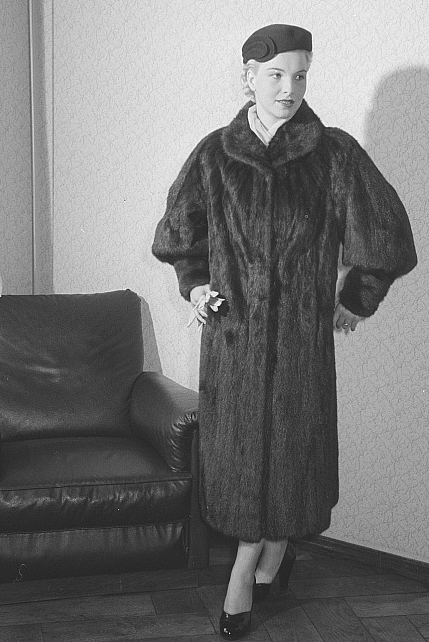
Dark mink coat (GDR, 1954)

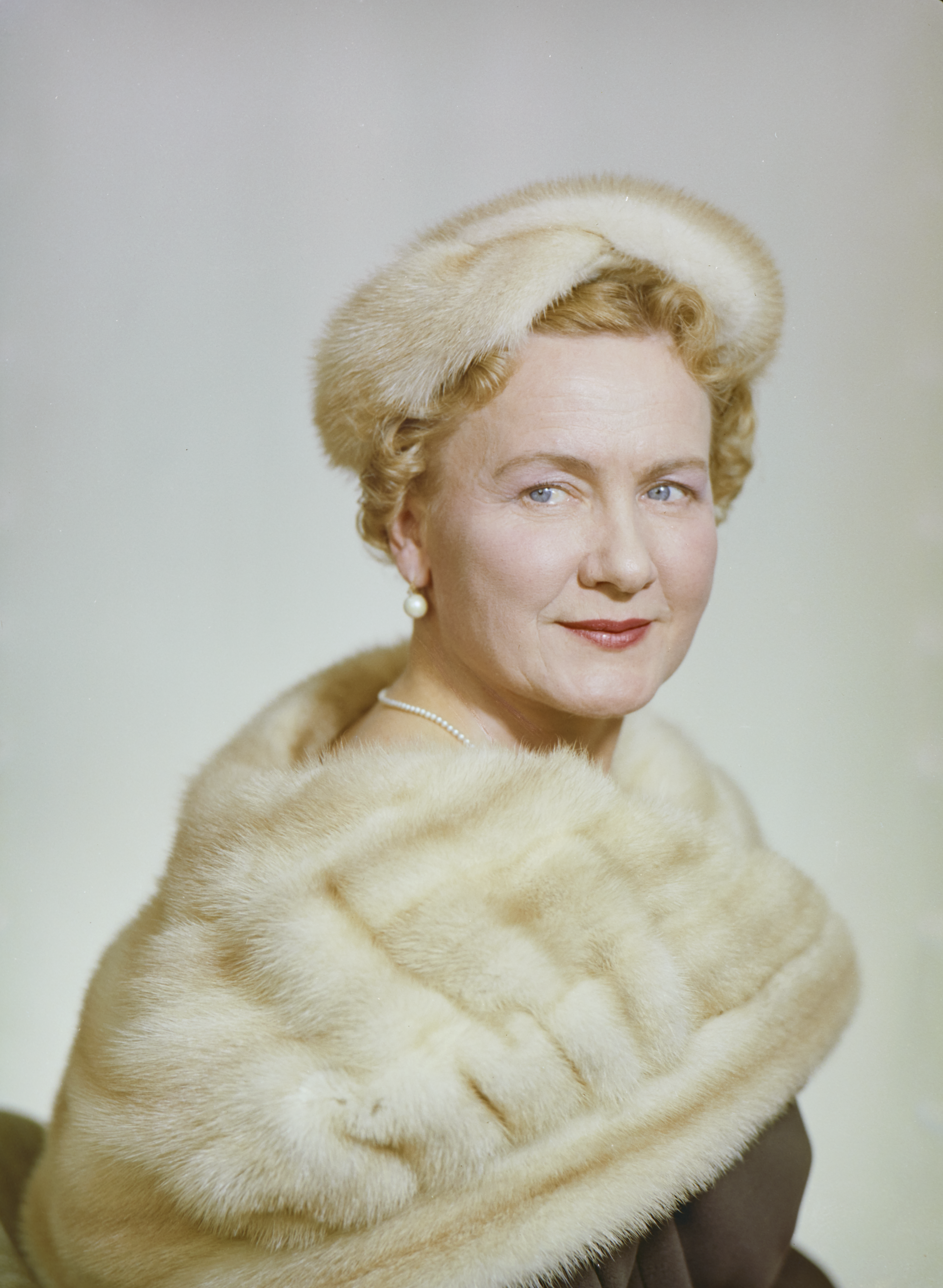
Mink stole with mink hat (Finland, 1959)

Its use for inner linings, collars, and trimmings since the Middle Ages can only be assumed; mink is explicitly mentioned for the period after 1830, a resurgence of men's fur coats, and for 1858 for trimmings on plush and velvet coats. However, as early as 1851, it was mentioned that North American mink pelts were being processed in immense numbers, mainly for women's clothing. The dominance of the mink jacket and mink coat in fur fashion over recent decades began around 1870, following the invention of the fur sewing machine. The Victoria and Albert Museum's collection includes a mink jacket, still made of wild mink, in a dolman cut, from the mid-1880s, when it was still unusual for fur to be worked with the hair facing outwards, except as trim. A dolman, half jacket, half cape, with wide sleeves, was a popular garment in the second half of the nineteenth century, and the cut of this mink coat is typical: hip-length with long sloping ends at the front and a shaped back. This unusual item is said to have been sold in London by furriers working for the Hudson's Bay Company.

It now became economically feasible to process mink pelts into narrow strips by means of letting-out. At the Paris World Exposition in 1900, Révillon Frères presented the first large-scale ready-made garments made from let-out mink, including a floor-length coat made from 164 Canadian mink pelts and one otter pelt. However, these pieces were still sewn entirely by hand, which for this coat alone required 1,400 hours of work by the seamstresses. The fur-sewing machines driven by foot pedals initially caught so much fur in the seams that they were not suitable for sewing the narrow strips, but were “usable only for coarser work, especially for the production of fur linings.”

In the first decade of the 20th century, the Native Americans of North America began regularly hunting mink, which today—coming largely from breeding—dominates high-end fur fashion. In the early 19th century, fur traders did buy mink pelts, but only to avoid upsetting their suppliers, and then set the pelts aside as undesirable. By the end of the 1920s, the American mink had become, at least in the United States, the principal fur featured in fashion shows.

In contrast to letting-out are full-pelt processing and half-pelt processing, in which the pelts are used largely unchanged, in their natural shape. The cost-effective transverse processing of pelts was developed in the 1920s. Apparently, however, it had not become widely established at the time; in 1961 a trade journal reported under the headline “Manufacturing process for mink coats 50% cheaper!” that with this supposedly new method only five weeks of labor were required to produce a coat instead of three. This announcement reportedly caused a considerable stir within professional circles. First-quality mink coats would now cost only £799 instead of £1,600, and lower-quality coats would cost as little as £485.

The basis for fur becoming more widely available to society was laid by the now advanced mink breeding industry, which by 1920 was able to supply large quantities of mink pelts. In 1945, farmed mink still didn't play a significant role in the global fur trade. By 1950, its share had already risen to 10%, from 1955 to 1960 to 25 to 30% and from 1965 to 1970 to over 70% of total fur sales. In the context of the postwar economic boom, the Federal Republic of Germany (West Germany) developed into the leading consumer country for furs starting in 1950. Although there were soon quite considerable mink farms in the GDR (East Germany), their pelts were exported as a source of foreign currency until the end, and there was no GDR mink fashion of its own.

Initially, Persian lamb was the main material used in West Germany, but with rising incomes in the 1970s, it was replaced by mink, which was an even higher status symbol. While Persian lamb still led the way in terms of numbers in 1969 in West Germany, based on fur import figures, it was now surpassed by mink in terms of value.

In her book “Pelze” (“Furs”), Marie Louise Steinbauer points out two specific circles of mink enthusiasts: “Such an ‘expensive-smelling’ white mink soon became part of the standard attire of a stripper with a reputation ... Thus the ‘priestesses of Venus,’ as they were poetically called in antiquity, like to protect themselves with warm furs. They have a particular fondness for fur jackets, or at least very short coats. As for the rest, they display the entire animal world: muskrat, nutria, karakul, rabbit, the successful ones mink.” For these women, the furs did not necessarily have to be new; the first second-hand fur shops emerged, and a used mink coat cost between 1,500 and 3,000 marks at a Hamburg auction house, plus a 15% fee.

After, twenty years later, nearly every German woman who wanted to and could afford it owned one or more mink jackets and coats, market saturation was reached as prices began to fall. For lower income groups, large quantities of clothing made from mink paws, heads, tails, and other parts were sold by specialist retailers, but above all by department stores and textile wholesalers. The aura of exclusivity as a symbol of regained prosperity was gone. Other types of fur had meanwhile pushed mink into the background, and a series of warm winters and protests by parts of the animal rights movement did the rest, causing fur sales in Germany to decline significantly. Despite historically high deliveries, the price of mink fur has risen so much due to strong demand from Russia and Asia that it is now rarely sold on the non-Russian European market (as of 2013).

In men’s fashion, mink made its appearance quite late and mostly half-heartedly. It can be assumed that since the Middle Ages it was always used to some extent—alongside other types of fur—for linings and trimmings among the upper social classes. In her history of men's fur, Italian author Anna Municchi mentions mink for the first time in 1952, when Brioni created the “Schelm”, a tuxedo with black mink trim. Other designers also began to take an interest in men's fur. With the trend toward unisex fashion, the full mink coat became increasingly acceptable, at least for fashion-conscious men. Jole Veneziani, “queen of the industry, who has spared no effort in women's fashion, deliberately uses only very discreet, exquisite, and moderate paletots for men's wardrobes: double-breasted coats made of dark saga mink, crafted from whole pelts.” At Dior, there was a Chesterfield coat made of American Lunaraine mink. Intentionally eye-catching was the performance of the American entertainer Liberace in a white, floor-length mink coat made with four flounces (frills). Despite this, men clearly preferred the more rustic types of fur, such as wolf, raccoon, or nutria. Among the classics that remain popular to this day are the mink blouson in the style of a pilot's jacket, the Russian ushanka earflap hat made of mink fur, and the coat lined with mink or velvet mink.

With the fur braiding technique developed before 1990, accessories made of mink and mink tails also became fashionable again after 2000. These included, among other items, scarves, fur stoles, and vests, which are characterized by a novel, flowing appearance similar to that of knitwear.

== European wild mink ==
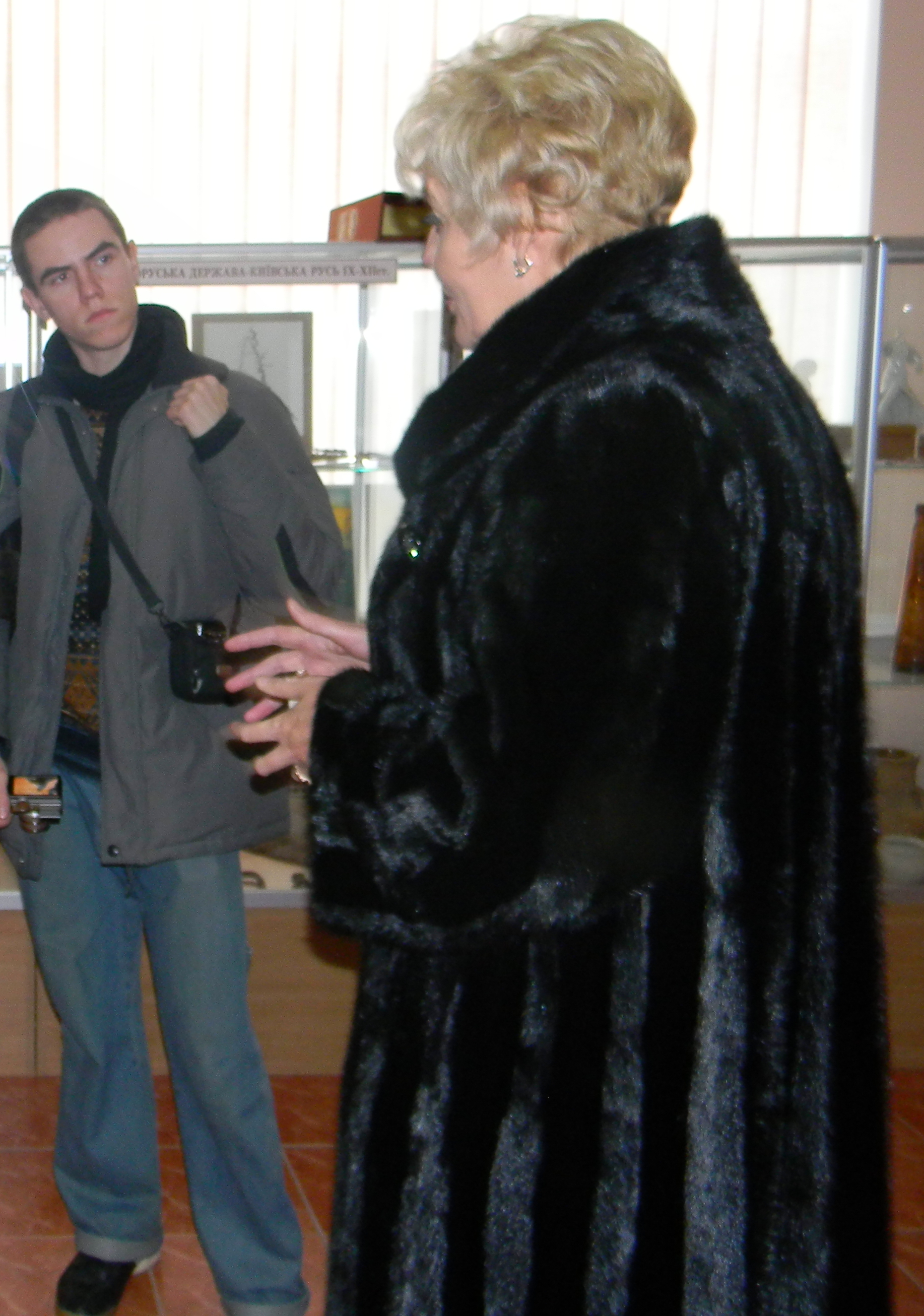
Black mink coat with an “up and down” finishing. Every second mink strip is treated using a letting-out technique, with the hair facing upwards (2011)

Once native to all of Europe, today the mink is found only in parts of Eastern Europe, and is listed as “endangered” by the IUCN. At least until 1988, fur was still being supplied from the Soviet Union and the river basin of the Danube Delta in Romania.

The fur length of the European wild mink is 35 to 40 centimeters (13.7 to 15.7 in), and the tail is 12 to 16 centimeters (4.7 to 6.3 in) long. The Caucasian wild mink is the only subspecies that reaches a length of 38 to 44 centimeters (15 to 17.3 in) and a tail length of 16 to 20 centimeters (6.3 to 7.9 in). A distinctive feature is the white upper lip, which its American relative lacks, and occasionally, like the American mink, it has white spots on its throat and chest. The fur coloration is always very dark, almost black (“generally darker than wild American minks”), and the undercoat and upper hair are often somewhat coarse and stiff, so that even around 1900 they were considered significantly less valuable than American mink. The pelts from Western Siberia have a slightly fuller undercoat and denser hair, but they do not match the quality of the American mink.

Populations in the Altai Mountains have a guard hair length of about 17 millimeters (0.66 in) on their backs in summer and wool hair of just under 10 millimeters (0.4 in). There are an average of 17,450 hairs per square centimeter. There are 16 to 22 wool hairs per guard hair.

- The Russian fur standard distinguishes between Western, Northern, Central, and Caucasian furs according to origin, and between grades I, II, and III according to quality. The first grade consists of white-coated winter pelts, called “Ledjanka” (from ljod = ice). The second grade includes blue-coated pelts with a less bushy tail. The third grade, also blue-coated but with a sparse tail, is called “Snopowka” (from snop = sheaf of ears).
- European types (Scandinavia, etc.) are sorted into dark brown, brown, and light brown; deliveries were described as insignificant in 1988.

Around the beginning of the 1940s, approximately 30,000 to 40,000 European wild mink pelts entered the market. By about 1940, these deliveries at Russian auctions had increased to as many as 70,000 to 75,000 pieces. Of these, 15% came from Karelia, 4% from the Ural region, 20% from Western Siberia, 25% from Central Russia, 10% from Ukraine, and 15% from the North Caucasus.

In addition, American (wild) minks were successfully introduced in some regions of Europe and Asia, for example in Sweden, Norway, Finland, Karelia, the central Ural region, the Altai, the Far East, and other parts of Russia; others escaped from breeding farms. As early as 1961, an estimated 18,000 wild mink were caught in Sweden alone as a result of intensive hunting.

== American wild mink ==
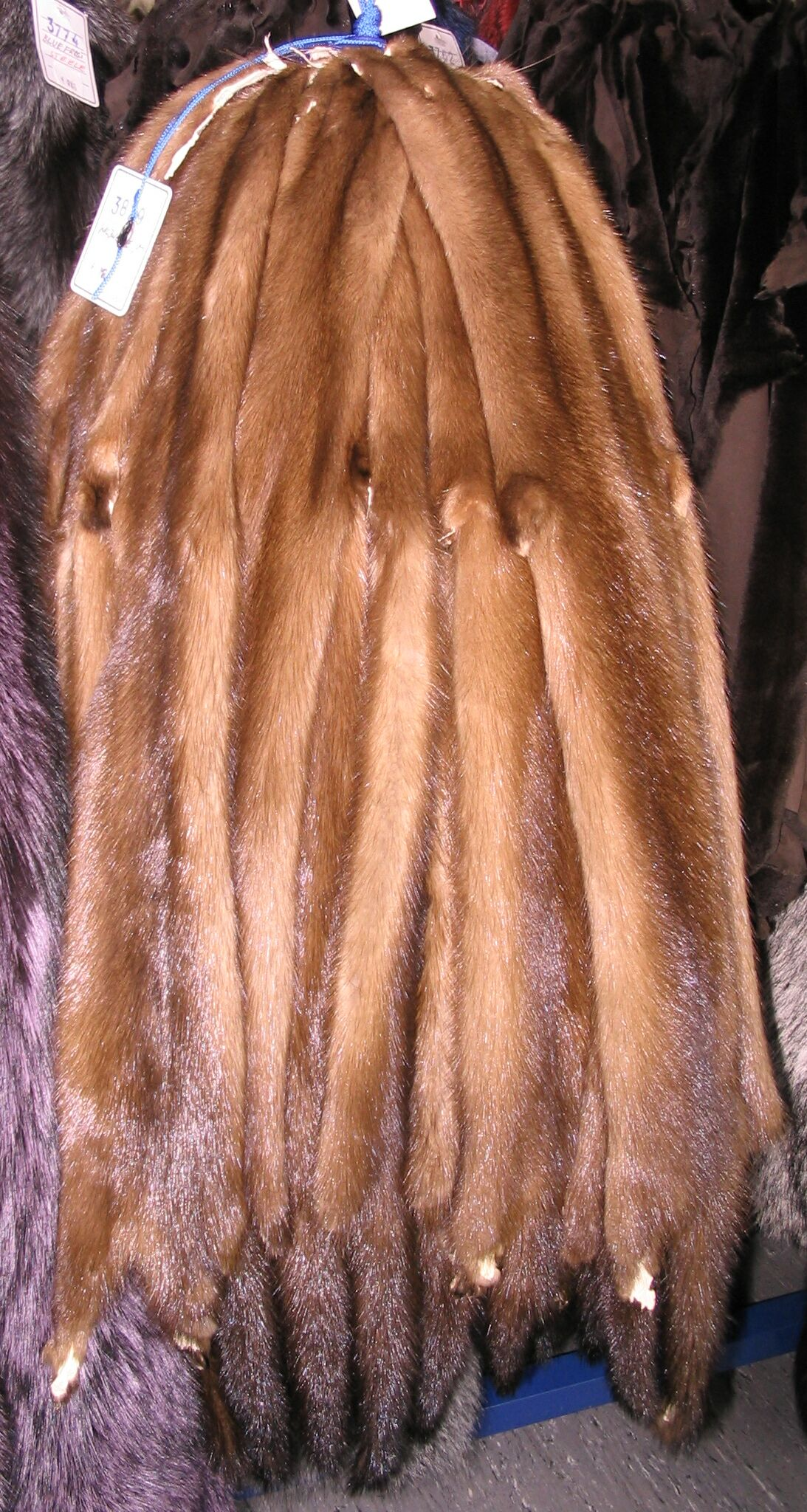
North American wild mink pelts

The fur of the American mink is considerably larger than that of the European mink. It does not have a white upper lip; however, in the wild form it usually has light to white throat and chest markings, which are rare in the European mink. In its large range, which in North America extends from the Arctic Circle to the Gulf of Mexico, the mink forms a number of subspecies that differ significantly in size, physique, and coat structure. For example, while minks with a body length of 70 to 80 centimeters (27.5 to 31.5 in) live in the Yukon River basin, the Canadian subspecies only reach a length of 30 to 40 centimeters (11.8 to 15.7 in). The coloration varies from a very dark, almost black brown to a “clay-colored” tone. The summer coat has shorter hair and is less dense and less shiny than the winter coat.

The further south the fur comes from, the lighter it is. In addition, the hair becomes flatter and the fur less dense. Pelts from inland areas are silkier, darker, and shorter-haired than those from animals near the coast. Canadian types have lighter hide, while southern ones are heavier. Eastern Canadian pelts are the best, with the possible exception of a small number obtained from the northern part of the state of Maine. The closer the hunting areas extend toward the Rocky Mountains, the larger the pelts become, but the hair quality is poorer and the coloration is worse. In the western regions beyond the Rocky Mountains, along the Pacific Coast, there lives a very short-haired but large type, some specimens of which have quite good coloration. The most typical examples of this type come from British Columbia and Alaska. The closer the hunting areas are to the West Coast, the less intense the coloration of the pelts becomes.

The pelts from the United States differ far more from one another than those from Canada. From the northeastern U.S. comes a type that is quite similar to good eastern Canadian pelts. The farther east and south the origin, the shaggier and poorer in color the pelts become. In the South, extending into the states of Minnesota, North Dakota, South Dakota, and Nebraska, one finds the type known collectively as North-Western. It is usually very large, has long, coarse guard hairs, and the undercoat is also very coarse. In general, the pelts become coarser and coarser the further one penetrates southward through the central states of the USA.

More pelts come from the central southern states of the US, mainly Minnesota, than from any other state. This Southern or Salt Walter type is slightly smaller than the mid-continental type, but is still of good size. The color variations range from reddish brown through yellowish to an almost orange tone. An exception are the pelts from the French Settlement around Lake Maurepas east of the Mississippi. The pelts from this freshwater marshland are often so dark here that they are confused with those from the northern regions.

The flatlands of the USA produce very shaggy, long-haired pelts, while along the Pacific Coast, wild minks similar to those found on the western Canadian coast are caught.

The Hudson's Bay Company, founded in 1670, divided Canada into 16 regions and described the type of fur found in each of these areas. Records from 1777 identify eleven different North American mink “races”; ultimately, in 1930, five were specified as subspecies of the American mink.

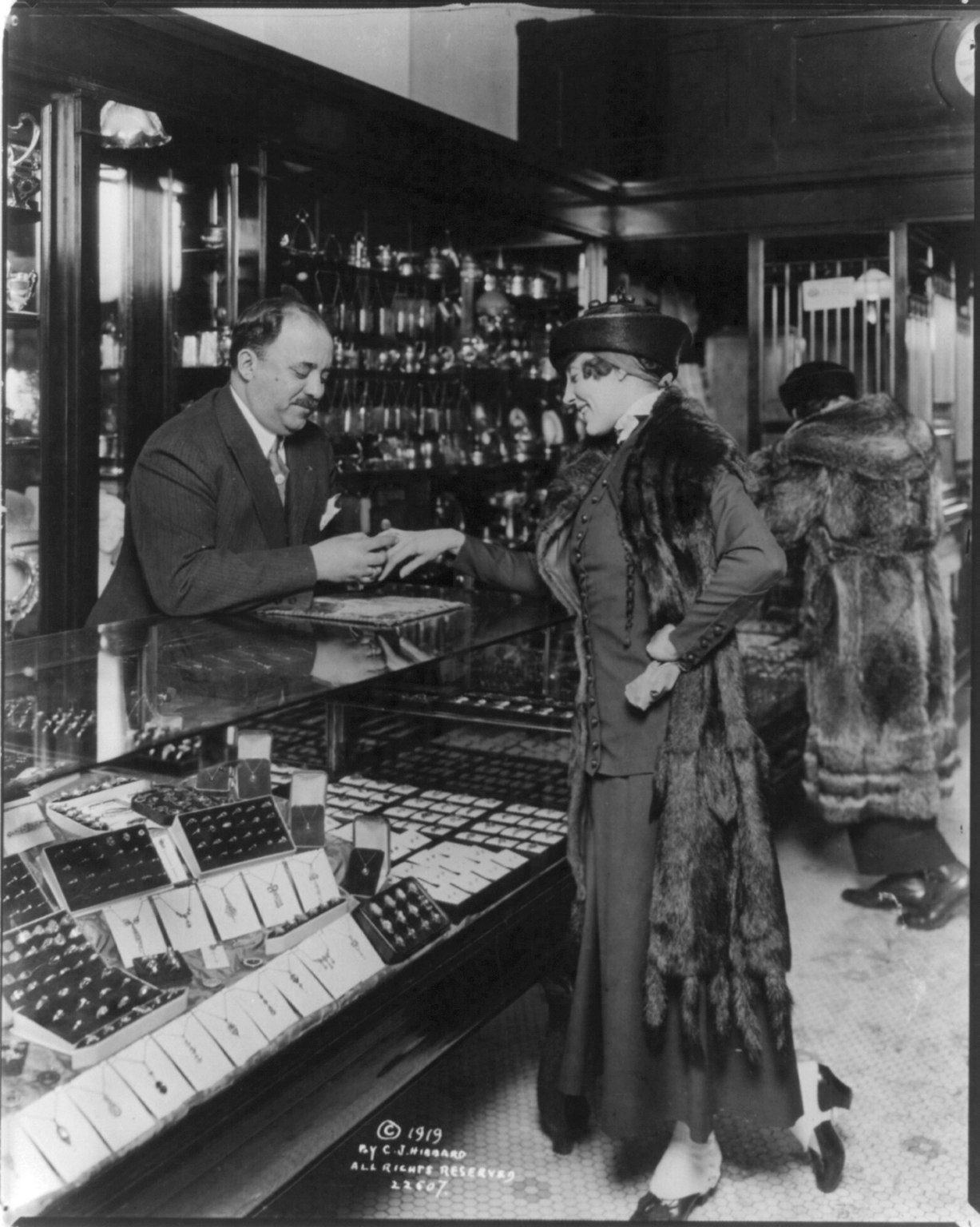
Mink stole (USA, 1919)

The trade distinguishes between Ones, Twos, Threes, and Fours in its quality assessment, with hair texture being the decisive criterion. Ones have well-developed hair, the guard hair covers the undercoat well, and the pelt is fully haired and has a good sheen. Twos often have bluish hide and usually come from the beginning of spring. After dressing, (Note: The initial stage of preparing raw pelts, where the fur is cleaned, softened, and stretched.) these pelts often lack elasticity in hides, and during the tanning process the hair frequently becomes bent at the tips. Threes are generally no longer usable; these are pelts from early autumn or from late early spring. The hair, especially the undercoat, is overall poorly developed. Fours are pelts from early summer or from diseased animals.

Dividing into categories usually takes place only after the pelts have been dressed. They are then packed loosely in crates and sent to the fur market in batches. A distinction is then made between dark; brown; dark brown; technically “blue”; light; and technically “red”.

By origin:

Northeast (Canada)

- Labrador: Very dense, finest varieties. Small to medium-sized; finely silky to deep dark blue-black.
- Nova Scotia (Halifax): Similar in fineness to Labrador one, but smaller.
- York Fort (around Alberta, Saskatchewan, Manitoba): Medium-sized; finely silky; very dark, almost blue-black.
- Mackenzie River: Large, delicately colored, bluish-blonde pelts with silky, short hair.

Northwest (USA)

- Alaska: Very large, larger than other varieties. Less silky, robust; mostly dark. Good pelts come from the Kenai Peninsula district. Mostly delivered with the hair facing outwards.
- Yukon: Even larger; finely silky; very dark, almost blue-black. It is referred to as “the giant.” Its hair structure is considered one of the finest origins.
- “Kuskokwim,” a natural pastel-colored mink, comes from the lake-rich tundra region of central Alaska. Because of the size and density of its pelt, it was introduced into breeding, “after only a few specimens had been captured alive a few decades ago (by 1988).”

West

- Southern Alaska, Lower California: Large; less silky; medium brown.

Central States (Centrals)

- Minnesota and North Dakota: Particularly large; coarsely silky; medium brown to dark black. In parts of the Central Western region, so-called “cottons” occur, with light, sparsely covered undercoat.

Southern States

- Carolina: shaggy; somewhat darker; less heavy in the hide; but smaller; coarser, more bristly hair.
- Louisiana: Medium-sized; less fine-haired; medium-colored.
- Mississippi Delta: coarser; very light, yellowish to brownish; lightweight quality. These pelts are considered the lowest quality and are referred to as “fish mink.”
- Florida, Georgia, Alabama: very flat, thin-haired, “clay-colored”.

Eastern States

- North Carolina, Georgia, Pennsylvania: less fine-haired, but rather dark. Some of the pelts are larger and coarser in hair.

Assortments:

Hudson's Bay Company and Annings Ltd., London, sort according to:

- Origin: YF (York Fort), MKR (Mackenzie River), WA (Western Arctic), EB (Eskimo Bay), MR (Moose River) East, MR West, LS (Upper Lake) & CANA (Canada), LS & MR, NW Coast, Alaska, USA
- Grades: I, I & 2, II, III, IV, damaged, specimen.

In 1987, the Hudson's Bay Company introduced pelts under the quality designation “Ultra” for the farmers still associated with it.

- Colors: extra-extra dark, extra dark, dark, medium, pale, part pale.

Unlike farmed minks, wild minks do not have brownish undercoats, but rather bluish ones.

As mentioned, in wild mink the size of the pelt and the quality of the hair are closely related. Regarding size by origin, it can be summarized roughly as follows: the smallest come from the group of eastern wild minks, and they increase in size the further they come from the southern regions. The opposite is true for the central North American type. Here, the largest mink comes from the Great Lakes region, and it decreases in size the further south it originates. The largest pelts from the eastern regions are no larger than the medium-sized ones of the central North American mink.

The pelts are usually delivered in a round shape, with the hair facing inwards. They are traded in their raw state on the open market and at auctions.

The durability coefficient for silky pelts, including Canadian ones, is 50 to 60%, and for coarser pelts 60 to 70%. (Note: The comparative values (coefficients) given are the result of comparative testing by furriers and fur traders with regard to the degree of apparent wear (usage). The numbers are not unambiguous; in addition to subjective observations of durability in practice, each individual case is influenced by tanning and finishing as well as numerous other factors. A more precise figure could only be determined on a scientific basis. The classification was made in steps of 10 percent each. The most durable fur types based on practical experience were set at 100 percent.) An English furrier went even further in his assessment as early as 1913; he wrote about wild mink: “They wear extremely well; in fact, they are among the most durable furs I know.” When fur animals are divided into the fineness categories, among which are silky, fine, medium-fine, coarser and hard, the hair of the Russian mink and that from the southern United States is rated as medium-fine, with that of the “fish mink” from the southern USA in particular classified as coarser. Farmed mink is not mentioned in this listing.

An American statistic estimated the number of wild mink pelts obtained from the US and Canada in 1974/75 at approximately 350,000. By comparison, the Soviet Union obtained 30,000 pelts in the 1973/74 season, none of which were exported. In subsequent years, the North American gaining fluctuated between 300,000 and 400,000 pelts, with just under a third of these coming from Canada.

Furthermore, pelts from introduced populations and from minks that have escaped from farms are now found in Europe and Asia. American wild minks were introduced, among other places, in Russia and the Far East (1939, in the Ussuri–Amur region). Pelts from animals that escaped from farms are offered from Sweden as well. There is also now a substantial population in Central Europe. However, hunting in Germany hardly takes place. The reasons are the temporarily low pelt prices and legal hunting restrictions. The most important buyer of German wild mink receives at most 50 pelts per year, mostly of low, poorly colored quality, which are mainly dyed black and then processed into trimmings (2010).

Large types are often made into small items such as trimmings and scarves, and formerly also into stoles, while medium-sized types with light pelts are used for jackets and coats. Whereas wild mink pelts of selected quality were once considered particularly exquisite, interest in them in Germany has been low in recent decades (2010).

The best colorations come from the north, around 45° north latitude. The medium coloration types originate from the region between the 45th and 50th parallels; they have a brownish coloration. Southwards from the 35th parallel, a reddish-brown type is found.

Place of origin	XL*	Large*	Medium*	Small*	Color	Hair
Eastern	28	26	22	20	dark blue brown	silky
Ontario	30	27	24	22	blue brown	silky
Northern Canada	33	28	25	22	blue brown	silky
Carolina	30	25	22	20	dark brown	medium-coarse
Minnesota	34	29	25	23	brown	coarse
Iowa	31	27	24	22	medium brown	coarse
Central	30	26	24	22	light brown	very coarse
Louisiana	30	26	24	22	reddish brown	very coarse
Coast and British Columbia	32	28	26	23	dull brown	silky and thin
* All measurements are given in inches.

=== Sea mink ===
Little is known about the sea mink, which became extinct in the 19th century due to excessive hunting. It lived along the North American Atlantic Coast; the last specimen is said to have been killed in New Brunswick in 1894.

It was similar to the closely related American mink but was significantly larger. The head-and-body length is estimated at 66 centimeters (26 in), with an additional tail length of around 25 centimeters (10 in). The fur was coarser and more reddish than that of the American mink.

== Farmed mink ==
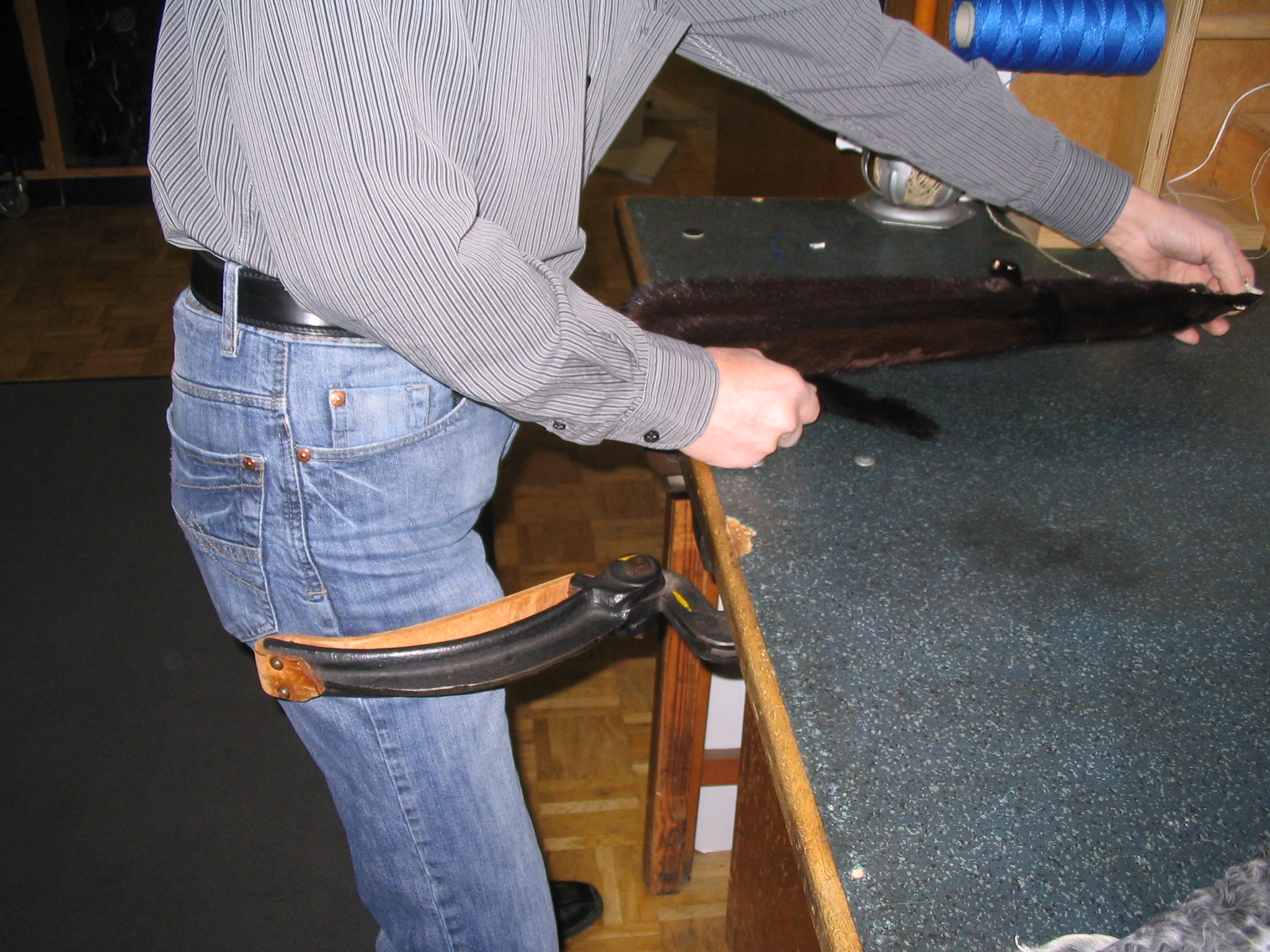
At the furrier: a mink pelt being stretched (2012)

The breeding of the American mink began in North America before 1900 and had already reached a considerable scale by 1920. Around this time, the first farmed animals were also sold to Europe. However, up until the end of the Second World War, it did not reach the scale of silver fox breeding. By that point, the fashion for long-haired furs had declined, and mink began to dominate fur fashion.

The first mink coat made from German-bred mink was produced in 1931. The women's coat was made from 105 pelts from the Fürstenried mink farm in Unterdill near Munich. It was manufactured by the Munich company Bernhard Bauch, where the coat was displayed for some time in the shop window together with live animals before being sold to Paris.

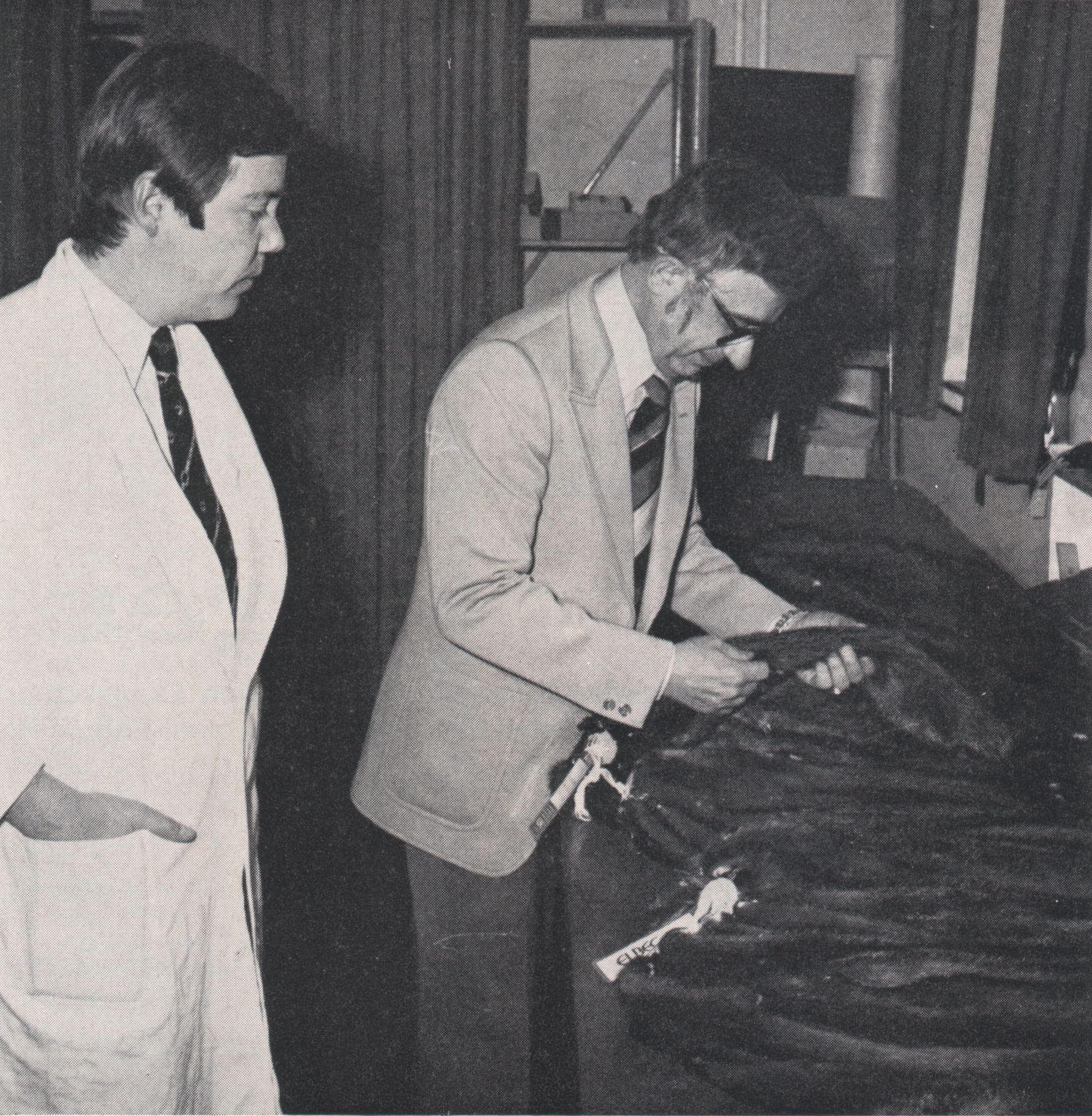
Evaluation of the new long-haired mink type “Sa Belle” (1975)

American breeding programs for long-haired fur types (begun around 1950), such as SAMI mink (1958, portmanteau of sable and mink), whose guard hairs were two and a half to three times as long and whose underfur was twice as long as that of the known farmed and wild mink or KOJAH (bred by C. Piampiano, Zion, Illinois; also sable-like and first offered in 1968 with about 5,000 pelts), were unable to establish themselves on the market despite initially achieving record prices. There were successful attempts to cross them with mutation minks; however, there is not much known about any long-term commercialization of the breeding results—marketed under the name “Sa Belle,” first offered in Germany in 1975 and described as improved, with a fluffy undercoat and fewer guard hairs.

In 1974/75, global production of farmed mink pelts amounted to just under 24 million, of which 12 million were standard minks. Under this name, the naturally brown-colored farmed minks are traded. The term originally emerged a few years after the Second World War, primarily to distinguish them from wild minks. As increasingly darker-colored minks were bred, the more descriptive designations “dark mink” and “black mink” gradually came into use instead.

The specialist literature does not provide a separate durability coefficient specifically for farmed mink. It can be assumed that the durability of today's highest-quality pelts is significantly higher than that of the American wild mink, approaching the 100% assumed for sea otter.

=== Coloration and other distinctions ===
The throat spots characteristic of the American mink has, through selective breeding, usually disappeared completely; nowadays, even a small remnant spot is almost never present. Typical of the mustelid family are the white guard hairs and tufts of white undercoat that are present to varying degrees in different pelts and distributed over the entire coat. In standard mink, the white guard hairs were considered a hallmark of a pelt left in its natural color. Such minks still occur, but as a rule they now show hardly any white hairs (2010).

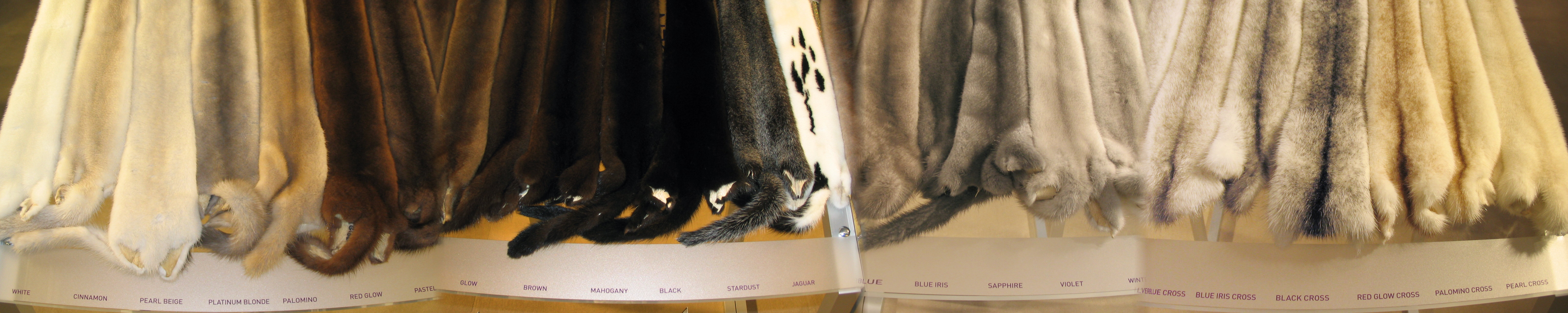
Scandinavian breeding mink colors (2008)

In fur farming, color mutations have repeatedly occurred, of which about twenty to thirty colors, shades, or patterns achieving a significant market share. Depending on supply and demand, this number is subject to constant change. After as early as 1988 the number of variants produced through systematic selection and crossbreeding of color types was estimated at just under two hundred, it is likely that the number has since risen well beyond that.

The breeding of mutation colors in mink gave mutation breeding its first significance in the fur industry; until then, efforts had been made to breed the purest possible type of mink. The result was the standard mink. The first mink mutation became known in Canada in 1929. When a new, visually appealing color comes onto the market, it only becomes commercially interesting once a quantity of about 5,000 pelts is available. In the first years, these assortments usually achieved exceptionally high prices. By 1950, the US, which had always been the leader in mutation mink breeding, supplied only 30% of the pelts in the classic dark-brown standard color, while Canada supplied 40%.

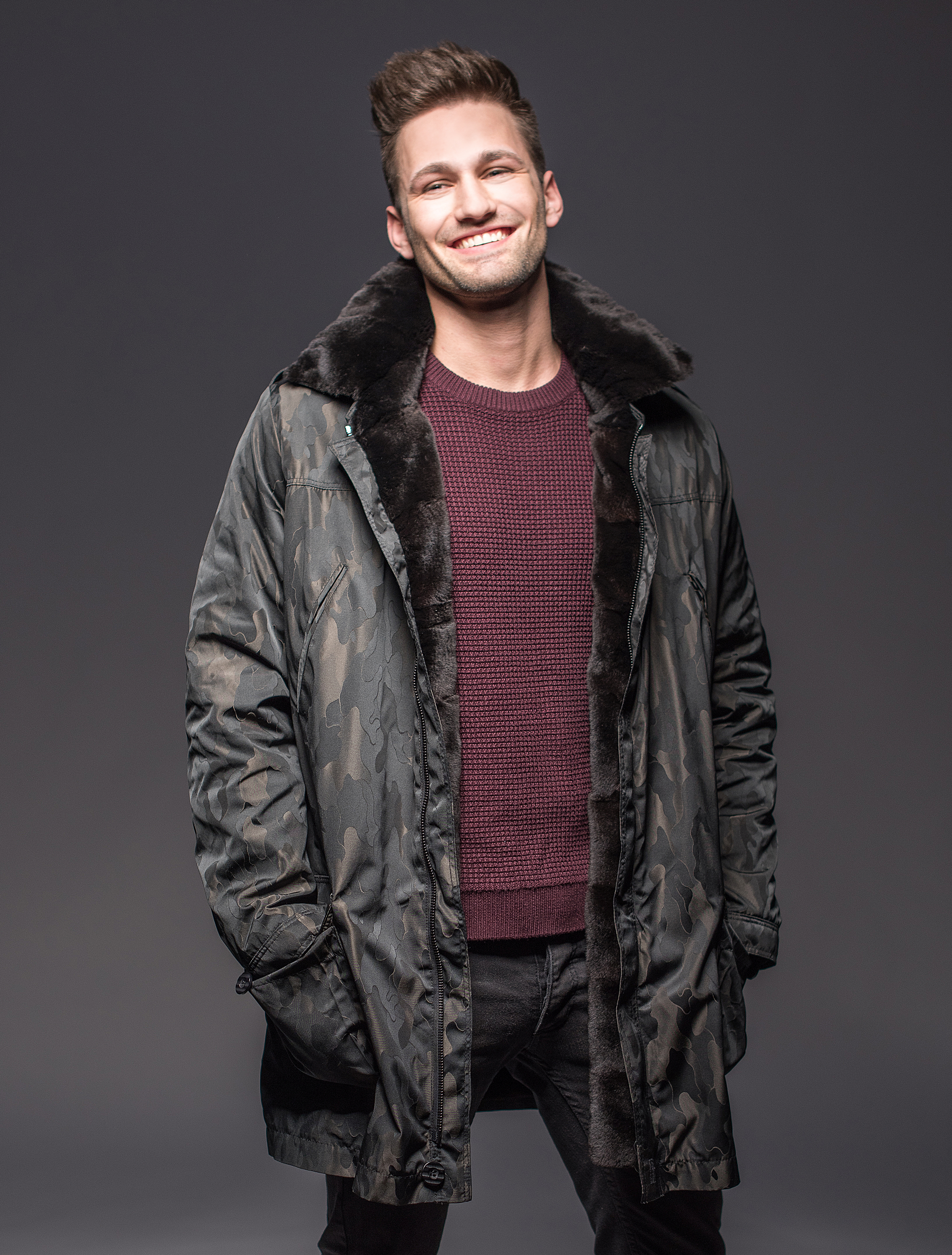
Men's jacket with velvet mink lining (Bern, 2016)

For German mink breeders and furriers, the biggest surprise after the Second World War was the extent and importance that mutation mink breeding had attained. At a London May auction in 1957, more mutation pelts than standard pelts were offered for the first time; two years later, the supply had roughly balanced out.

The first coat made from silverblue or platinum mink was sold at a New York charity event for the then record price of $18,000. This blue-gray color was the first mutation color whose further breeding was carried out systematically on the farm of W. Whittingham in Wisconsin. The first known mink mutation occurred in Canada; however, due to the association regulations in force at the time regarding purebred—meaning brown—animals, the animal was culled.

Another early mutation was the Aleutian mink with a steel-blue coloration. Both colors, Platinum and Aleutian, came from litters whose parents were wild-caught animals. From crossing the Aleutian mink with the Platinum mink, the blue-gray Sapphire mink was produced; the proceeds from the first such coat amounted to $36,000, and the second coat was given to Evita Perón, the wife of Argentina's President Juan Perón.

The mutation that appeared in 1943 on a Canadian farm, with a yellowish-brown coloration and a slight bluish sheen, was referred to as Pastel mink. The pastel color was very successful for many years until it lost importance due to the breeding of darker color shades.

The four colors mentioned above were the first of the traded mutation minks.

In 1947, the cream-colored palomino mink appeared in Karleby, Finland. Almost at the same time, a similar coloration emerged in the United States.

The color violet was announced in 1958 as a new mutation from the group of “Azurènes” by the breeders’ association Emba, with 1,000 pelts intended for sale in the following year.
