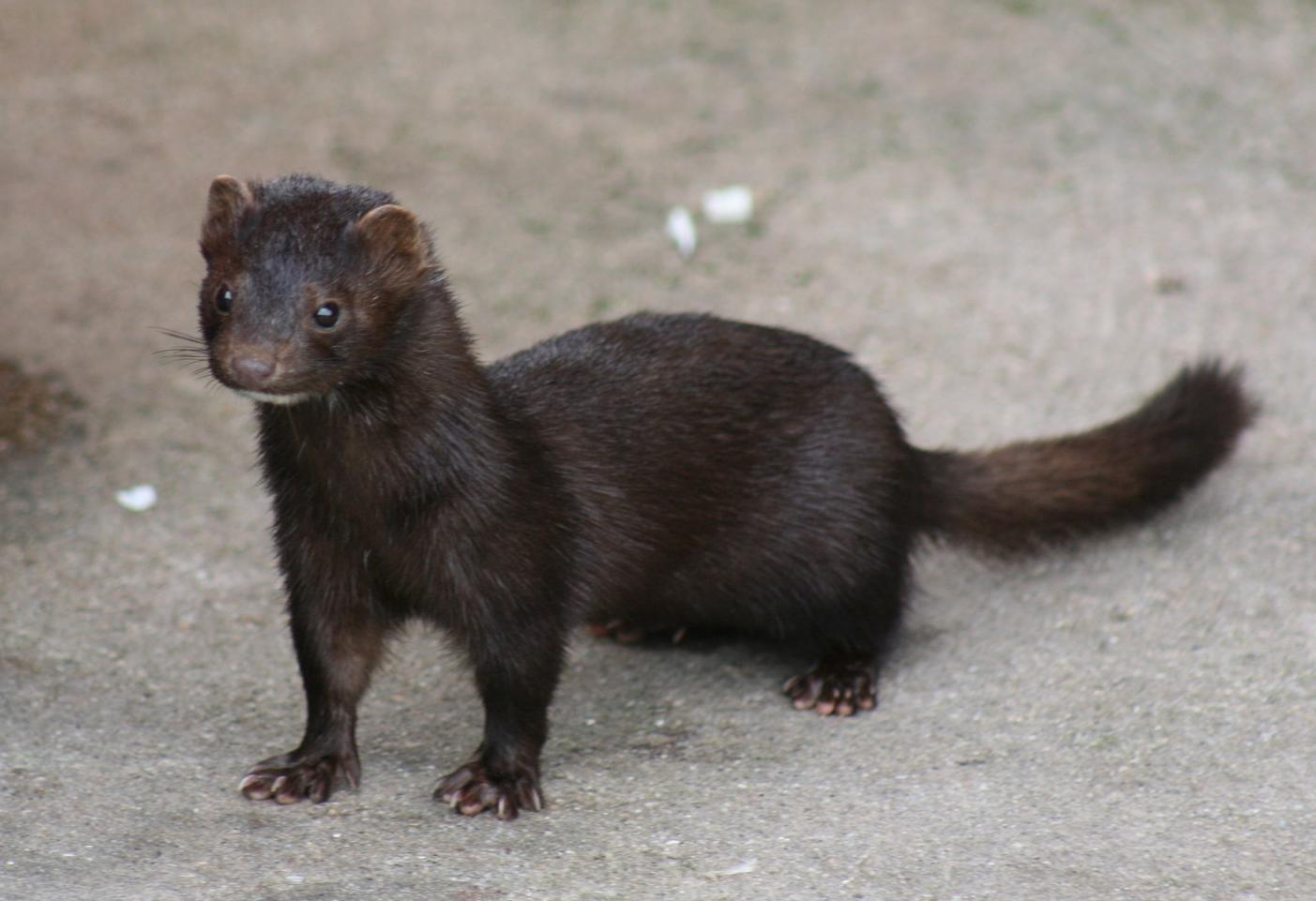
- American mink (Neogale vison)

Scientific classification
- Kingdom: Animalia
- Phylum: Chordata
- Class: Mammalia
- Order: Carnivora
- Family: Mustelidae
- Subfamily: Mustelinae

Species included
- Mustela lutreola; Neogale vison; †Neogale macrodon

= Mink =

Mammal in the family Mustelidae

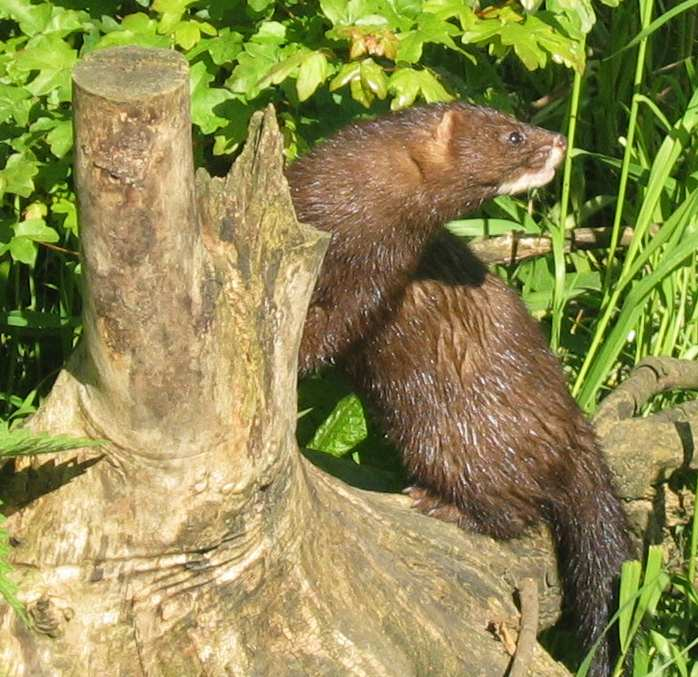
European mink (Mustela lutreola)

Mink are dark-coloured, semiaquatic, carnivorous mammals in the genera Mustela and Neogale and part of the family Mustelidae, which also includes weasels, stoats, martens, otters, badgers, and others. There are two extant species referred to as "mink", the American mink and the European mink. The extinct sea mink was related to the American mink but was much larger.

The American mink's fur has been highly prized for use in clothing. Their treatment on fur farms has been a focus of animal rights and animal welfare activism. American mink have established feral populations in Europe (including Great Britain and Denmark) and South America. In some cases this happened after the animals were released from mink farms by animal rights activists, in others, mink escaped from captivity by themselves. In the UK, under the Wildlife and Countryside Act 1981, it is illegal to release mink into the wild. In some countries, any live mink caught in traps must be humanely killed.

American mink are believed by some to have contributed to the decline of the less hardy European mink through competition (though not through hybridisation; European mink are more closely related to polecats than to North American mink). Trapping is used to control or eliminate introduced American mink populations.

Mink oil is used in some medical products and cosmetics, as well as to treat, preserve, and waterproof leather.

As mink can become infected with multiple viruses and can transmit diseases to humans and other animals, mink farming, with feed from possibly infected animal sources, has the potential to allow viruses to combine to produce lethal variants transmissible between humans, which can lead to a devastating pandemic.

== Species ==
The American mink (Neogale vison) is larger and more adaptable than the European mink (Mustela lutreola) but, due to variations in size, an individual mink usually cannot be determined as European or American with certainty without looking at the skeleton. However, all European mink have a large white patch on their upper lip, whereas only some American mink have this marking. Therefore, any mink without the patch is certainly of the American species. Taxonomically, both American and European mink were placed in the same genus Mustela but the American mink was reclassified as belonging to its own genus, Neovison, though it has recently been reclassified alongside several other weasels into the genus Neogale.

The sea mink (Neogale macrodon), native to the New England area, is considered to be a close relative of the American mink. Its extinction in the late 19th century, was chiefly result of hunting for the fur trade.

== Description ==
A wild male mink weighs about 1 kg (2 lb 3 oz) and is about 60 cm (23 1/2 in) in length. Farm-bred males can reach 3.2 kg (7 lb 1 oz). The female weighs about 600 g (1 lb 5 oz) and reaches a length of about 50 cm (19 1/2 in). The sizes above do not include the tail, which can be from 12.8 to 22.8 cm (5 1/16 to 9 in).

A mink's rich glossy coat in its wild state is brown and looks silky. Farm-bred mink can vary from white to almost black, which is reflected in the feral mink in Britain. Their natural pelage is deep, rich brown, with or without white spots on the underparts, and consists of a slick, dense underfur overlaid with dark, glossy, almost stiff guard hairs.

Mink show the curious phenomenon of delayed implantation. Although the true gestation period is 39 days, the embryo may stop developing for a variable period, so that as long as 76 days may elapse before the litter arrives. Between 45 and 52 days is normal. There is only one litter per year. They typically have between six and 10 kits per litter. Litters as large as 16 have been recorded at fur farms.

The maximum lifespan of a mink is usually around ten years, but rarely exceeds three years in the wild.

== Diet ==
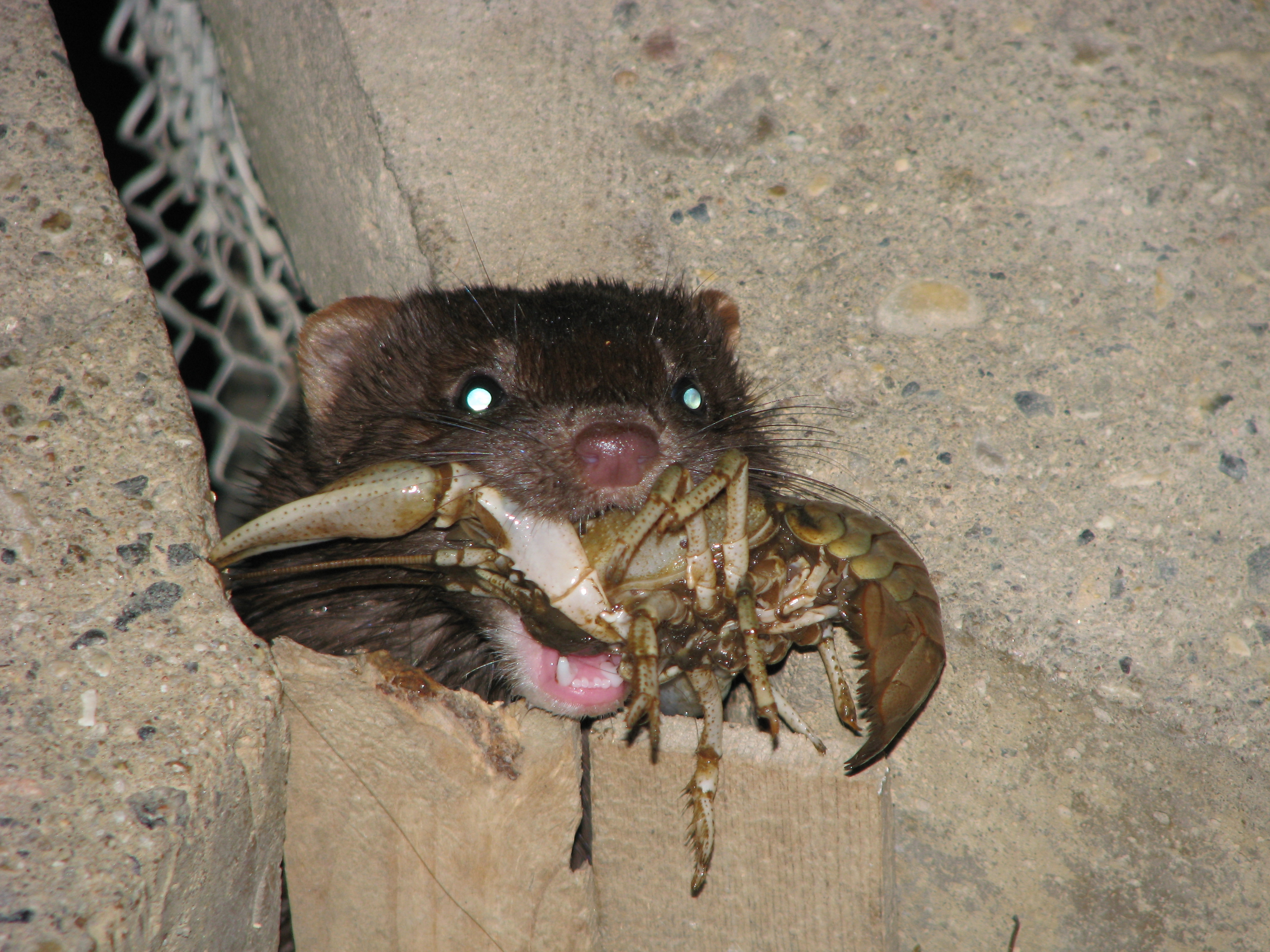
Mink eating a crayfish

Mink prey on fish and other aquatic life, small mammals, birds, and eggs; adults may eat young mink. Mink raised on farms primarily eat expired cheese, eggs, fish, meat and poultry slaughterhouse byproducts, dog food, and turkey livers, as well as prepared commercial foods. A farm with 3,000 mink may use as much as two tons of food per day.

== Habitats ==
Mink like to live near water and are seldom found far from riverbanks, lakes, and marshes. Even when roaming, they tend to follow streams and ditches. Sometimes they leave the water altogether for a few hundred metres, especially when looking for rabbits, one of their favourite foods. In some places, particularly in Scotland and in Iceland, they live along the seashore. Sometimes they live in towns if suitable water is available. Mink may be active at all hours, even when people are nearby.

== Territory ==
Mink are territorial animals. A male mink will not tolerate another male within his territory but appears to be less aggressive towards females. Generally, the territories of both male and female animals are separate, but a female's territory may sometimes overlap with that of a male.

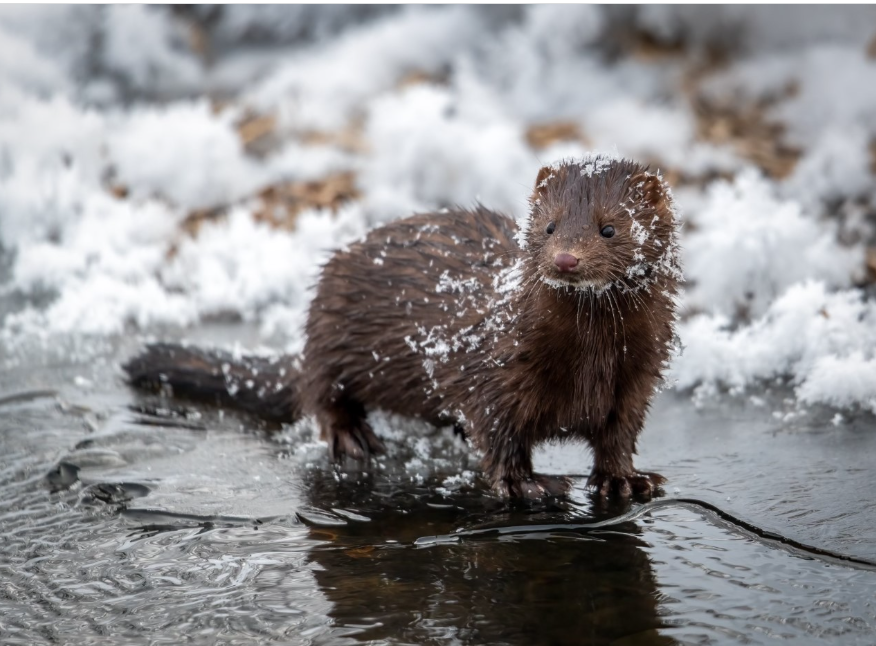
Mink at water's edge, Kenai National Wildlife Refuge, Alaska

The territories, which tend to be long and narrow, stretch along river banks, or around the edges of lakes or marshes. Territory sizes vary, but they can be several miles long. Female territories are smaller than those of males.

Each territory has one or two central areas (core areas) where the mink spends most of its time. The core area is usually associated with a good food supply, such as a pool rich in fish, or a good rabbit warren. The mink may stay in its core area, which can be quite small, for several days at a time, but it also makes excursions to the ends of its territory. These excursions seem to be associated with the defense of the territory against intruders. The mink likely checks for any signs of a stranger mink and leaves droppings (scat) with its own personal scent to reinforce its territorial rights.

== Human uses ==
=== Farming ===
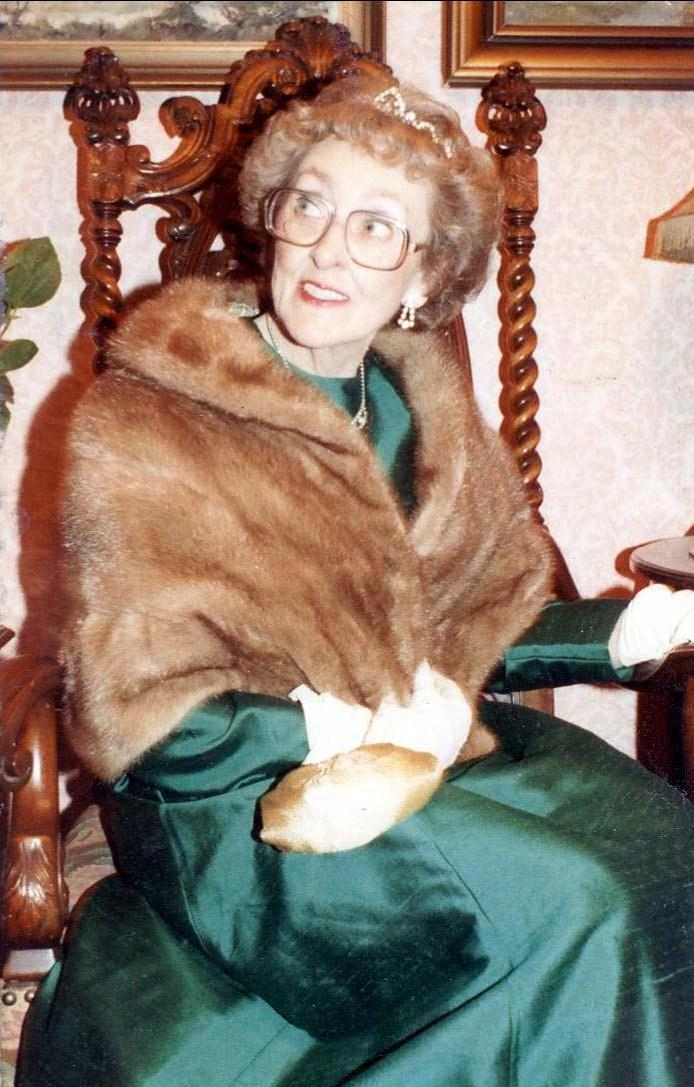
Mink fur stole

The American mink's fur has been highly prized for use in clothing, with hunting giving way to farming. Their treatment on fur farms has been a focus of animal rights and animal welfare activism. American mink have established populations in Europe (including Great Britain) and South America, after being released from mink farms by animal rights activists, or otherwise escaping from captivity. In the UK, under the Wildlife & Countryside Act 1981, it is illegal to release mink into the wild. In some countries, any live mink caught in traps must be humanely killed.

In February 2022, the US House of Representatives passed a ban on commercial mink farming following the global SARS-CoV-2 outbreak on mink farms, however it did not pass the Senate so did not become law. The ban was attempted in an effort to protect public health in light of the COVID-19 pandemic. Mink farms pose a risk of producing SARS-CoV-2 variants that could be transmitted to humans. The cramped living conditions along with the high volume of immunosuppressed mink inhabiting the farms creates a highly hospitable environment for the SARS-CoV-2 virus. Approximately 6.1 million mink have been infected with the SARS-CoV-2 virus, with three variants traced back to farms in the U.S., France, and Denmark.

==== Ireland ====
There are three mink farms in Ireland, in Donegal, Kerry, and Laois. Mink farming was introduced into the country by two veterinarians. Three thousand mink were released by campaigners into the wild from a farm in the 1960s. It is estimated that there are 33,500 wild mink in Ireland.

The Irish Department of Agriculture stated in November 2020 that the Department of Health had advised, following the detection of coronavirus among animals on a Danish mink farm, that the roughly 120,000 farmed Irish mink should be culled. Mink farming was already due to be discontinued under the 2020 Programme for Government but the coronavirus risk expedited the closure of the industry.

=== Health concerns ===
Mink are among the animals that can be infected with SARS-CoV-2 and that are also known to spread infections among themselves and to humans. Transmission of the SARS-CoV-2 virus from mink to humans was first documented in the Netherlands through genetic tracing, which prompted the government to advance to the end of 2020 a ban on mink farming scheduled for 2024. The United States Department of Agriculture confirmed that cases of minks infected with COVID-19 had been documented in Utah in August 2020.

In November 2020, Denmark, then the world's largest producer of mink fur, slaughtered its entire mink population of 15 to 17 million animals to stop the spread of Cluster 5, a mutated strain of the virus, which has been linked to the animals and resulted in the infection of 12 humans with the mutated variant. The decision was later deemed to have been illegal, although the law was later changed in support of the action. Infections within mink were also deemed ancestral to a highly mutated SARS-CoV-2 strain found in Canadian white-tailed deer which subsequently spilled back into humans.

Influenza (flu) is another disease with strains that have very high mortality among humans. For example, H5N1 bird flu kills about half the people it infects. As of 2026 it does not transfer easily between humans; the few cases there have been were contracted from contact with birds. Mink can be infected by both avian and human flu viruses; an infection with both lets the viruses exchange genetic material, with the potential to produce a virus as lethal as bird flu and as transmissible as human flu. It has been pointed out that mink infections have very high zoonotic potential, transmitting readily to humans and other animals. Farmed mink are fed on unwanted offcuts of chickens and other farm animals, which can lead to them contracting flu from infected fodder. This poses a serious risk of a devastating pandemic of highly infectious and virulent flu.

Similar to their role of a viral incubator in the COVID-19 pandemic, in October 2022, mink at a farm in Spain became the first observed case of mammal-to-mammal transmission of Influenza A virus subtype H5N1, an avian flu which had only previously jumped to mammals upon close contact or consumption of infected birds. The infected mink in Spain exhibited multiple new mutations when compared to viral sequences obtained from infected birds, one of which helps H5N1 to better replicate within mammals. While the Spanish incident did not lead to human cases, mink farming poses a serious risk of a devastating pandemic of highly infectious and virulent flu.

=== Stereotypy ===
On farms, minks are placed in battery cages, a type of soft, metal wire cage that restricts their ability to move. This often results in a condition referred to as stereotypies, an abnormal behaviour. These abnormal, repetitive behaviours are a result of keeping them imprisoned, and is similar to the deterioration of mental health in humans. Stereotypies have also been noted to increase during human presence.

To attempt to eliminate stereotypies in captive mink, the Canadian National Farm Animal Care Council has implemented regulations on incorporating environmental enrichments into mink cages. Enrichments are pen-related alterations or the addition of novel objects to improve the mink's physical and psychological health. Enrichments may help reduce the onset of stereotypies, but rarely decrease or eliminate them entirely. Leaving minks alone plays a large role in the prevention of stereotypies, and the animals' well-being.
