= Arthur Robert Harding =

American editor

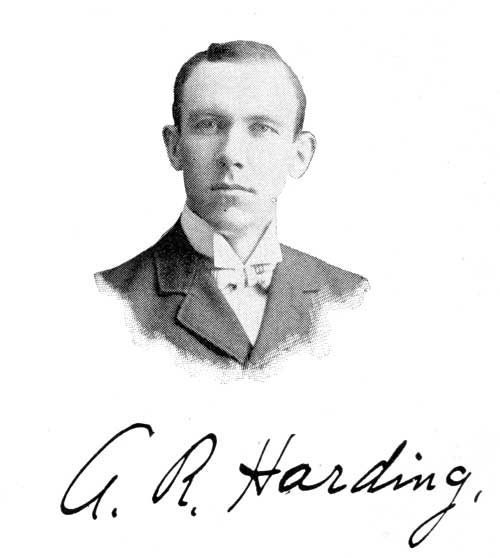
- A. R. Harding.
- Born: Arthur Robert Harding; 1871; Ohio
- Died: 1930 (aged 58–59)
- Occupations: Trapper, Fur Buyer, Publisher, Editor and Author
- Writing career
- Period: 1898–1930
- Genre: Non-fiction
- Subjects: Hunting, trapping, fur handling, tanning, taxidermy, bee hunting and wilderness camping

Arthur Robert Harding (July 1871 – 1930), better known as A. R. Harding, was an American outdoorsman and the founder of Hunter-Trader-Trapper and Fur-Fish-Game Magazine, and publisher, editor and author of many popular outdoor how-to books of the early 1900s. His company was known as the A. R. Harding Publishing Company of Columbus, Ohio, and St. Louis, Missouri.

== Family background ==
A. R. Harding, the son of Alvin Bartlett Harding (1835–1908) and Mary "Mollie" Thompson Harding (1844–1910), was born July 1871 in Gallia County, Ohio. The family lived in Cheshire Township, Gallia County, Ohio, near Kyger, along the Ohio River. Arthur's only sibling was a brother, Howard M. Harding, who became a produce dealer in Gallipolis, Ohio.

Arthur married Marilla Vincent on October 29, 1902, in Gallipolis. They had two children, Louise Harding and Arthur V. Harding, and made their home in Columbus, Ohio.

A. R. Harding died in 1930.

== Early career ==
Harding began hunting and trapping at the age of nine. At age 14, he was buying pelts from boys in his neighborhood, and reselling them at a profit. Making his rounds on horseback, he carried most of the pelts in a sack, but tied the fox skins to the saddle to show that his business was doing well. By the age of 20, Harding was employed by L. Frank & Sons, Ohio's Reliable Fur and Hide Dealers, of Zanesville, Ohio, as a fur buyer.

== Beginnings of Hunter-Trader-Trapper ==
With an interest in publishing, in 1898 Harding and a friend in the printing business founded the Gallia Times, a weekly newspaper serving Gallia County, Ohio. In October 1900 he published the first issue of Hunter-Trader-Trapper, (aka H-T-T), a 24-page magazine with articles about hunting, trapping, fur farming and the fur trade. A one-year subscription sold for 50 cents, and advertisements came largely from the fur buying houses of New York.

The instant success of the Hunter-Trader-Trapper magazine was due to the instructional nature of the contents on the subjects of hunting and trapping, information previously shared only between friends and family members, and in most cases kept secret by outdoorsmen. The magazine was largely composed of letters written by the readers, longer articles by experienced hunters and trappers, and news concerning the fur trade and current prices. Questions submitted by subscribers were published along with answers, as were correspondents' personal opinions about all sorts of outdoor subjects.

A. R. Harding sold the Gallia Times newspaper in 1904 and moved his operations from Gallipolis to 326 East Broad Street, Columbus, Ohio. There he devoted his time fully to the magazine, which had grown from 24 to sometimes over 160 pages in length. He continued to expand his reading audience by offering premiums to readers who signed up new subscribers. One new subscription earned a Newhouse trap, and thirty-two new subscriptions would earn a Winchester Model 1890 repeating rifle.

== Pleasure and Profit Books ==
In 1906 the A. R. Harding Publishing Company copyrighted and produced Fox Trapping and Mink Trapping, the first in what would become a long line of instructional books. These were the first widely distributed books published about traps and trapping methods. In 1907, three new titles were added to the series: Deadfalls and Snares, Steel Traps and Canadian Wilds.

In 1908 Harding moved his operations to the Columbus Savings and Trust Building, and that year released three more books: Ginseng and Other Medicinal Plants, Land Cruising and Prospecting and Bee Hunting. In the spring of 1909, Harding published Fur Farming; in June 1909, Science of Trapping; and later the same year, Hunting Dogs and Wolf and Coyote Trapping.

In December 1909, Harding started a weekly publication called Camp and Trail, which was incorporated into the Hunter-Trader-Trapper by August 1913. The addition broadened the focus of the magazine to include these recreational activities.

A new book, Camp and Trail Methods, was released in 1910, and Science of Fishing in 1912.

In October 1912, the A. R. Harding Publishing Company moved to 55–57 East Main Street, Columbus, Ohio.

The September 1912 issue of Hunter-Trader-Trapper listed their available books, and the order in which they were published, along with the following statement:

Thus it will be seen that fourteen have already been published. These cover the subjects of hunting, fishing, trapping, camping, prospecting, bee hunting, fur farming, ginseng and other medicinal root growing.

What is more to your interest these books are written by men, who know what they write from experience. Mr. E. Kreps is the author of Camp and Trail Methods and Science of Trapping; Martin Hunter wrote Canadian Wilds; A. F. Wallace wrote Land Cruising and Prospecting; John R. Lockard wrote Bee Hunting; Lake Brooks wrote Science of Fishing. The others were written by A. R. Harding. Each of these books tell in a plain manner what you want to know. At any rate the tens of thousands that have bought those first published are among the first to purchase the new ones as issued.

In 1913, six books were added to "Harding's Pleasure and Profit Books": Fifty Years a Hunter and Trapper by Eldred Nathaniel Woodcock; Game, Fur and Fish Laws and 3001 Questions and Answers by A. R. Harding; and A Trip on the Great Lakes and The Cabin Boat Primer by Raymond S. Spears. "Pearls and Pearling" by Herbert H. Vertress.

In 1914, due to poor health, Harding sold the Hunter-Trader-Trapper magazine, but continued to sell his books while adding more titles. Ferret Facts and Fancies and Fur Buyer's Guide were released in 1915, and two books by Albert Burton Farnham in 1916, Home Taxidermy for Pleasure and Profit and Home Manufacture of Furs and Skins. In 1922, he published another work by Farnham, Home Tanning and Leather Making Guide.

== Beginnings of Fur-Fish-Game ==
Harding had regained his health by 1925, and attempted to buy back the Hunter-Trader-Trapper magazine. When the owners refused to sell he purchased instead the publication Fur News, which included information along the same lines, and changed its name to Fur-Fish-Game. He ask his readers to submit articles for publishing, regarding this material as "... often of more interest and value than much that is written in flowing language by those who follow writing as a business."

In 1927, Harding published Practical Muskrat Raising by E. J. Dailey.

Harding died in 1930; his former magazine, Hunter-Trader-Trapper, remained in publication until the late 1930s, and Fur-Fish-Game, also known as Harding's Magazine, is still published today. The company is now owned and operated by the fourth generation of his family.

== Impact on Fur Trade and Game Laws ==
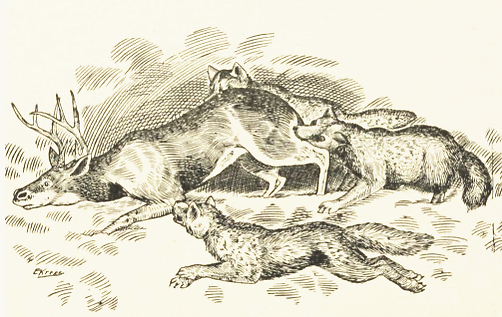
"Wolves killing Caribou", in Harding's Wolf and Coyote Trapping, 1909

Harding's books and magazines had an enormous impact on trapping, trap manufacturing, the fur trade, conservation and game laws.

The plain language of his magazines, with personal instructions and actual experiences written by the readers, made it a favorite of the average hunter, trapper and fisherman, who gained access to information about new equipment and better methods. This increased the popularity of these pursuits, especially trapping, while also increasing the skill, efficiency and profits of the trappers.

Harding's national magazines were the first to let trap and gun manufacturers and fur buying houses advertise directly to their main customers. These companies purchased full-page advertisements to promote their products and services, which grew their businesses. The last chapter included in nearly all of Harding's books about trapping comprised a catalog of Newhouse traps, made by the Oneida Community, Ltd. of Oneida, New York.

The customers used Harding's magazines to tell manufacturers the features they liked and disliked about their products, which sparked the design of better equipment.

Harding was one of the first national advocates of scientific wildlife management, conservation and good sportsmanship. In his articles, he called for a closed season on furbearers, at a time when many states allowed year-round trapping and hunting. He fought to make the game laws fair and consistent, and opposed the federal government's use of poison to kill wolves and coyotes.

His books and articles on fur farming accelerated the industry's potential. With the depletion of the beaver in Canada, the growing demand for fur articles, and the development of new dyeing techniques (which allowed mock furs to be made from cheaper pelts), the easily obtained, how-to information that Harding offered helped to quickly expand the home enterprise of raising furbearers. Harding's motives for supporting this business were not entirely profit-driven: he believed that fur farming would help reduce the pressure on wild populations, which were being destroyed through habitat depletion, and save the furbearers from extinction.

== Harding's Pleasure & Profit Books ==
A list of 24 instructional books published by Arthur Robert Harding.

Year	Book Title	Author/Editor	Online Image	Online eBook
1906	Fox Trapping	Arthur Robert Harding	Internet Archive	Gutenberg
1906	Mink Trapping	Arthur Robert Harding	Internet Archive	Gutenberg
1907	Deadfalls and Snares	Arthur Robert Harding	Internet Archive	Gutenberg
1907	Steel Traps	Arthur Robert Harding	Internet Archive	Gutenberg
1907	Canadian Wilds	Martin Hunter	Internet Archive	Gutenberg
1908	Ginseng and Other Medicinal Plants	Arthur Robert Harding	Internet Archive	Gutenberg
1908	Land Cruising and Prospecting	Arthur Fuller Wallace	Goggle Books	Gutenberg
1908	Bee Hunting	John Ready Lockard	Internet Archive	Gutenberg
1909	Fur Farming	Arthur Robert Harding	Internet Archive	Gutenberg
1909	The Science of Trapping	Elmer Harry Kreps	Internet Archive	Gutenberg
1909	Hunting Dogs	Oliver Hartley	Internet Archive	Gutenberg
1909	Wolf and Coyote Trapping	Arthur Robert Harding	Internet Archive	Gutenberg
1910	Camp and Trail Methods	Elmer Harry Kreps	Google Books	Gutenberg
1913	Fifty Years a Hunter and Trapper	Eldred Nathaniel Woodcock	Internet Archive	Gutenberg
1913	Game, Fur and Fish Laws	Arthur Robert Harding	Internet Archive	Gutenberg
1913	3001 Questions & Answers	Arthur Robert Harding	Google Books	Gutenberg
1913	A Trip on the Great Lakes	Raymond S. Spears	Internet Archive	Gutenberg
1913	The Cabin Boat Primer	Raymond S. Spears	Internet Archive	Gutenberg
1915	Ferret Facts and Fancies	Arthur Robert Harding	Internet Archive	Gutenberg
1915	Fur Buyer's Guide	Arthur Robert Harding	Internet Archive	Gutenberg
1916	Home Taxidermy for Pleasure and Profit	Albert Burton Farnham	Google Books	Gutenberg
1916	Home Manufacture of Furs and Skins	Albert Burton Farnham	Internet Archive	Gutenberg
1922	Home Tanning and Leather Making Guide	Albert Burton Farnham	Google Books	Gutenberg
1927	Practical Muskrat Raising	E. J. Dailey	Internet Archive	Gutenberg
