= Fur-Fish-Game =

- Editor: John D. Taylor
- Categories: Hunting/fishing magazine
- Frequency: Monthly
- Circulation: 116,316
- Publisher: A. R. Harding
- First issue: September 1925
- Company: AR Harding Publishing Co.
- Country: USA
- Based in: Columbus, Ohio
- Language: English
- Website: furfishgame.com
- ISSN: 0016-2922

Fur-Fish-Game (often called Fur, Fish and Game or FFG) is an American outdoors magazine. FFG features how-to articles and tips, descriptions of outdoor sporting products, and first-person stories of outdoor adventure and survival. Subtitled The magazine for practical outdoorsman, FFG focuses on hunting, fishing, and other outdoor activities more as a part of rural life than as a hobby or sport. Unlike most outdoor magazine, FFG also includes updates about fur prices and advice for outdoorsman who run traplines and sell furs.

== History ==
Founder Arthur R. Harding began Hunter-Trader-Trapper magazine in 1900, primarily as a report on fur prices for trappers, traders, and exporters. As the only magazine to provide this information, it was an immediate success. In 1914, Harding sold the magazine due to poor health. When he recovered in 1925, his offer to repurchase the magazine was rebuffed, so Harding bought another magazine, Fur News and Outdoor World, and changed the name to Fur-Fish-Game.

Harding outlined his philosophy for the new magazine:

"FUR-FISH-GAME wants articles from subscribers telling of their actual experiences-whether hunting, trapping, fur buying, fishing, camping, fur farming, medicinal root growing, etc.-with photographs if possible. The editor believes that such material is often of more interest and value than much that is written in flowing language by those who follow writing as a business. F-F-G will be of practical pleasure and profit- edited and published for those who wish to read in plain, everyday language about fur, fish, game and allied interests."

== FFG today ==
FFG is still published monthly by Harding's descendants. Although there is less emphasis on fur and trapping than in decades past, the magazine maintains its pragmatic approach to outdoor life. The current BPA audited average paid circulation is 121,162.

=== Features and regular columns ===
- "Fish & Tackle"
- "Fur Market Report"
- "Predator Hunting"
- "The Gun Rack"
- "I Knew That!" (useful tips and ideas supplied by readers)
- "New Products"
- "News and Notes"
- "The Question Box"
- "The Trapline"
