= Trapline =

Route along which a trapper sets traps

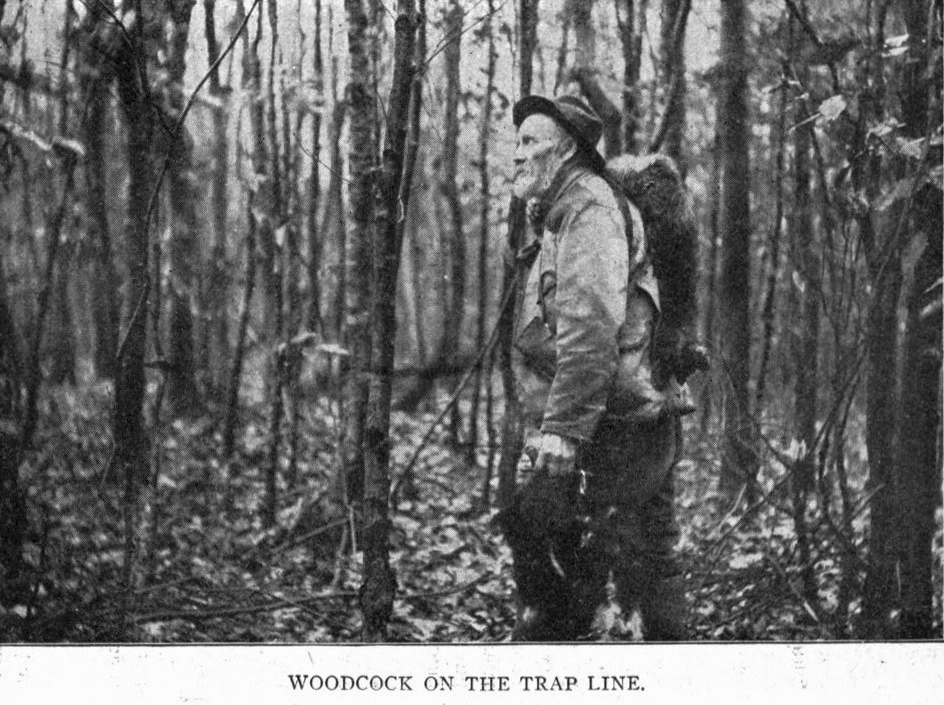
A photo of a trapper on his line from the 1913 American autobiography Fifty Years a Hunter and Trapper

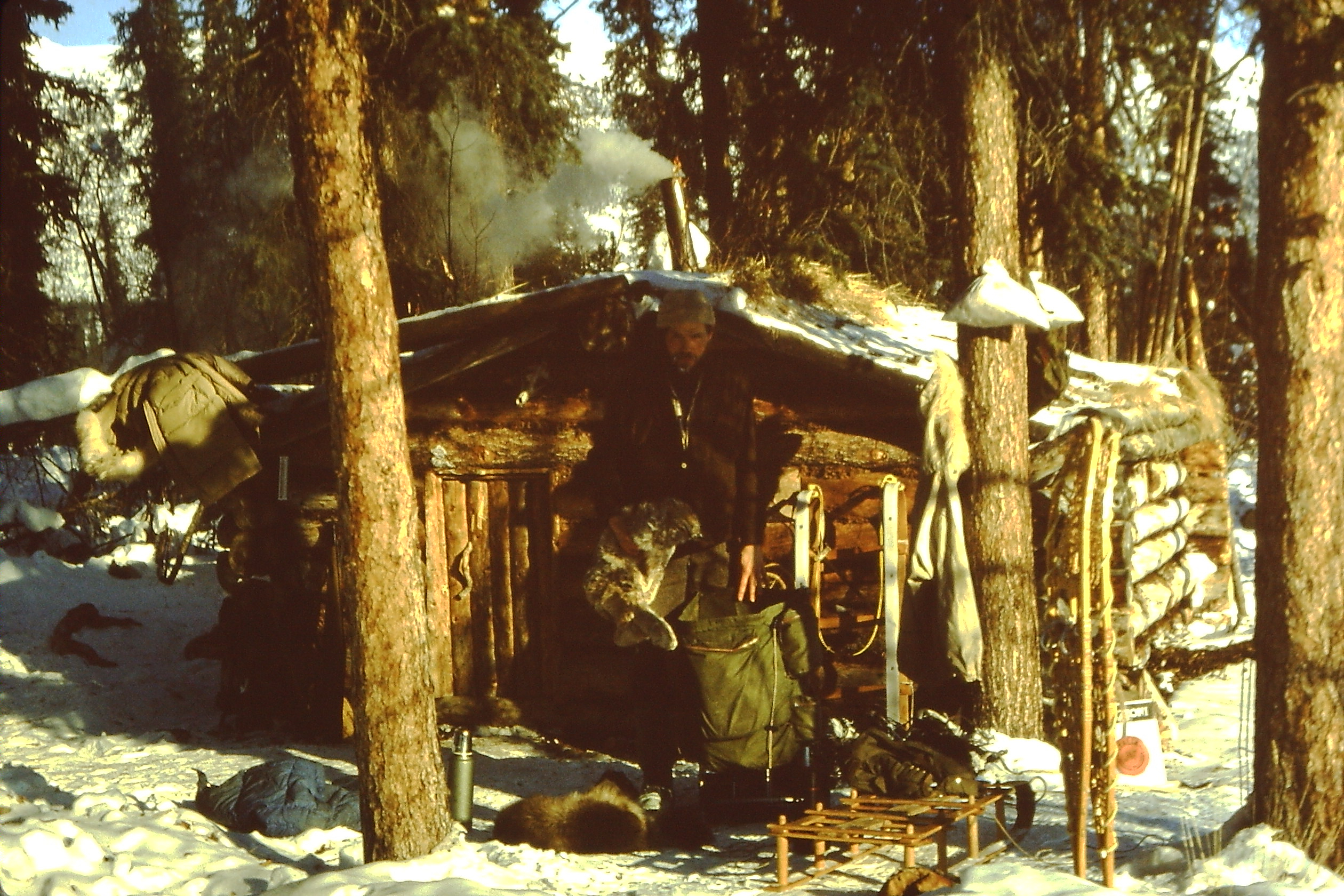
A photo of a modern trapper's cabin from the Brooks Range in Alaska

In the fur trade, a trapline is a route along which a trapper sets traps for their quarry. Trappers traditionally move habitually along the route to set and check the traps, in so doing become skilled at traversing remote terrain, and become experts in the geography of the local area. Because of this traditional knowledge, traplines are not only of interest to trappers themselves but to researchers and others (governments, corporations) interested in local history, biology, and topography. The assignment of particular trapline territories to individuals in band societies was traditionally handled by group consensus, and occasionally violence and warfare. In the present-day trapline assignment is typically formalized and controlled by the state. Formalized trapline territory boundaries now form the basis for many major land-use projects in fur-rich regions.

One of the entitlements that goes along with possessing a trap territory is the right to erect a trapper's cabin: a simple shelter in which a trapper can stay while moving around his territory. Trappers' cabins are a cultural icon of fur regions, and an important part of the national mythos of countries and regions such as Canada and Alaska, and among groups such as the Métis.

== Pre-treaty indigenous governance of trapping and other harvesting ==
Before European colonisation, determining where a particular family or band could hunt, fish, and gather without encroaching on others to the point of over-harvesting was the main preoccupation of indigenous governance in the subarctic and other non-farming regions. Councils were convened to reconcile disputes and warfare was always a possibility.

When European traders began exporting bulk amounts of fur to Europe in the eighteenth and nineteenth centuries, the trapping territories of the subarctic became much more commercially valuable and disputes intensified.

== Registered traplines ==
In Canada formal trapping territories assigned by the state are typically called "registered traplines" (RTLs), though each province administers its own system; they have been common across Canada since the 1930s.

Alberta's registered traplines were once exactly that: lines which followed a creek or other feature, but in the 1960s they were switched to a system of trapping territories.

In British Columbia "the registered trapline system continues to be the primary system for setting harvest guidelines and managing furbearing animals". It is an offence to trap an animal on a registered trapline that does not belong to you in BC.

Manitoba has had registered traplines since 1940; they were brought in at that time to stop a wave of new arrivals in Northern Manitoba from trapping out an area that was already overharvested by the local, mostly First Nations, population. The system is administered under the province's Wildlife Act. Lines cannot be sold, inherited, or handed down, but are awarded through a points system, where preference is given to people with a close family relationship to the previous lineholder, a history of using that trapline with the permission of the previous lienholder, and residency near the territory.

As of 2013 Ontario has more than 2,800 registered traplines on Crown land.

Since the 2001 Paix des braves agreement, trapline territories have been used as the basis for forestry and mining planning in the Eeyou Istchee territory, in Quebec.

=== Indigenous land claims ===
Indigenous peoples have not always welcomed the regulation of the fur industry by provincial authorities, and the assignment of trapping territories by the provincial Crown implies that the land is ultimately the property of the province, to be disposed of at its will, rather than subject to comanagement under the terms of the treaties. Furthermore, having to apply to provincial authorities to distribute traplines removes control of the process from local Indigenous forms of governance, and institutionalizes a non-Indigenous presence on traditional lands. Nevertheless, as registered traplines provide Aboriginal peoples with legal rights to a piece of land off-reserve, a potential economic livelihood, and a connection to a traditional lifestyle, registered traplines are considered of the utmost importance for many First Nations and Métis communities.
