= Hunter-Trader-Trapper =

American outdoors magazine

Hunter-Trader-Trapper was an American outdoors magazine created by Arthur Robert Harding. It ran from 1900 to 1938. The magazine was published first in Gallia County, Ohio, and then in Columbus, Ohio. In 1919 the publishers were F. J. and W. F Heer, the business manager was W. F. Heer, and the managing editor was Otto Kuechler.

== See also ==
- Huntin' Fool, since 1995 monthly magazine for big game hunting in Western United States
