= Mink Trapping =

1906 book by Arthur Robert Harding

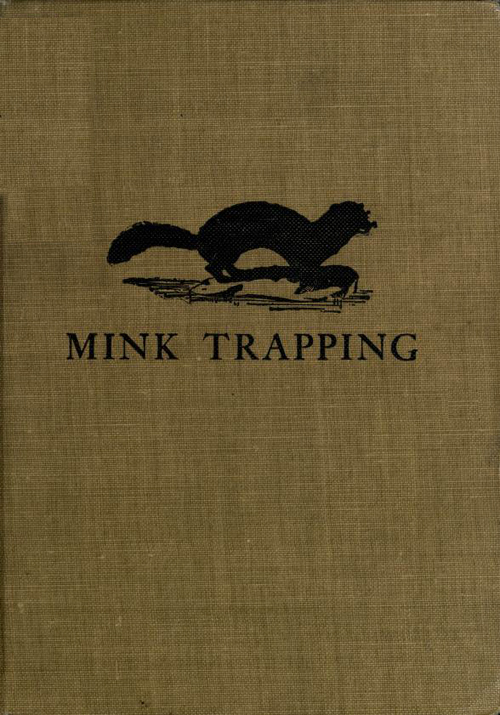
- Mink Trapping Cover (1906)
- Author: Arthur Robert Harding
- Language: English
- Genre: Non-fiction
- Publisher: A. R. Harding Publishing Co.
- Publication date: August 6, 1906 (copyright)
- Publication place: United States of America
- Media type: Print (hardcover)
- Pages: 183 pp
- Preceded by: Fox Trapping
- Followed by: Deadfalls and Snares

Mink Trapping is an American reference book focused on trapping of mink. It was published on August 6, 1906, and is part of the collection "Harding's Pleasure & Profit Books." The book comprises mink trapping instructions and tips from the author and other trappers in the United States and Canada, including photographs and illustrations. It provides information on where and how to set traps for mink, covering land and water setups, blind sets, baits, and scents to use. Additionally, it discusses methods applicable in Northern and Southern states, as well as guidance on the size and care of skins.

== Excerpts ==
=== Chapter 2, Mink And Their Habits, page 23 ===
"I have had a world of experience trapping but very limited at catching, says an Arkansas trapper, "yet plenty of both to be fully capable of solving the question as to whether or not mink are afraid of the scent of iron. It is simply this. Some mink are positively afraid of it and some are positively not so."

=== Chapter 14, Many Good Methods, page 113 ===
"The mink is very cunning and hard to catch in a steel trap unless you know how and where to set, which is about the only secret there is in catching mink. I have had people write to know what scent I used and how I set traps. A man can learn better methods as long as he traps—experience is the best teacher and unless he is willing to work hard he will never make a successful trapper of any kind of game." – Moses Bone

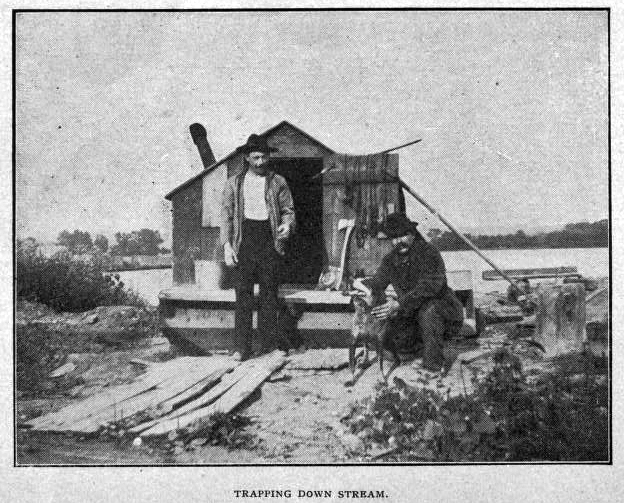
Trapping Down Stream

== Contents (First Edition 1906) ==
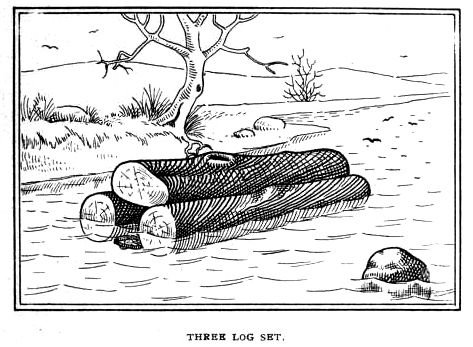
Three Log Set

1. General Information

2. Mink and Their Habits

3. Size and Care of Skins

4. Good and Lasting Baits

5. Bait and Scent

6. Places to Set

7. Indian Methods

8. Mink Trapping on the Prairie

9. Southern Methods

10. Northern Methods

11. Unusual Ways

12. Illinois Trapper's Method

13. Experienced Trapper's Ways

14. Many Good Methods

15. Salt Set

16. Log and Other Sets

17. Points for the Young Trapper

18. Proper Size Traps

19. Deadfalls

20. Steel Traps

== Publication ==
First published by A. R. Harding Publishing Company in Columbus, Ohio, dated August 6, 1906 (copyright). Later editions are currently available in hardcover and paperback.

== Critical Response ==
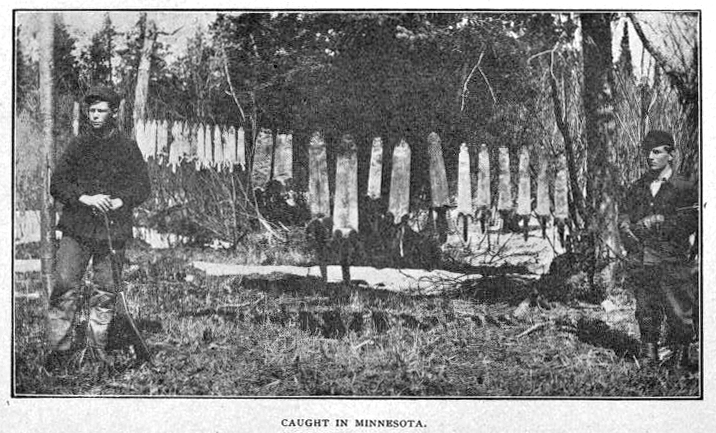
Caught in Minnesota

=== Hunter-Trader-Trapper Magazine, Vol 15, No. 1, Oct 1907 ===
MINK TRAPPING – While this book has only been upon the market about one year the first edition is nearly sold and the second is being printed and bound. While this book contains less than 200 pages 5x7 inches it is by far the best book for mink trappers ever produced. The author in his introduction says: "While there are some excellent mink trappers no one man has studied out all the methods, for the conditions under which the trapper in the South makes his largest catches would probably be of little to the trapper of the Far North, where snow covers the ground the greater part of year. Conditions along the Atlantic are different than the Pacific, and the methods used by thousands of trappers along the Mississippi and its tributaries differ from those used by Eastern or Western Coast trappers, for the mink's food is not the same along fresh inland waters as the coast or salt water. The methods published are from all of the country, and many experienced trappers tell of their best methods, so that it makes no difference in what part of you live, something will be found of to trap in your section. Most of the articles are taken from those published in the H-T-T with slight correction."
