= Deadfalls and Snares =

Book by Arthur Robert Harding

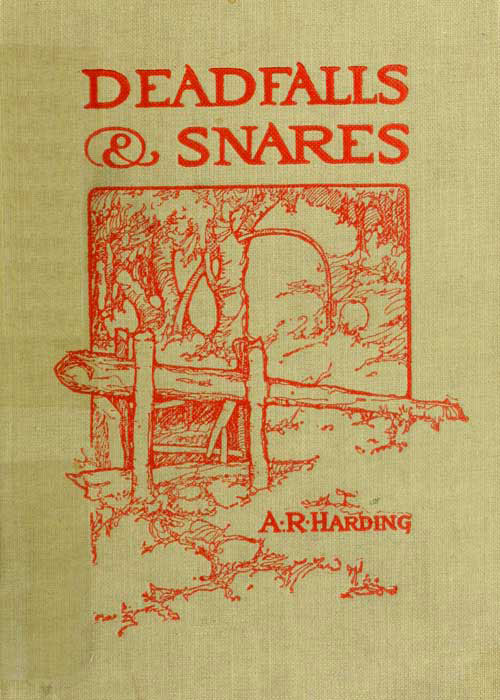
- Deadfalls and Snares Cover (1907)
- Author: Arthur Robert Harding
- Language: English
- Publisher: A. R. Harding Publishing Co.
- Publication date: 1907 (copyright)
- Publication place: United States
- Media type: Print (hardcover)
- Pages: 232 pp
- Preceded by: Mink Trapping
- Followed by: Steel Traps

Deadfalls and Snares: A Book of Instruction for Trappers About These and Other Home-Made Traps is a 1907 book by A. R. Harding.

== Summary ==
Deadfalls and Snares is one of Harding's Pleasure & Profit Books. First published in 1907, is an instructional book for trappers on the art of building deadfalls from logs, boards and rocks, and making snares and toss poles, for catching all types of furbearers, such as skunk, opossum, raccoon, mink, marten and bear, and coop traps for catching wild turkey and quail.

The author states that thousands of trappers around the world use deadfalls, snares and other homemade traps, but among American trappers there are many thousand who know little or nothing about them.

The book contains 50 line drawings of differently constructed deadfalls made of logs, boards or stones, coop or pen style traps, trigger designs, and snare sets. There are also chapters on skinning, stretching, handling and grading fur pelts, plus a listing of Newhouse steel traps, available in the early 1900s.

The building, baiting and setting instructions are written by various American and Canadian trappers who are named only by their country or state of residence.

== Excerpts and illustrations ==
=== Chapter one, page 17 ===
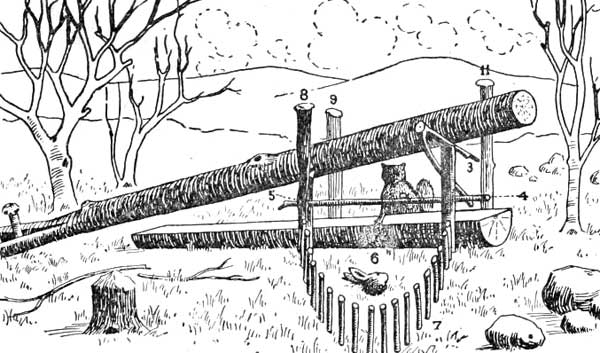
Trip deadfall.

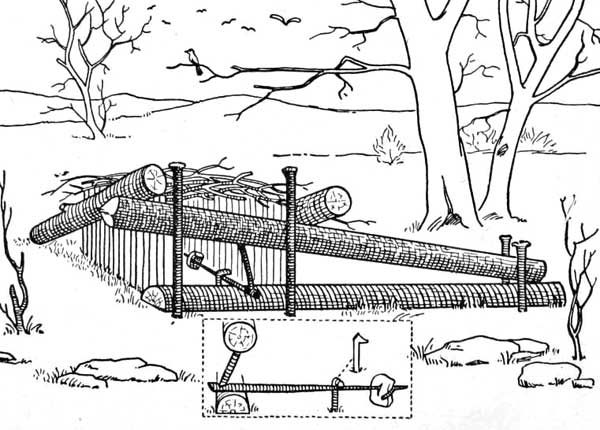
Trigger deadfall.

Another trapper says: In my opinion trapping is an art and any trapper that is not able to make and set a deadfall, when occasion demands, does not belong to the profession. I will give a few of the many reasons why dead falls are good.

- There is no weight to carry.
- Many of the best trappers use them.
- It requires no capital to set a line of deadfalls.
- There is no loss of traps by trap thieves, but the fur is in as much danger.
- Deadfalls do not mangle animals or injure their fur.
- It is a humane way of killing animals.
- There is no loss by animals twisting off a foot or leg and getting away.
- Animals are killed outright, having no chance to warn others of their kind by their cries from being caught.
- Trappers always have the necessary outfit (axe and knife) with them to make and set a deadfall that will kill the largest animals.
- The largest deadfalls can be made to spring easy and catch small game if required.
- Deadfalls will kill skunk without leaving any scent.
- Deadfalls are cheap and trappers should be familiar with them.

It is a safe proposition, however, that not one-half of the trappers of today can build a deadfall properly or know how to make snares, and many of them have not so much as seen one.

=== Chapter eight, page 82 ===
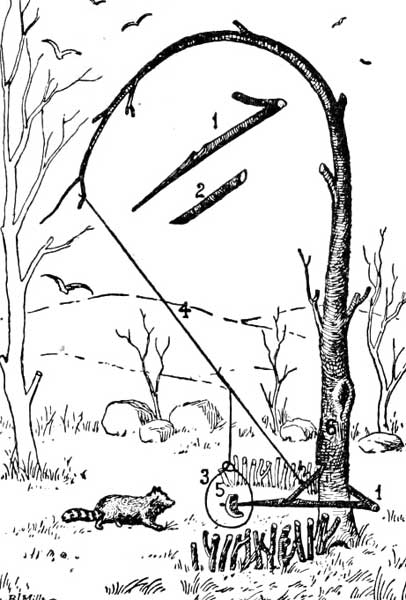
Snare and spring pole set.

During my trapping experiences I remember of visiting an old trapper's deadfalls and at that time I had never seen or used any trigger other than the figure 4, but this trapper used the prop and spindle. I looked at several of his traps; in fact, went considerably out of my way to look at some eight or ten of them. Two of these contained game — a skunk and opossum. I had often heard of these triggers, but was skeptical about them being much good. I now saw that these triggers were all right and on visiting my traps again set a few of them with these triggers. Since that time I have never used the figure 4.

=== Chapter twelve, page 109 ===
Yes, boys, the deadfall is a splendid trap if made right, says an Arkansas trapper. I will tell you how to make one that will catch every mink and coon that runs the creek. Take a pole four feet long and four inches through, next get a log six inches through and eight feet long. Use eight stakes and two switches. Use the figure four trigger, but the notches are cut different. Both of the notches are cut on the top side of the long trigger and a notch cut in the upright trigger and down the long trigger. The paddle part is sixteen inches long. When the trap is set the paddle wants to be level and one-half inch higher than small logs, then your two switches comes in this to keep the paddle from hitting the bark on side logs.

== Chapters ==
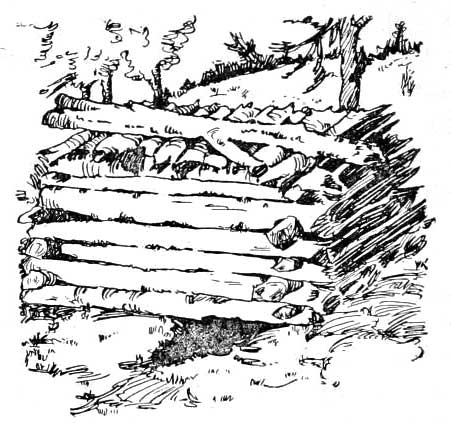
Coop trap.

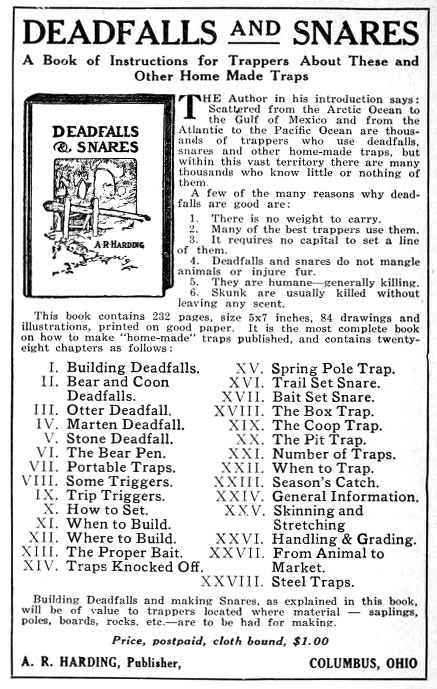
Deadfalls and Snares Advertisement, 1915

1. Building Deadfalls
2. Bear and Coon Deadfall
3. Otter Deadfall
4. Marten Deadfall
5. Stone Deadfall
6. The Bear Pen
7. Portable Traps
8. Some Triggers
9. Trip Triggers
10. How to Set
11. When to Build
12. Where to Build
13. The Proper Bait
14. Traps Knocked Off
15. Spring Pole Snare
16. Trail Set Snare
17. Bait Set Snare
18. The Box Trap
19. The Coop Trap
20. The Pit Trap
21. Number of Traps
22. When to Trap
23. Season's Catch
24. General Information
25. Skinning and Stretching
26. Handling and Grading
27. From Animal to Market

== Publication ==
First published by A. R. Harding Publishing Company, Columbus, Ohio, July 11, 1907 (copyright), new editions are currently available from various book sellers.
