= Environmental impacts of fur farming =

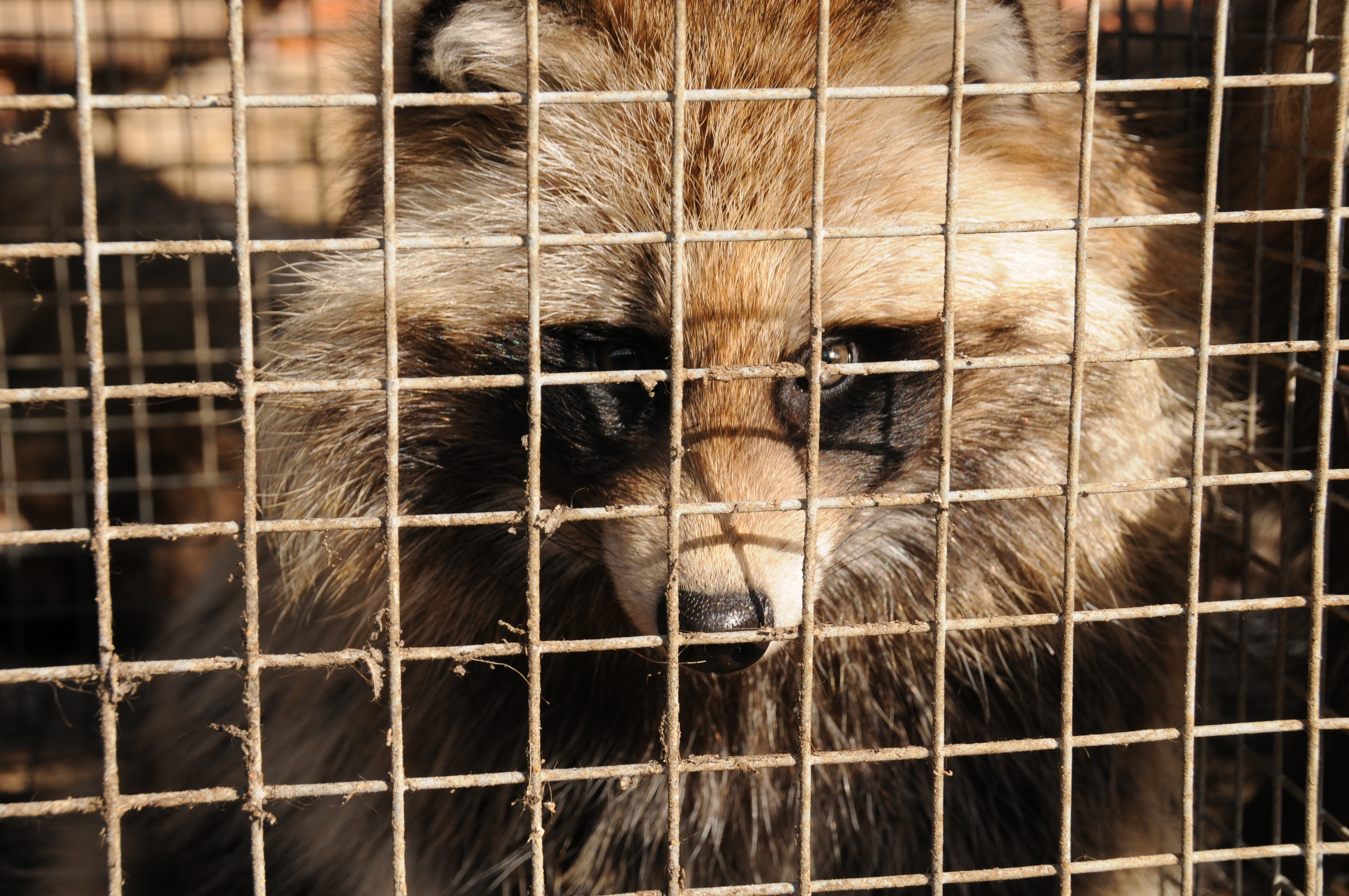
Caged raccoon dog at a fur farm in China

Fur farming is the process of breeding animals in captivity for the purpose of harvesting their fur to be sold primarily for clothing purposes. Fur is no longer primarily obtained through animal trapping; most fur comes from farms, where animals are raised to be killed for their fur. Fur farming operations provide about 80 percent of overall fur production. Common sources of fur include mink, raccoon, and fox. Up to 30 million mink furs are produced annually in North America and Europe. The production of pelts involves large-scale tanning and disposal of animal carcasses after they are skinned. Environmental impacts associated with fur production include emissions of greenhouse gases, use of chemicals in tanning, and fossil fuel consumption.

Some conservationists say that fur farming could have a positive environmental impact, reducing the pressure of wild-animal population growth. According to fur-farming advocates, it relies on sustainable resources which can be recycled. Fur industrialists call their practices agriculturally "green" compared with the production of fake fur, because they are enhancing a natural product instead of creating a new one; faux-fur fibers, produced with non-sustainable resources, have a negative environmental impact.

== Processing ==
Fur from the wild (or from fur farms) is stripped from the animal, chemically preserved, and auctioned at a trading house. The fur then often undergoes further refining, and may be dyed for clothing purposes before being sold. Unique, differently-colored pelts may also be obtained by cross-breeding. Cross- and inbreeding fur animals are common to obtain particular characteristics. On fur farms, animals are raised in cages indoors and outside; they are fed artificial feed until they are mature enough to kill with the forced inhalation of carbon dioxide or carbon monoxide. A carcass is stripped of oils and fats (which are processed for commercial use) before it is frozen for transport to an incineration facility.

== Environmental Effects ==
Pollution is released during the fur-cultivation process. When animal carcasses are incinerated, the released gases – which include carbon monoxide (CO), nitrogen oxide (NO_{x}), sulfur dioxide (SO_{2}), and hydrochloric acid (HCl) – can cause atmospheric pollution. Tanning and dressing also contribute to environmental pollution, with chemicals such as formaldehyde, chromium, ammonia, chlorine, ethylene glycol, sulfuric acid, and zinc applied to the pelt to inhibit decay of the fur. Formaldehyde and chromium are on the EPA Toxics Reporting Industry (TRI) list, the American Apparel Restricted Substances List (AAFA-RSL), and the California Proposition 65 list of chemicals known to cause cancer. These chemicals pose an overall threat to the health of workers on fur farms and consumers who wear the products; potential skin irritants, they have been identified by the Occupational Safety and Health Administration (OSHA) as carcinogens.

Manure produced by the animals can severely impact nearby ecosystems because of its high levels of nitrogen and phosphorus. According to a 2003 study published by the Fur Rancher Blue Book of Fur Farming States, about 1,000 tons of phosphorus are released into the environment annually by fur farming in the United States. Improperly-handled manure released into the surrounding environment damages water and soil, but properly-managed manure may be treated to reduce its nitrogen and phosphorus content. When manure is treated (possibly by drying), it may be used as farm fertilizer or digested in a biogas plant.

Due to the production level of fur farms, animals are disposed of at a high volume.

A study in the Netherlands found that Scots pine (Pinus sylvestris) was directly affected by its proximity to fur farms in the area. Researchers found that the deposition of ammonium (NH^{+}_{4}) led to increased soil acidification in the forest and reduced concentrations of nitrates; soil acidification has gradually changed the cellular structure of tree leaves. Increased ammonium may lead to nitrogen eutrophication in an aquatic environment, which decreases available oxygen in the water. The use of fossil fuels in conjunction with manure-sourced energy to power a farm, food for the animals, and resources used to slaughter them and preserve their fur generally result in an uneven amount of gas and nitrogen deposited into the surrounding environment.

A recent study found that fur farms were a large contributor to organic pollutants in nearby freshwater ecosystems, particularly in regards to the toxic pollutant mercury. However, another study examining shallow lakes in Nova Scotia emphasized that these cases fluctuate depending on a variety of variables such as the distance of fur farms from the body of water.

To prevent fur from decaying, manufacturers use a number of chemicals. Fur dressing has been ranked as one of the world's five worst industries for toxic-metal pollution by the World Bank. The United States Environmental Protection Agency (EPA) fined six fur-processing plants for causing high levels of pollution and using solvents in fur dressing which "may cause respiratory problems, and are listed as possible carcinogens".

== Sustainability ==
Fur farming and the manufacture of fake fur both stress the environment. Fur farms use natural fur to create commercial fur products, and fake fur is obtained from other resources. Industry representatives describe fur farming as a form of agriculture that utilizes animal byproducts and renewable materials. Fur farms implement specific operating practices to mature minks, raccoons and foxes, using animal waste as additional fuel to power the farm and biogas plants which process poultry and manure. They state that animal waste may be used in biogas production to generate energy for farm operations. A 1979 University of Michigan study found that despite the environmental cost of fake fur, however, a farmed-fur coat requires 20 times more energy. The manufacture of fake fur requires petrochemicals (a finite resource), and the acrylic nature of fake fur requires a longer processing time than natural fur before it is ready for commercial use.

== Animal Welfare ==
Animal biological function is impaired when normal behaviors are inhibited. Signs include increased morbidity, stunted growth, self-inflicted injuries, and abnormal behaviors. Five principles, known as the Five Freedoms, are used to determine whether animal welfare is being respected: freedom from hunger and thirst; freedom from discomfort; freedom from pain, injury and disease; freedom to express normal behavior, and freedom from fear and distress. In 2009, the European Fur Breeders' Association launched its "WelFur" program to perform onsite assessments at fur farms to ensure that the five principles were being followed. Its goal is to ensure that animals are being treated humanely throughout their lives. However, animals experience distress due to confinement.

The minimum cage size for a mink is 85 by 30 by 45 centimetres (33 by 12 by 18 in) – length by width by height – a total area of 2,550 square centimetres (2.74 ft^{2}). Animal-welfare organizations state that this cage size may restrict natural behaviors. In the Netherlands, minks are bred in half-open or closed sheds with a female mink having an individual confinement pen. The mother gives birth once a year, typically in April or May, to five or six young. The young are bred, and are skinned in November or December. People for the Ethical Treatment of Animals (PETA) argues ethical concerns posed by the caging of animals in fur-farming operations as a reason to ban fur farming, noting that the animals are killed inhumanely (by electrocution, suffocation, gassing or poisoning) to ensure that their pelts are of good quality.

Chinchillas, another common animal used in fur farming, can have the tendency to chew their fur under situations of stress. A study found that the fur-chewing trait has a wide range of genetic variability, but happens most often when the animal is caged. Fur farmed animals are typically kept in cages, which can lead to this type of negative behavior.

== Future Solutions ==
Fur in clothing has a practical application in colder climates, where it keeps wearers warm. Although synthetic fur is less effective for keeping warm in extremely-cold climates, it can be a substitute in warmer climates (which would result in less need for products using real fur). Anti-fur campaigns, such as PETA's, increase awareness of animal-welfare issues and reduce demand for real fur. Several governments have introduced regulations governing fur labeling and farm standards. For example, the United States enacted the Truth in Fur Labeling Act (HR 2480) in 2010, ensuring that the source species is identified when a fur product is sold. This informs the consumer that the product involved the death of an animal. Celebrities and commercial entities with a financial interest in the industry, in contrast, popularize real fur. The long-term desirability of real fur has been questioned. Some analysts have suggested that stricter regulations in certain countries may influence global production patterns. Government regulation and public education may lessen the demand for farmed fur.

In the past few years, the general public has begun embracing the use of more vegan products such as faux fur, in part due to the positive changes it can inflict on the environment.

Faux-fur has its own limitations in the pursuit of being environmentally conscious. Fur farmers have been quick to point out that the production of faux-fur still relies of fossil fuels and harmful materials such as plastics in its production. Currently, technologies dubbed "bio-based fur" are being developed that aim to produce fur exclusively from natural sources and materials. This technology would eliminate many of the current environmental struggles that faux-fur faces.
