= Raymond S. Spears =

American writer

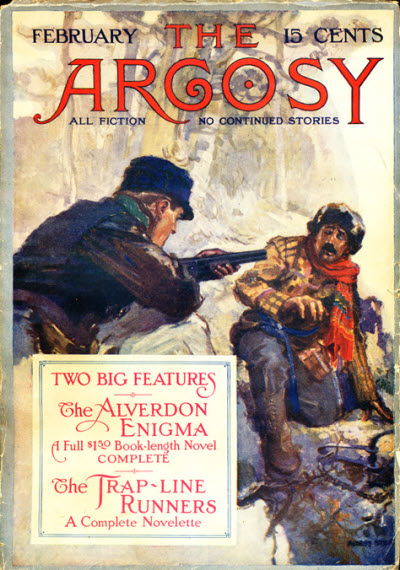
Spears's novella "The Trap-Line Runners" appeared in The Argosy in 1915.

Raymond Smiley Spears (1876–1950) was an author of western and adventure stories. He was born in Belleview, Ohio in 1876, the son of John Randolph Spears (1850–1936), a naval historian, and Celestia Colette Smiley Spears, a teacher. Raymond was educated in Philadelphia, NY. A move to the Adirondack Mountains to recuperate from a throat ailment led to a great love of the outdoors.

Raymond eventually moved to New York City to work as a reporter for The Sun. He worked there for five years before moving back to the countryside and doing freelance reporting. He took several cross-country trips and wrote about them in Forest and Stream. These trips provided the background information for many of his fiction and non-fiction writings.

Raymond used up to eight pseudonyms for his writings, the most used of which was Jim Smiley.

He was the president of the American Trappers' Association during the 1930s.

He married C. Eleanor Shepard in 1904. They had two children, John and Charles. Raymond died in Inglewood, California in 1950.

He wrote 73 stories for Adventure (magazine). Works include:

- 1912:Camping on the Great River
- 1913:Camping on the Great Lakes
- 1913:A Trip on the Great Lakes; Description of a Trip, Summer, 1912
- 1920:Diamond Tolls
- 1920:The River Prophet
- 1921:Driftwood
- 1927:The Flying Coyotes (previously serialized in Argosy magazine)
- Many short stories
