= Fifty Years a Hunter and Trapper =

Book by Eldred Nathaniel Woodcock

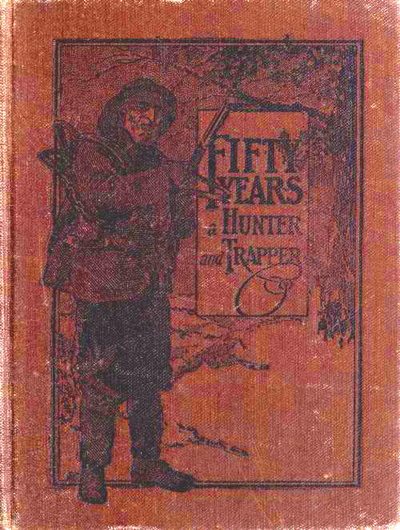
- First edition cover (1913)
- Author: Eldred Nathaniel Woodcock
- Language: English
- Genre: Non-fiction
- Publisher: A. R. Harding Publishing Co.
- Publication date: July 10, 1913 (copyright)
- Publication place: America
- Media type: Print (hardcover)
- Pages: 318 pp

Fifty Years a Hunter and Trapper is an autobiography that contains many experiences and observations of Eldred Nathaniel Woodcock during his fifty years of hunting and trapping.

== Summary ==
One of Harding's Pleasure & Profit Books. A collection of real life outdoor stories based on the experiences of the author, Eldred Nathaniel Woodcock. Writing from memory, Mr. Woodcock tells of incidents that happened during the fifty years (1855–1905) he spent camping, hunting, trapping and fishing in the wilderness of Northern Pennsylvania and several other states.

Most of E. N. Woodcock's stories feature an interesting partner (who he sometimes refers to as "Pard"), and other local people who lived in the Potter County, Pennsylvania area. Many of the wild places where he made his camps are now State Parks and Forests.

E. N. Woodcock tells his stories in plain language, about deer and bear hunting; trapping bear, wild cat, fox, marten, mink and muskrat; run-ins with porcupines and skunks; mishaps that happened to himself and his partners; and the everyday occurrences of camp life. He gives his opinion of state game laws and bounties, and his views on the need for conservation.

The book also includes practical information on building cabins, camp fires and cooking, staying warm, finding bee hives, trap sets, building deadfalls, using baits, skinning, stretching and drying fur, tracking game, and types of guns and ammunition.

== Excerpts and Illustrations ==
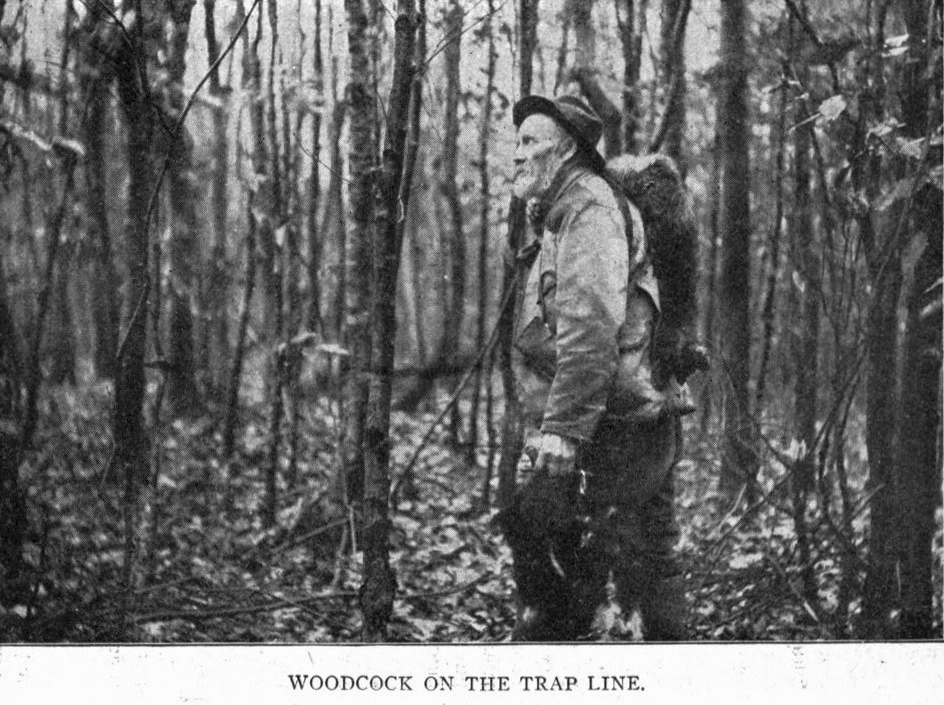
Woodcock on the Trap Line

=== Chapter 15, Hits and Misses on the Trail, page 176 ===
We next crossed a narrow ridge where we had another trap. The trap was set in a spring run and the banks on either side of the run were quite thickly grown up with low brush. Smoky was in advance a few steps so that when he came to the edge of the thick brush that grew on the bank of the run, parted the brush and looked through at the trap, he caught a glimpse of some black object moving in the run. He quickly stepped back and held up his hand, his eyes sparkling with excitement and he whispered to me, "By Moses, we have got him." Smoky being given to much joking, I asked, "What have we got?" for I had not heard any noise of any kind. Smoky said, "A bear, by long horn spoonhandle." I stepped past Smoky and looked through the brush and there was a large black porcupine moving about a little in the trap.

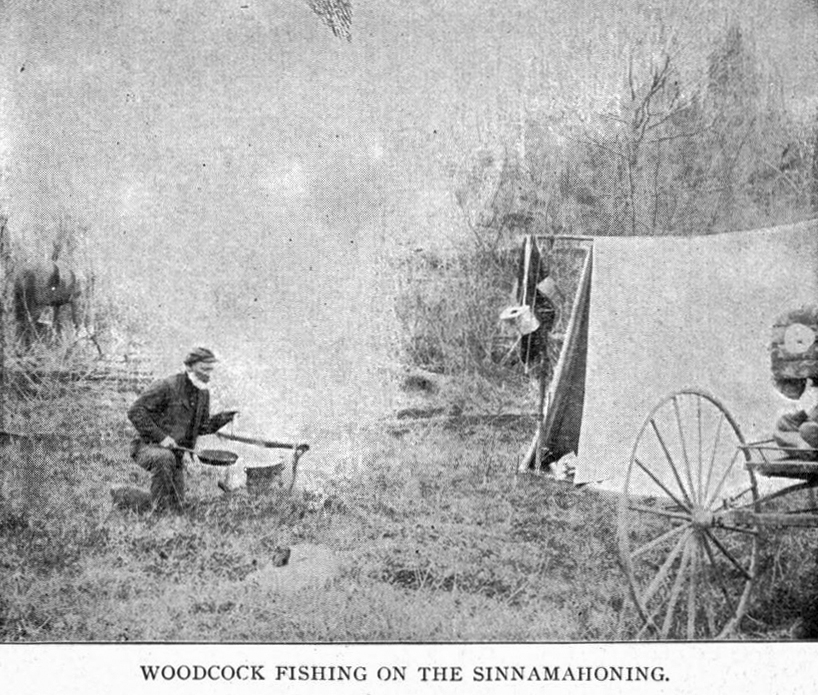
Woodcock Fishing on the Sinnamahoning

I stepped back and said to Smoky, "Well, shoot him." Smoky said, "No, I will miss him. You shoot him," at the same time handing me the gun. I now saw that Smoky was in earnest and surely thought we had a bear and I burst out with laughter. Smoky was amazed and said, "You blooming simpleton, what is the matter with you?" The look of anxiety and the manner in which Smoky spoke still caused me to laugh the harder.

When I could cease laughing long enough to tell Smoky what was in the trap, Smoky's change of looks of excitement and anxiety to one of disgust was pitiful. Smoky began to condemn the country and tell how foolish we were to come to such a forsaken place as that was to trap where there was nothing but porcupines.

== Publication ==
The stories were first published from 1903 to 1913 in Hunter-Trader-Trapper Magazine, and the collection was compiled into book form in 1913, and published by A. R. Harding Publishing Company.

== See also ==
- Arthur Robert Harding
- Potter County, Pennsylvania
- Ole Bull
- Cherry Springs State Park
- Lyman Run State Park
- Black Forest Trail
- Susquehannock State Forest
- Tiadaghton State Forest
- Allegheny National Forest
- Kinzua Creek
