= Eldred Nathaniel Woodcock =

American hunter and writer (1846–1917)

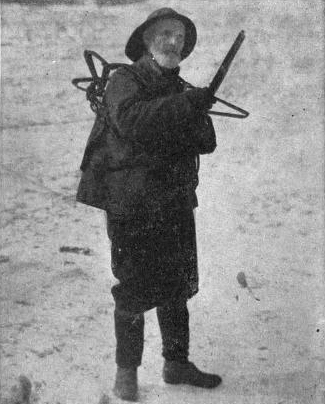
- E. N. Woodcock and bear traps of his own make.
- Born: Eldred Nathaniel Woodcock; 30 August 1846; Lymansville, Potter County, Pennsylvania
- Died: 16 January 1917 (aged 70); Pennsylvania
- Occupations: Trapper, Hunter and Author
- Writing career
- Period: 1855–1905
- Genre: Non-fiction
- Subjects: Historical hunting, trapping and wilderness camping

Eldred Nathaniel Woodcock (1846–1917) was a famous hunter and trapper of Potter County, Pennsylvania. He wrote stories about his life and experiences which were published in the Hunter-Trader-Trapper Magazine between 1903 and 1913. His stories were compiled into a book titled Fifty Years a Hunter and Trapper, and published by A. R. Harding Publishing Company of St. Louis, Missouri in 1913.

== Background ==
Eldred Woodcock was born August 30, 1846, in Lymansville, Potter County, Pennsylvania. His grandfather, Isaac Lyman was a Major in the Revolutionary War.

Lymansville was named after my grandparent, Isaac Lyman, or better known as Major Lyman, having held office of that rank in the Revolutionary War. It is from this limb of the family that I inherited that uncontrollable desire for the trap, gun and the wild.

Eldred's father owned a grist mill and a saw mill that were about one-half mile apart, and Eldred began trapping at a very early age, along the mill races and ponds. He camped, hunted and trapped in a section of Potter County known as The Black Forest, and killed his first bear at the age of thirteen.

Eldred Nathaniel Woodcock died January 15, 1917, and is buried in the Lymansville Cemetery, Potter County, Pennsylvania.

== Books ==
Fifty Years a Hunter and Trapper, published by A. R. Harding, 1913
