= Fur farming =

Practice of breeding or raising animals for their fur

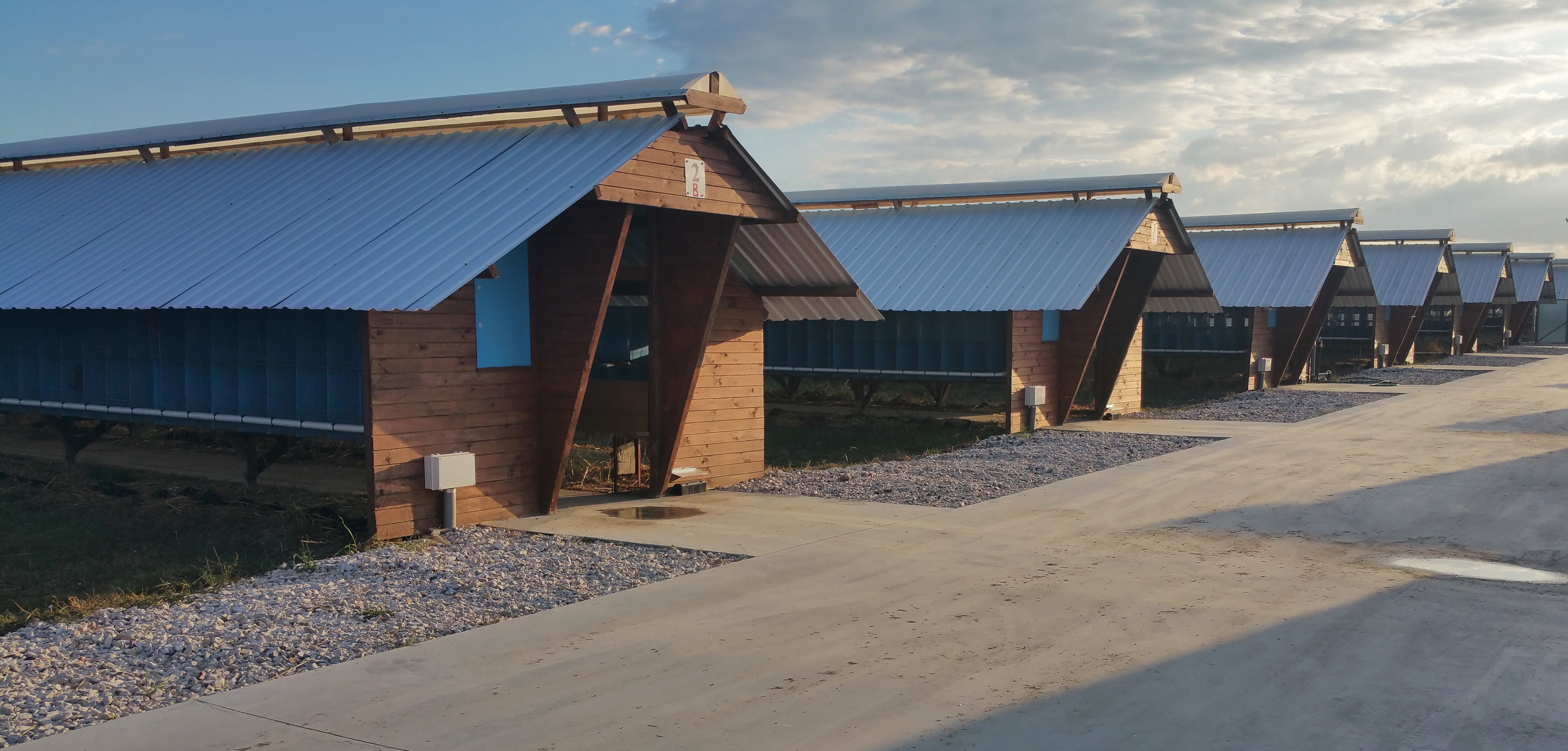
A mink farm in Poland

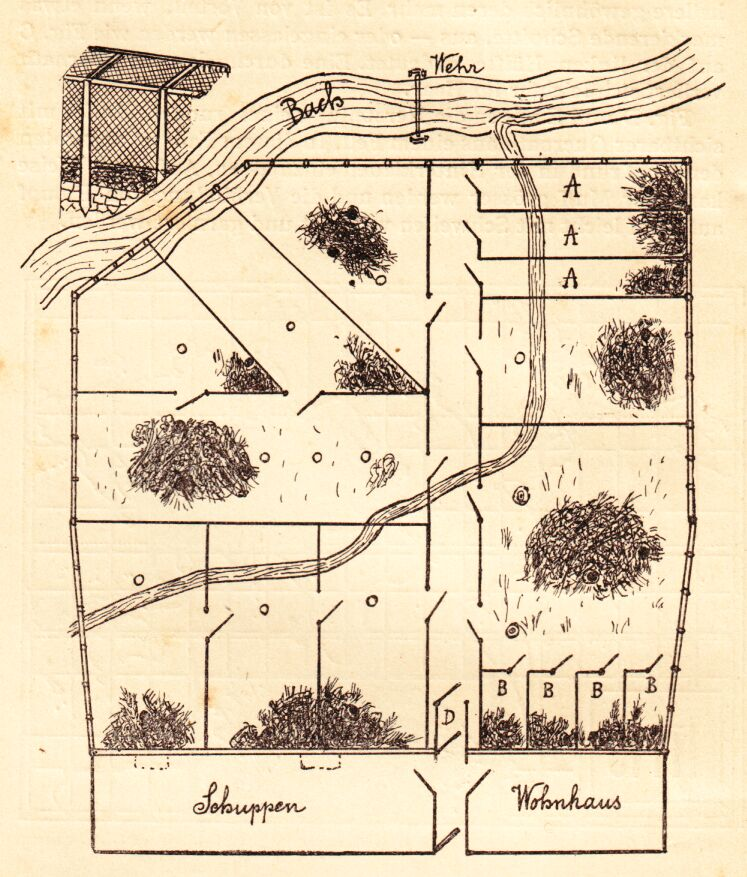
A German plan of a mink farm (after 1900): A = cages for males; B = sections for young animals; D = entrance; O = trees

Fur farming refers to the breeding and raising of certain types of animals for their fur, primarily for their use in clothing and fashion. Production is concentrated in a relatively small number of countries. As of the 21st century, China has become one of the largest producers of farmed fur, while European countries have seen a decline due to regulatory changes.

Most of the world's farmed fur is produced by Chinese and Polish fur-farmers. In 2018, there were 5,000 fur farms in the EU, located across 22 countries; these areas of production collectively accounted for 50% of the global production of farmed fur.

== Legal status per country ==
Which countries have banned fur farming

By 2025 only 6 countries in the EU still farmed animals for fur, and three of these countries had issued a legal ban on the activity, effective within several years. Prior to their banning of fur-farming in 2025, Poland lead the European mink fur-farming industry. Only five countries in Europe still participate in the practice of fur farming, those being Finland, Denmark, Spain, Hungary and Greece. The United States is a major exporter of fur skins. Major export markets include China, Russia, Canada, and the EU. Exports to Asia as a share of total exports grew from 22% in 1998 to 47% in 2002. As of 2012, Russia was reported to be the world's biggest sales market for fur.

Country	Status	Years Effective	Note
United Kingdom	Ban	2000	National Ban
Austria	Ban	2005	Federal law; industry already defunct
Slovenia	Ban	2015	Nationwide Ban
Croatia	Ban	2018	Nationwide Ban
Luxembourg	Ban	2018	Nationwide Ban
Czech Republic	Ban	2019	Nationwide Ban
Netherlands	Ban	2021	Accelerated due to COVID-19
Ireland	Ban	2022	Nationwide Ban
Italy	Ban	2022	Effective June 2022
Malta	Ban	2022	Nationwide Ban
Belgium	Ban	2023	Nationwide Ban
Slovakia	Ban	2025	Nationwide Ban
Norway	Ban	2025	Effective February 2025
Estonia	Ban	2025	Transitional phase-out
Lithuania	Ban	2027	Gradual phase-out
Romania	Ban	2027	Phase-out legislation
Latvia	Ban	2028	Gradual Phase-out
Poland	Ban	2033	Compensation program
Switzerland	De facto ban	-	Strict welfare laws prevent farming
Germany	De facto ban	-	Strict welfare laws prevent farming
Denmark	Ban	2029	Partial ban implemented in 2009 with species-specific restrictions
France	Partial ban	2020	Species specific ban; phase-out ongoing
Hungary	Partial ban	2021	Species specific restrictions
Spain	Planned phase-out	2030	Mink farming targeted
Portugal	No industry		
Cyprus	No industry		
Japan	Industry closed	2016	Last fur farm shut down.

Demand fell in the late 1980s and 1990s as a result of a number of factors, including the efforts of animal rights campaigners and the failure of designers to come up with exciting new lines. Since the turn of the millennium, however, sales worldwide have soared to record highs, fueled by radically new techniques for working with fur, and a sharp rise in disposable income in China and Russia. This growing demand has led to the development of extensive fur farming operations in China and Poland.

During the COVID-19 pandemic, mink turned out to be very susceptible to human–mink infection, sparking fears of widespread outbreaks and mutations in the mink farm populations of many countries that could in turn infect humans with different strains of the coronavirus, making it potentially immune for a COVID-19 vaccine. Several mink farms in the Netherlands have been entirely culled since June 2020, and in August 2020 the phaseout of fur farming was accelerated from 1 January 2024 to 1 March 2021. In July 2020, Spain culled 100,000 mink. On 6 November 2020, Denmark announced it would cull its entire 17 million mink population as an emergency measure to prevent the spread of a mutated strain of COVID-19, of which at least five cases were found. On 11 November, the Netherlands again moved the phase-out forward, now putting 1 January 2021 as the target date to limit the risk of mutation. Kopenhagen Fur (accounting for 40% of mink production worldwide) announced mid-November it would gradually cease operations in 2–3 years because the circumstances had critically undermined the future of the global fur trade. COVID-19 and other illnesses continue to threaten the fur farming industry, and the fur farming trade itself is a part of a larger discussion on the potential for yet another pandemic.

Fur farming has faced criticism and increasing regulatory pressure due to animal welfare concerns. The recent 'Fur Free Europe' European Citizens' Initiative (ECI) gathered over 1.5 million validated signatures urging the EU to ban fur farming and the sale of farmed fur products. In response to the ECI, the European Commission tasked the European Food Safety Authority (EFSA) to provide an independent scientific opinion on the welfare of animals farmed for fur. The EFSA scientific opinion was published in July 2025 and concluded that the current cage systems of fur farming cannot meet the behavioral or welfare needs of mink, foxes, raccoon dogs and chinchilla.

== History ==
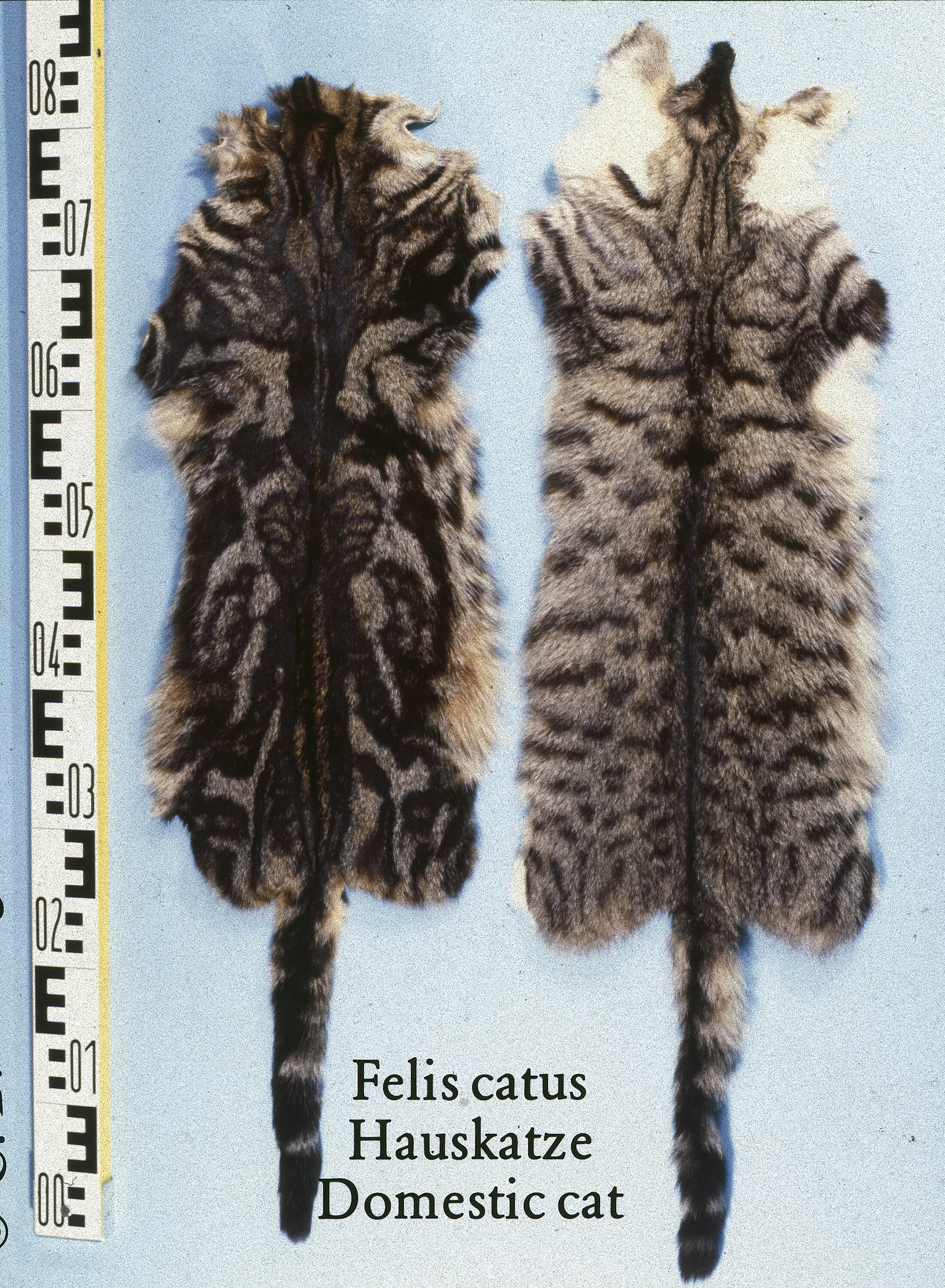
Cat skins

While wearing fur clothing in cold weather as protection goes back to the Stone Age, the source for this material came from the wild. As human populations grew, furs, leathers, and hides for use in clothing came from farm stock, such as sheep (sheepskin), rabbits, cattle, pigs, and goats. Archaeologists have discovered evidence of red fox breeding in the late Iron Age on Orkney, off the northern coast of Scotland. After the attack of the Vikings in Scotland around 800 CE, the breeding is said to have stopped. The earliest records of breeding mink for fur in North America were in the 1860s. Foxes were first raised on farms for fur in Prince Edward Island in Canada in 1895.

Historically, the fur trade played an important economic role in the United States. Fur trappers explored and opened up large parts of North America, and the fashion for beaver hats led to intense competition for the raw materials. Starting in the latter half of the 20th century, producers and wearers of fur have been criticized by animal rights activists because of the cruelty involved in animal trapping, and because of the widespread availability of inexpensive substitutes including natural fibers (such as cotton, hemp) as well as synthetic fibers. In 1991, New York Times journalist John F. Burns described the American fur industry as "shrinking with no end in sight."

Today, 85 percent of the fur clothing industry's pelts come from animals raised on farms. The rest is from animals caught in the wild. The most farmed fur-bearing animal is the mink (50 million annually), followed by the fox (about 4 million annually). Asiatic and Finnish raccoon and chinchilla are also farmed for their fur. As of 2008, 64 percent of fur farms were in Northern Europe, 11 percent in North America, and the rest were dispersed throughout the world, in countries such as Argentina and Russia.

== Species ==
=== Mink ===
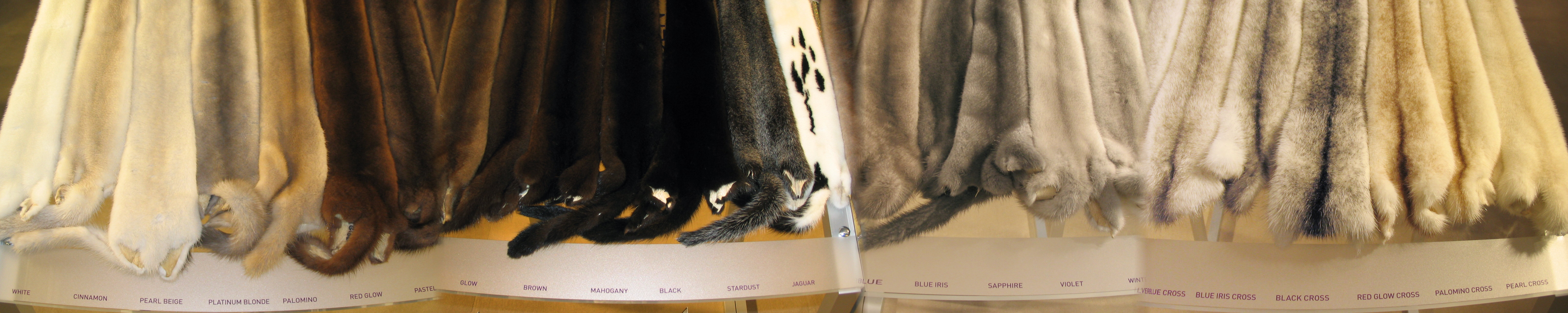
Mink colours

Mink have been farmed for fur in the United States for 130 years, though domestic demand for fur started to decline rapidly by the late 1980s. In 2010, the U.S. ranked fifth in production behind Denmark, China, the Netherlands, and Poland. Mink typically breed in March and give birth to their litters in May. Farmers vaccinate the young kits for botulism, distemper, enteritis, and, if needed, pneumonia. They are slaughtered in November and December. Methods for euthanizing animals on fur farms, as on all farms, are detailed in the American Veterinary Medical Association's Report on Euthanasia which is used as a guideline for state departments of agriculture which have jurisdiction over all farms raising domesticated livestock, including mink.

The white mink, a northern European breed, was introduced into Canada in 1968. Most mink production in Canada occurs in Nova Scotia which, with 116 licensed farms in 2016, generated revenues of nearly $54 million by contributing approximately 1.4 million pelts to global markets. That accounted for an average of half of all Canada's mink pelts. Production of black mink in particular has grown significantly since 2000, with emerging markets in Russia, China, and South Korea accounting for most of the new demand. Black mink was first bred in Nova Scotia in the late 1950s and has proven popular as a versatile colour.

=== Chinchilla ===
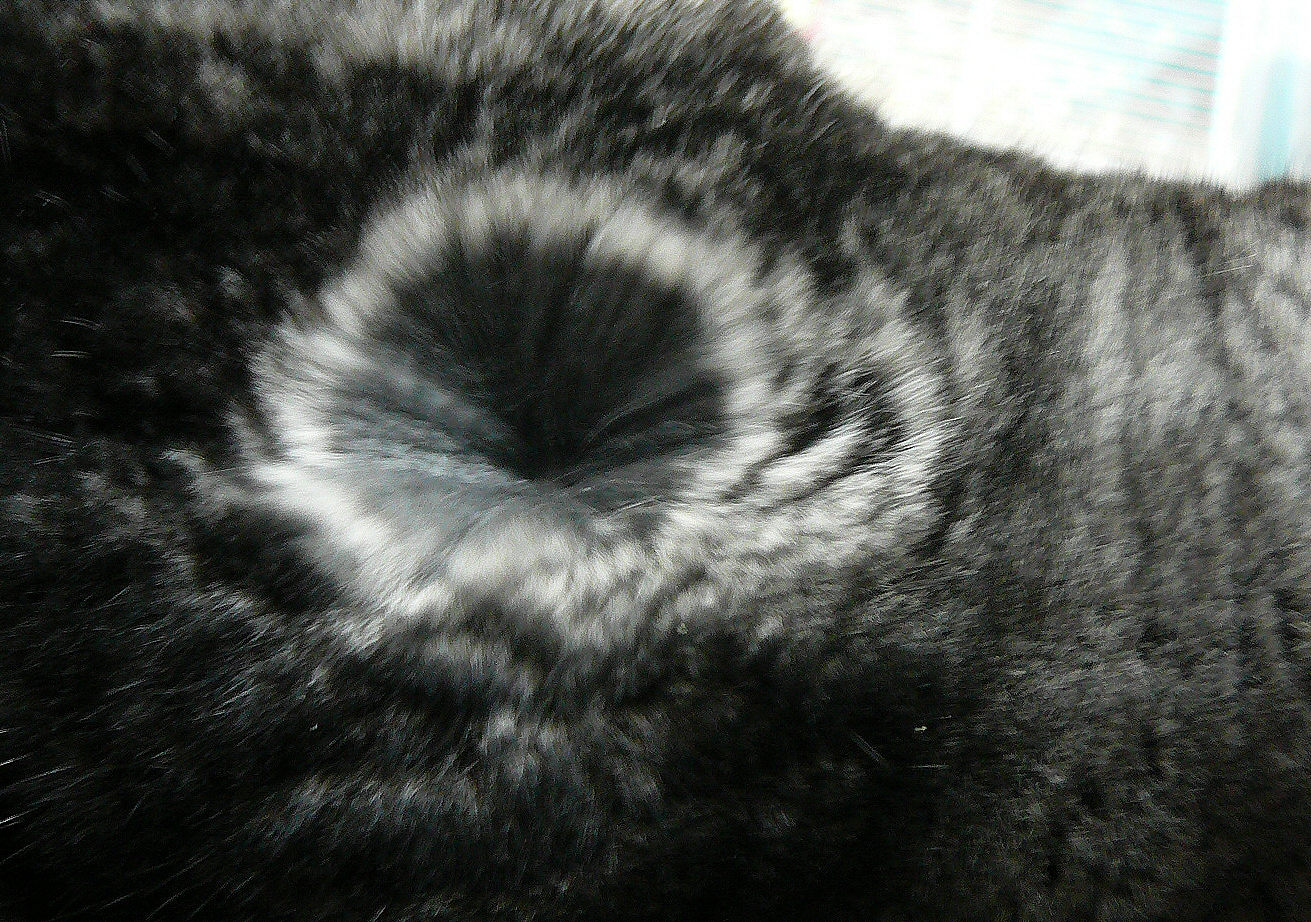
The density of a chinchilla’s coat

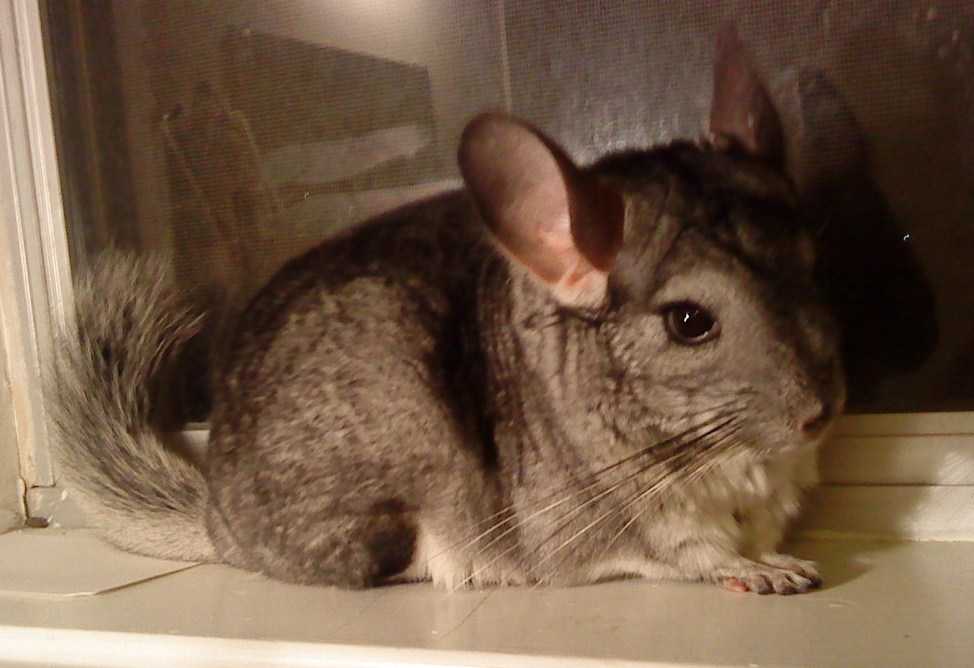
A two-year-old standard gray female chinchilla

The international trade in chinchilla fur goes back to the 16th century and the animal (whose name literally means "Little Chincha") is named after the Chincha people of the Andes, who wore its soft, dense fur. By the end of the 19th century, chinchillas had become quite rare. In 1923, Mathias F. Chapman brought the eleven wild chinchillas he had captured to the U.S. for breeding. Only three of these were female. Empress Chinchilla is the breeders association for the chinchilla farmers, many of whom are based in the United States, including California. Empress Chinchilla runs a certification program for farmers..

=== Fox ===
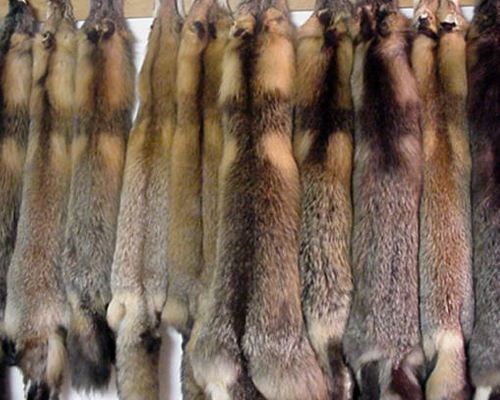
"Cross fox" furs. The cross across the shoulders is a common red fox marking.

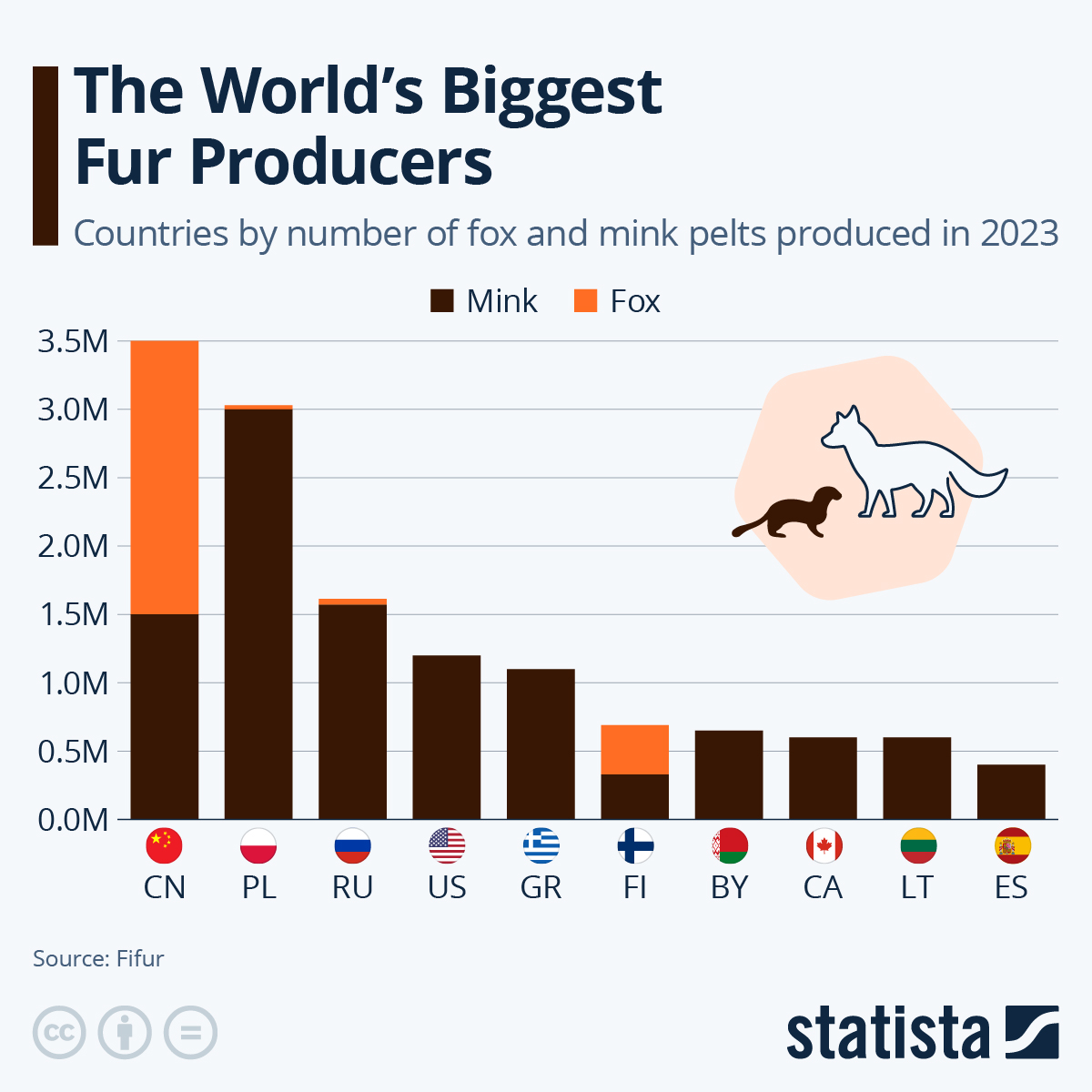
The Worlds Biggest Fur Producers (2023)

In 2024 China was the largest producer of fox furs producing 4,050,000 pelts, while Finland was second with 303,000. Currently, there are 600 fur farms still operational in Finland, 90% of which are in Ostrobothnia. In the United States, fox production is about 10,000 pelts, produced in about 10 states. Farmed foxes are typically bred for fur quality, body size, and specific color traits. The most common species are the red fox (Vulpes vulpes) and the Arctic fox (Vulpes lagopus).

=== Dog and cat ===
The trade in dog and cat fur is prohibited in several major markets. In the United States, the Dog and Cat Protection Act of 2000 banned the import, export, and sale of products made from dog and cat fur in 2000. Italy, France, Denmark, Greece, Belgium, and Australia have likewise banned the import of domestic cat and dog fur but the sale is still quasi-legal. In most countries, novelty items made from farmed cat and dog fur is available in the form of animal toys or as trim on garments like boots, jackets and handbags. The European Union banned imports in 2009. Regulation (EC) No 1523/2007 prohibits the placing of cat and dog fur on the market, as well products containing cat and dog fur. The regulation took effect in 2008 and applies across all member states.

=== Rabbit ===
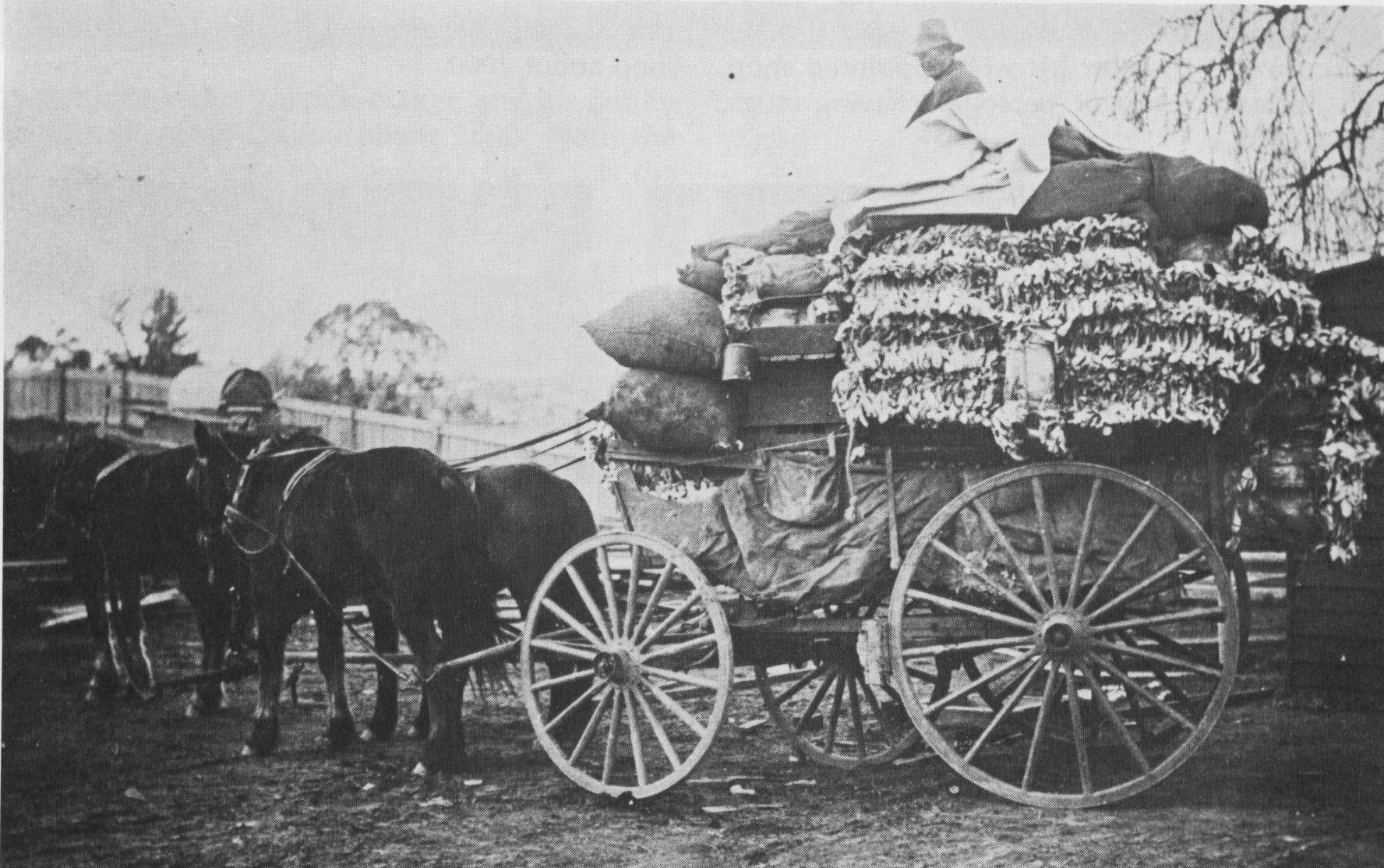
A load of rabbit skins (c. 1905)

The main breed in the rabbit fur farming industry is the Rex (Castor Rex and Chinchilla Rex). Breeding animals are kept for up to three years, and usually give birth twice a year. The kits are taken from their mothers at 4 weeks old and put in a nursery with other kits. After this, the mothers are kept separated from their kits, and they get put together only for feeding. When the kits are 7 to 8 weeks old, they are put in solitary cages, where they are kept for about 6–7 months, and are slaughtered after they have shed their winter fur. The rabbits are kept in bare wire mesh cages. A cage for one rabbit has the floor space of about two shoe boxes. The mortality rate for caged Rex is 10–15%, mostly from respiratory disease.

== Farmed mink production cycle ==
=== Conditioning and breeding (December – March) ===
During this time of year, ranchers are primarily focused on bringing their selected mink into a good condition that is suitable for breeding. Mink are a monoestrous species that undergo delayed implantation when bred successfully, this means that the breeding season can be the most strenuous time of year both in terms of animal nutrition and human labor. It is essential that management practices employ a feeding program that maintains a nutritional diet that is adequate for both male and female mink. A feeding program that encourages the removal of excess weight and an environment that facilitates an increase in exercise is important for good production and a successful whelp. Mink are usually fed once or twice a day during the growing season; on most farms they are fed the same quantity of food on all cages and close to an ad libitum amount so that 50% of all cages have feed left over the next day. In addition to fur quality and production traits, breeder selection should concentrate on health and temperament (21) to improve the welfare of the herd.

Breeding records are kept for each individual mink, this includes information on the dates of mating, genetics involving family lineage, reproductive success, health status, and fur characteristics.

=== Whelping and weaning (April – June) ===
In preparation for whelping, comfortable conditions are prepared for the female by providing ample aspen bedding in which she can create a nest. It is well known that female mink are highly motivated to perform maternal-related nest building during the majority of their gestation period, this is why providing an abundance of substrate to prepare a nest is crucial to maintain the animals welfare. Unnecessary stress and noises should be avoided so due to the sensitivity of female mink during late gestation. Gestation varies from 40 to 70 days, this time is often shortened by extending the daylight period by use of artificial lighting.

Females give birth to 5–6 kits on average. Since kits are born altricial, the female spends most of her time in the nest boxes caring for them. Mink kits are fully dependent on the dam's milk and will nurse for the first four weeks of their life. Maternal care is essential to promote offspring survival and growth, particularly in American mink who give birth to altricial young. Ranchers should check them regularly to ensure all the kits are warm, receiving enough milk, and are growing well. Females can lose significant body condition during lactation so their health is monitored by visual observations of behavior, appearance, and feed consumption. Weaning takes place when the kits reach approximately 6–8 weeks old. The changes that take place during weaning can be stressful for both dam and kits therefore is done at a time that is most beneficial for the mother and litter. Ranchers should ensure the kits are able to consume solid feed and drink water independently before they are ready for weaning.

=== Growth and furring (July – October) ===
Very rapid growth takes place during the growth phase of the production cycle. For about 10–11 weeks, it is critical that the juvenile kits have access to adequate amounts of feed that is formulated to meet their nutritional needs. Maintaining a feeding routine that allows for multiple distributions of feed a day will help keep feed fresh and encourage appetite. In July, all mink (including kits and adult breeders) are vaccinated to prevent diseases and promote health and welfare of the herd. Once August arrives, the skeletal growth of kits is complete and the subsequent growth of primarily fat begins. The growth of fur predominantly takes place during the fall where it begins at the tail and continues up the back and to the head. Ranchers maintain a clean, healthy environment during this time by performing daily husbandry practices, this includes; cleaning nest boxes, removal of surrounding debris and manure from the barn, bedding the cages, and up-keeping the cleanliness of the facility and farming equipment. Ranchers are diligent toward creating an environment that prioritizes the welfare of each animal and allows them to live and function comfortably within their environment.

=== Grading and slaughter (November – December) ===
Mink are carefully evaluated in November or early December in order to physically assess their coat color, characteristics, and quality. Fur quality, along with skin size are two of the most important traits that are under intense selection in most mink breeding programs. Each mink will be given a grade dictated by the attributes of their coat; this is valuable in determining which mink will be kept as breeding stock for next season. Fur quality, color, and body size are judged by the farmer or a professional grader. Fur grades are often used alongside size, weight, health history, parent reproductive success, litter size, and temperament to assess the quality and potential of each animal.

The methods used to slaughter mink include neck breaking, electricity, carbon monoxide, carbon dioxide, nitrogen, argon, and lethal injection. The most common method of slaughter is by subjecting the animal to a chamber that contains carbon monoxide. Pelting takes place either on site or upon shipping the mink to an offsite operation.

== By-products ==
After pelting, mink bodies are typically sent for rendering where they can be converted into bone and meat meal. The meat from most fur-bearers is not usually eaten by humans, therefore the carcasses will go on to become various products such as pet food, animal feed, organic compost, fertilizer, paint, and even tires. Carcasses sometimes go to animal sanctuaries, zoos, and aquariums to feed animals, and some end up as crab bait. Some biological supply companies offer preserved skinned carcasses of ranched mink for classroom dissection specimens as an alternative to cats or other domesticated mammals. Mink feces are used as organic crop fertiliser, and mink fat is turned into oil to manufacture soap, face oils, cosmetics, and leather treatments.

== By country ==
Methods used on fur farms to maximize profits are employed at the expense of the welfare of fur producing animals, though the exact scope of cruelty in the industry is hotly debated. As with other types of animal farming, living conditions of animals vary, and extreme cases are of much contention. According to PETA, the majority of fur farmers pack animals into small cages, preventing them from taking more than a few steps back and forth. PETA claims foxes and other animals suffer as a result of the confined environment, and may even cannibalize each other as a reaction to their confinement. Animal rights groups have also released videos showing cruel treatment of Angora rabbits to obtain their fur. In other cases, as with passing of animal welfare legislation in Italy, animals are required to be given enriched living environments in which they can climb on branches, dig holes, use a nest of 50 × 50 cm and also have a water basin of at least 2 × 2 metres and 50 cm deep in which to swim. Farmers argue that 50 years ago, the animals were kept in large outdoor holding areas, with pools of water. However, such farms resulted in high disease rates for the animals and were not practical. Farmers claim that today's farmed animals only know farm life as they have been domesticated through over 100 of years of selective breeding. The methods used for slaughtering the animals on farms and in the wild vary depending on the animal. For farmed mink, the American Veterinary Medical Association researches the best methods and publishes a report on the subject every 7 to 10 years. This report is used to guide state departments of agriculture which have jurisdiction over farm animals, including farm-raised mink. For those harvesting wild furs, biologists and wildlife managers dictate seasons, method of slaughter, and numbers of animals to be harvested.

=== Austria ===
Fur farming in Austria ended before the introduction of a nationwide ban, with the last fur farm closing in November of 1998. In 2000, the Austrian fur chain "Kleider Bauer" with some 50 outlets agreed that by 2007, they would cease selling furs after being approached by activists. Retailers Zara and Schops were also approached and agreed to end fur-sales by the end of the year. Prior to the federal legislation, several Austrian states had already restricted or banned fur trading. Six of the nine federal states have banned fur farming, and the remaining three enforce such strict welfare regulations, in relation to the availability of swimming water, that fur farming is no longer economically viable. As of March 11th, 2026, Austria has begun pushing for an EU-wide ban on fur farming along with a similar ban against imports of fur from outside of the bloc. Austria also notes that the industry has been unprofitable for several years, producing €183 million in 2024.

=== Canada ===
==== Quebec ====
In 2014, for the first time in Canadian history, a Quebec fur farmer by the name of Jean-Luc Rodier was charged with animal cruelty following an investigation by the Society for the Prevention of Cruelty to Animals (S.P.C.A.). Fox and mink at the fur farm were seized by animal welfare organizations and some were in such poor condition that they had to be euthanized. Following the S.P.C.A. investigation, this Quebec fur farm was raided by anonymous activists who set free thousands of animals.

==== British Columbia ====
Video footage taken at fur farms in 2014 in British Columbia by the A.P.F.A. was described by the S.P.C.A. as "inherently inhumane". Animal rights activists in the city of Vancouver have been using legal and illegal actions to protest selling fur such as vandalism, home demonstrations of fur shop owners, and organizing public protests.

==== Ontario ====
Canadian fur farms in the Province of Ontario have been repeatedly targeted by the Animal Liberation Front (ALF). Thousands of mink were freed from farms across the province during 2013 and 2015. The mink breeders association of Ontario responded by offering a hundred thousand dollar bounty leading to a conviction of the persons responsible. Undercover footage was also released by the ALF in 2015 of several Ontario area mink farms, showcasing injured animals and mink cages covered in feces and maggots. Animal rights organizations across the province have taken a wide array of actions to stop the fur trade, such as public protests and disruptions of fur fashion shows.

=== China ===
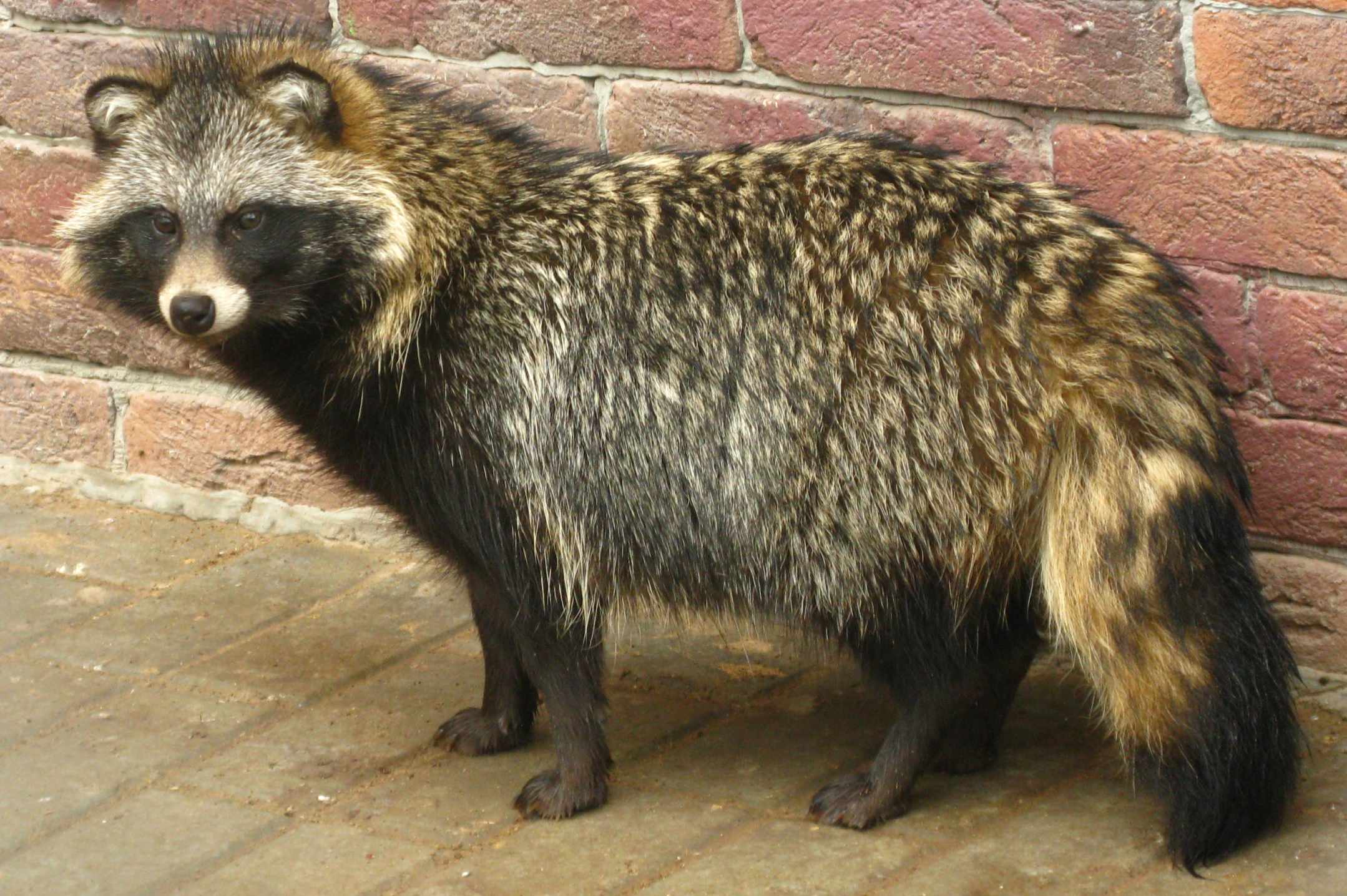
Raccoon dog (Nyctereutes procyonoides)

In 2005, animals rights group The Swiss Animal Protection produced a video alleging that fur-bearing animals – including the "Asiatic raccoon" (raccoon dog) – were being skinned while still alive in Shangcun Market. The China Fur Commission and China Leather Industry Association challenged the authenticity of the video, stating: "Pictures showing animals being skinned alive are obviously plotted. All those with common sense would not choose this slaughter method to attain fur." The government of Suning County, Hebei Province also issued a statement, outlining welfare practices it claimed to practice on its fur farms and calling the alleged practice of skinning animals alive "unimaginable." Swiss Animal Protection then published a video which was reposted by PETA in 2009 showing the skinning of raccoon dogs. The video showed an Asiatic raccoon dog being beaten and then skinned, while still breathing. The International Fur Federation found the two fur workers who had appeared in the 2009 video and through interviews as well as affidavits, alleged that two unidentified antifur investigators approached them with monetary offers if they agreed to skin an animal alive. A 2018 Shanghaiist article noted that although it was more than likely some animals had been skinned alive in China, to extrapolate that all or most of the farms did this was wrong.

In 2006, the State Forestry Administration (SFA) announced it was planning to offer training courses for fur farmers to improve the living conditions of fur animals. Legislation was drafted in September 2009 to address any cruelty to animals in China. If passed, the legislation would regulate how farm animals are raised, transported, and slaughtered.

Video footage released by Humane Society International in 2015 and 2023 found that slaughter methods varied for foxes and mink on Chinese farms, with most being killed by electrocution while some foxes were beaten on the head or neck. The electrocution tool shown in the 2015 video failed to stun some of the foxes, causing them severe pain instead. Rabbits were killed for their fur in one Northern Chinese slaughter facility by being hit on the head as an attempt to render them unconscious before being slit in the throat. Data from China’s Fur and Leather Industry Association showed a 50% drop in the country’s fur production from 2022 to 2023 and a drop of almost 90% from 2014 to 2023; HSI attributed this decline to numerous farms having closed because of poor sales.

=== Estonia ===
Estonian citizens have a partial right to submit initiatives with at least 1000 signatures to the parliament since 2014. They do not directly go to the parliamentary hall but go through a process of review in a subject commission. On 21 November 2014, the Estonian animal advocacy organization Loomus submitted a petition to ban fur farming in the country with a 10-year transition period with 10 000 signatures to the parliament. This was preceded by secretly filmed anonymous documentary footage being aired both online via YouTube and on Estonian National Television depicting the conditions of the animals in 2012 (aired 2013) and 2014. The Estonian animal advocacy organization Loomus issued a comment after the airings of Estonian Public Broadcasting outlining the documented disregard animal welfare regulations and pointing out the numerous injuries of animals that were documented.

The petition has since been under review in the commission of agricultural affairs. The commission procured a study on the economic significance of the industry from the Estonian University of Life Sciences published in 2016, which did not state the exact number of farms in existence but did outline that the mink and fox farms employed 74 full-time workers in 2014, with the majority concentrated in the largest factory in the Baltic States, in Karjaküla, near Tallinn. It also reported the chinchilla farms employed 20.5 full-time workers in 2014. The activists have voiced their concern about the bias inherent in the study, which according to them by and large ignored ethical and environmental arguments, as a number of the experts in the study panel were found to have direct links to and vested interests in the fur industry. The commission is expected to formulate their opinion and vote whether the petition would move on to a law drafting phase and public discussion in the full quorum of the parliament in the fall of 2016.

On 22 August 2016, activists launched an additional international petition inviting the Estonian Parliament to ban fur farming in the country at change.org.

Estonian parliament banned fur farms on 2 June 2021. There is a transitional period that permits keeping mink and raccoon dogs in farms until the end of 2025 if the permit was issued before 1 July 2021.

=== Finland ===
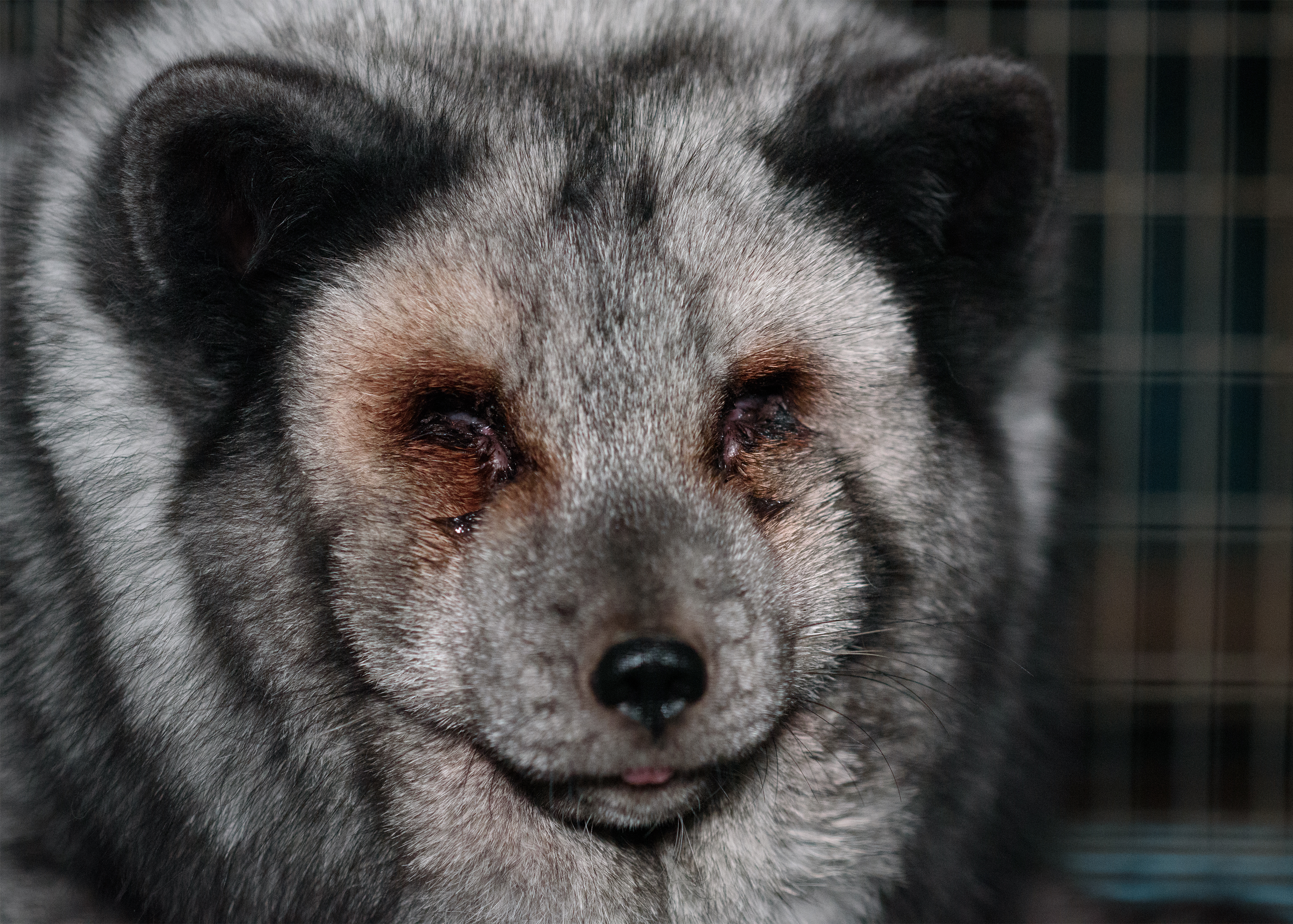
An ill fur animal in Finland in 2018

Finnish citizens have had a right to instigate parliamentarian law initiatives since 2012. The first citizens' initiative to gain enough signatures was that instituting a ban on fur farming. Some 70,000 citizens signed the initiative within the required time period in 2013. In a march to Parliament House, Helsinki on 18 June., four to five hundred people appealed to members of parliament to approve the citizens' initiative to ban fur farming. According to animal expert MSc Sesse Koivisto (wife of Ilkka Koivisto ex-director of the Korkeasaari Zoo) in Helsingin Sanomat in 2010, fur farming did not provide acceptable conditions for the animals. In order to stop the suffering of animals, she demanded a ban on fur farming in Helsingin Sanomat, as in some other countries. On 19 June 2013, the Finnish Parliament rejected the first citizens' initiative to ban fur farming. A positive development in the politics of Finland was that the initiative was taken in the Parliament for public voting.

In Finland in August 2016, there were about 950 active fur farms. The breeding of fur-animals has had a long tradition in Finland, having been professionally conducted since the 1920s. Up to 90% of the fur-farming community is situated in the rural areas of Ostrobothnia and employs four to six thousand people. Today, fur farming is strictly regulated by law. The Finnish Furbreeders Association has developed its own national program of certification and animal health welfare that is tied to the ISO 9001 standard and monitored by the Det Norske Veritas. The fur animals are housed in shelter buildings or halls, where each animal has a specific place marked with a kit card. The Humane Society of the United States published videos in 2019 and 2021 showing minks with untreated wounds along with foxes with allegedly deformed feet, missing ears, or diseased eyes on the farms.

The first high-profile attacks by animal activists in Finland took place in 1995 in Nykarleby and Evijärvi, when around 400 foxes were released from four fur farms. Three young women – Kirsi Kultalahti, Mia Salli and Minna Salonen – were later convicted of the incident, with two of them receiving 12-month and one nine-month suspended sentences. They were also ordered to pay FIM 800,000 in damages. The perpetrators of the attack were called "fox girls" (kettutytöt) in the media. Another high-profile incident took place in Orimattila in 1997, when a fur farmer shot five people who had trespassed on his farm with a shotgun. On 22 September 2003, the largest farm raid ever in Finland was carried out: approximately 8,000 minks were released into the wild in Lahnakoski, Kokkola. The case remained unsolved, although the police had suspicions about the perpetrators.

=== France ===
On 29 September 2020, Environment Minister Barbara Pompili announced that France's four remaining mink farms would be closed within the next 5 years.

=== Lithuania ===
On 21 September 2023, Lithuanian parliament Seimas adopted a law banning fur farming by 2027. Owners of fur farms will be compensated, but the size of the compensations has been the subject of complaints from the business community. They will be paid 3 euros per animal in the first year, 2 euros per animal in the second year and one euro in the final year. The government will also compensate redundancy payments for farm workers and cover costs related to the demolition of buildings, the destruction of equipment and waste management.

=== Iceland ===
Iceland's fur farming industry has rapidly declined over the past decade, from a peak of 43 fur farms in 2013 to just one fur farm remaining operational as of 2026.

The Icelandic government is facing pressure to ban fur farming following an undercover investigation in November 2025 that exposed widespread animal welfare violations at three fur farms. These farms have subsequently closed down due to financial reasons, but a Freedom of Information request to Iceland's veterinary authority suggests there are similar animal welfare concerns at Iceland's remaining operational fur farm.

The recent investigation into animal welfare violations at Icelandic fur farms has prompted Iceland Fashion Week to announce a fur-free policy, aligning with major fashion weeks in Copenhagen, London and New York City.

=== Ireland ===
In Ireland there were three fur farms in operation as of August 2014. These farms focused mainly on the trade of mink fur (some farms which previously used fox fur were winding down operation as such trade is no longer economically viable). In 2006, approximately 170,000 mink and 300 foxes were harvested in Ireland. Furs were exported from Ireland to other EU member states or to countries in Asia and North America. In Ireland, fur farms were monitored by the Department of Agriculture, and welfare standards of Ireland and the European Union were required to be adhered to at all times.

In October 2009, there were discussions within the political sphere on the banning of fur farms in Ireland. Animal welfare groups welcomed such proposals, though concern was highlighted, in terms of its impact on rural communities where alternative industries are scarce. Fur farming in Ireland contributed about €15 million per year to the economy as of 2014. A ban was subsequently passed before being overturned by Minister for Agriculture at the time Simon Coveney of Fine Gael after the party formed a new government following the 2011 election.

A renewed campaign and efforts to push the Irish government or current Minister for Agriculture Michael Creed to re-implement a phase-out ban took place from 2018 to 2019. Following the introduction of the Solidarity party's 'Prohibition of Fur Farming Bill 2018', the government gave in to political and public pressure and agreed conclusively through Minister Creed to implement a phase-out ban on fur farming in Ireland with the finer details to be announced afterwards.

Legislation banning fur farming in Ireland was brought into force on 4 April 2022, resulting in the closure of Ireland's three remaining fur farms.

=== Netherlands ===
Fur farming of chinchillas and foxes is banned. Legislation to phase out mink fur farming (and thereby effectively all fur farming) by 2024 was approved by the end of 2012.

=== Russia ===
PETA published a video in 2019 alleging that animals were "still suffering terribly" in Russian fur farms, with slaughter methods involving beating, decapitation while conscious, and prolonged electrocution.

=== Spain ===
In July 2020, Spain culled 100,000 mink after a farm in the Aragon province was infected with COVID-19.

=== Sweden ===
As of November 2020, there were about 35 to 40 mink farms in Sweden, 10 of which had been infected with COVID-19. The government was not planning any culling as of 9 November 2020, but animal rights group Djurens Rätt was advocating for one in order to minimise the risk of a mutation that could compromise a COVID-19 vaccine.

=== United Kingdom ===
After a long campaign of daily protests, an act of parliament was introduced to ban the farming of animals for their fur. Fur farmers were given compensation in England and Wales in 2000. At second reading, the ban in England and Wales was justified principally on grounds of public morality. Prior to the ban, there had been 11 fur farms in the UK producing about 100,000 pelts annually. Respect for Animals Campaign director Mark Glover said at the time: "To keep animals in such conditions in the name of fashion is totally unacceptable in a civilised society."

"We're the first country to introduce a national ban. It is a massive victory for us."

The Bill honoured Labour's pre-election pledge to end fur factory farming. Although the last fur farm in Scotland had closed in 1993, the Scottish Parliament nevertheless banned fur farming in 2002. Fur farming was also banned in Northern Ireland in 2002 under the Fur Farming (Prohibition) (Northern Ireland) Order 2002.

According to Corporate Watch in 2019 the UK was importing more than £55m worth of fur, including £5.3m from China.

In August 2022 an animal rights campaign group "Shut Down T&S Rabbits" succeeded in closing down a network of rabbit meat and fur farms across the East Midlands region.

In October 2024 a Private Member's Bill to prohibit the import and sale of fur was presented to Parliament. The proposed import ban aligns with the recent report of the UK Animal Welfare Committee (AWC), an independent advisory body to Defra, which concluded that current industry standards or safeguards are inadequate to meet the welfare needs of animals used in fur production.

== Pandemic risk ==
In a 2023 editorial for PNAS, scholars in the Department of Infectious Disease at Imperial College London argued that "mink, more so than any other farmed species, pose a risk for the emergence of future disease outbreaks and the evolution of future pandemics."

=== Denmark ===
On 6 November 2020, Denmark announced it would cull its entire 17 million mink population, divided over more than 1,000 Danish mink farms, as an emergency measure to prevent the spread of a mutated strain of COVID-19, of which at least five cases were found. By 9 November, more than 200 people have been infected with mink-related coronavirus, while 7 out of the 11 municipalities of the North Jutland Region were put under a strict lockdown from 6 November until at least 3 December to contain the spread. On 10 November, the process was put on hold due to political opposition, which argued that there was not enough scientific evidence yet whether the new virus variant was dangerous and thus whether the culling was necessary, given the loss of livelihood for fur farmers it would result in. By then, 2.5 million of its estimated 15 to 17 million mink population had already been culled. A Danish fur farmer interests association agreed that the culling should take place eventually, but that an agreement on proper compensation of the farmers should be reached beforehand. Meanwhile, it had been discovered that the North Jutland Region lockdown had been insufficient, as the mutated coronavirus had already spread to hundreds of mink farms elsewhere in Denmark. Although the Danish government halted the mandatory culling in mid-November, it still recommended culling, which continued on a voluntary basis. Industry group Kopenhagen Fur (accounting for 40% of mink production worldwide) announced it would gradually cease operations in 2–3 years because the circumstances had critically undermined the future of the global fur trade. An ECDC risk report warned that the Danish mink-mutated coronavirus, called Cluster 5, was a danger that had to be controlled, although the gravity was not yet fully understood. Leading American virologist Anthony Fauci downplayed the risk posed by Cluster 5.

=== Netherlands ===
During the COVID-19 pandemic in the Netherlands, by 25 May 2020 there were two cases where minks had infected humans with an apparently mutated form of the virus. There was high political pressure on the Agriculture Minister Carola Schouten to immediately cull all minks to prevent spreading this new version to humans. On 26 May, Schouten decided to wait for the veterinary epidemiological research report of 29 May, and said culling was only to be employed as a 'last resort'. Demands to execute all minks immediately, to prevent a fur farm from restarting operations after having been culled due to COVID-19 infections, and to phase out fur farming earlier than the agreed date of 1 January 2024, were all rejected by the minister as legally impossible. After the testing report was completed, Minister Schouten in early June that 10 mink farms in Brabant and Limburg had to be culled to prevent the spread of the coronavirus. An objection from two animal activist groups was overruled by the court. On 6 June 2020 the culling of around 1,500 mother minks with about 4 to 5 pups each at a farm in Deurne was commenced, later 9 others would follow in Milheeze (two), De Mortel, Elsendorp, Beek en Donk, Deurne, Landhorst and Venray. On 27 August 2020, the government decided to move the definitive prohibition on fur farming forward to 1 March 2021. This decision was taken on the advice of the Outbreak Management Team (OMT) when more and more of the around 130 remaining mink farms were infected by COVID-19, necessitating containment of the spread and a clear perspective for a sector that, by then, had lost its economic viability and political support.

On 11 November, the Dutch government, on the advice of the OMT, decided to bring forward the phase-out again in order to limit the risk of mutation, with 1 January 2021 as the new target date. At that time, more than half of all mink farms had already been infected and culled, while preventive culling of not yet infected farms was in full swing to minimise the danger.

=== United States ===
The Centers for Disease Control and Prevention (CDC) stated on 4 November 2020 that there were 11 mink farms in the United States that had been infected with COVID-19, including in the states of Utah, Wisconsin and Michigan. At least 8,000 mink had died due to the coronavirus at multiple farms in Utah and almost 3,400 at a Wisconsin farm. The Humane Society Veterinary Medical Association advocated culling the mink to prevent infections and especially mutations.

An outbreak of H5N1 bird flu has been spreading at a mink farm in Utah since mid-August 2026. Unlike with poultry farms in the United States, mink farms are not subject to federally mandated culling in the event of a bird flu outbreak. The lack of federal and state response has drawn criticism from infectious disease experts.

== See also ==
- Animal rights
- Animal welfare
- Environmental impacts of fur farming
- Fur clothing
- Fur trade

== Bibliography ==
- European Commission (21 December 2023). "Communication from the Commission on the European Citizens' Initiative (ECI) 'Fur Free Europe' (C/2023/1559)". Official Journal of the European Union.
