= List of newspapers in Denmark =

The number of national daily newspapers in Denmark was 127 in 1950, whereas it was 37 in 1965. In 2009 the number of newspapers was 36.

The European Journalism Centre (EJC) categorizes Danish newspapers into five groups: National newspapers with large distribution such as Jyllands-Posten, Politiken and Berlingske Tidende; national newspapers with small distribution such as Information and Kristeligt Dagblad; regional and local newspapers, tabloids and free newspapers such as Ekstrabladet and BT. This is a list of newspapers in Denmark:

== National ==
Title	Published	Est.	Readership (2018)	Owner	Political Orientation
Berlingske	Daily	1749	141,000	Berlingske Media	Conservative
B.T.	Daily	1916	75,000	Berlingske Media	Tabloidism
B.T. Metro	Daily		264,000	Berlingske Media	Tabloidism
The Copenhagen Post	Weekly	1997		The Copenhagen Post	Liberal
Dagbladet Arbejderen	Daily			Communist Party	Communism
Dagbladet Børsen	Daily	1896	109,000	Bonnier Group	Economically liberal
Dagbladet Information	Daily	1945	82,000	A/S Information	Independent
Ekstrabladet	Daily	1904	91,000	JP/Politikens Hus	Tabloidism
Kristeligt Dagblad	Daily	1896	109,000	Kristeligt Dagblad	Christian democratic
Morgenavisen Jyllands-Posten	Daily	1871	172,000	JP/Politikens Hus	Liberal-conservative
Dagbladet Politiken	Daily	1884	254,000	JP/Politikens Hus	Social-liberal
Søndagsavisen	Sunday	1978		Søndagsavisen	
Weekendavisen	Friday	1971	190,000	Berlingske Media	Liberal-conservative

== Regional ==
=== Funen ===
- Fyens Stiftstidende
- Fyns Amts Avis
- Kjerteminde Avis
- Lokal Avisen Odense
- Områdeavisen Nordfyn
- Otterup Avis
- ugeavisen Odense
- Xtra Fyens Stiftstidende

=== Jutland ===
- Århus Stiftstidende
- Dagbladet Holstebro
- Der Nordschleswiger
- Flensborg Avis
- Fredericia Dagblad
- Herning Folkeblad
- Horsens Folkeblad
- Jydske Vestkysten
- Kolding Ugeavis
- Midtjylland Hverdag
- Midtjyllands Avis
- Morsø Folkeblad
- Newsbreak.dk
- Nordjyske Stiftstidende
- Randers Amtsavis
- Ringkjøbing Amts Dagblad
- Skagen Onsdag
- Skive Folkeblad
- Skive Her
- Thisted Dagblad
- Vejle Amts Folkeblad
- Viborg Stifts Folkeblad

=== Isles ===
- Bornholms Tidende
- Lolland-Falsters Folketidende
- Møns Tidende

=== Zealand ===
- Ballerup Bladet
- Frederikssund Lokalavisen
- Dagbladet/Frederiksborg Amts Avis
- Helsingør Dagblad
- Holbæk Amts
- Kalundborg Folkeblad
- Næstved Tidende
- Præstø Avis
- Sjællands Tidende
- Sydkysten
- Vordingborg Dagblad

== See also ==
- List of magazines in Denmark
- List of newspapers
