= Ritzau =

Danish news agency

- Type: Aktieselskab
- Industry: News media
- Founded: 1 February 1866
- Headquarters: Store Kongensgade 14; DK 1264 Copenhagen K, Denmark
- Area served: worldwide
- Key people: Lars Vesterløkke (CEO); Erik Bjerager (Chairman)
- Products: Wire service
- Website: ritzau.dk

Ritzaus Bureau A/S, or Ritzau for short, sometimes stylized as /ritzau/, is a Danish news agency founded by Erik Ritzau in 1866. It collaborates with three other Scandinavian news agencies to provide Nordic News, an English-language Scandinavian news service. It is based in Copenhagen and Lars Vesterløkke is editor-in-chief and CEO of the company.

== History ==
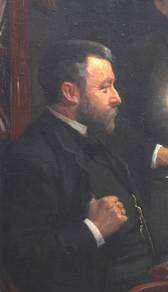
Erik Ritzau

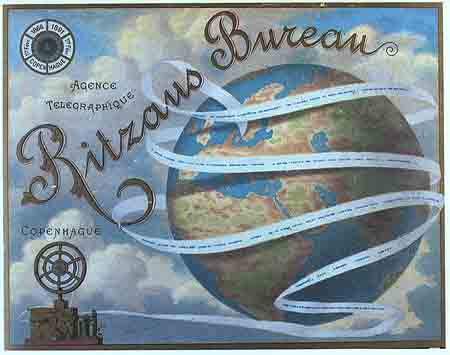
Ritzaus Bureau

Ritzau logo used before 2011

Ritzaus Bureau was founded by Erik Nicolai Ritzau in Copenhagen on 1 February 1866 under the name Nordisk Centralbureau for Telegrammer. The agency received international news by telegram from Wolffs Bureau (now Deutsche Presse-Agentur, DPA) in Berlin.

Erik Ritzau died in 1904. His son, Lauritz Ritzau, was CEO of the company from 1916 to 1958. The Ritzau family sold Ritzaus Bureau to the Danish newspapers in 1947. In 2007, DR became a co-owner of the agency. The company form was changed from an interessentskab (I/S) to an aktieselskab (A/S) in 2012.

== Operations ==
Ritzau collaborates with three other Scandinavian news agencies to provide Nordic News, an English-language Scandinavian news service providing sixty stories daily. Ritzau is a member of the European Gruppe 39 collaboration.

== Scanpix ==
In November 2017, Ritzau acquired Scanpix Denmark from Berlingske Media with effect from 1 January 2018. Scanpix is the leading Danish stock photography agency in Denmark with more than 25 million pictures on stock in its digital and physical archives. It collaborates closely with sister companies in Norway, Sweden and Estonia.

== Ownership ==
Ritzaus Bureau is today owned by 12 media groups;

- Dagbladet Børsen
- DR
- Jysk Fynske Medier
- Helsingør Dagblad
- JP/Politikens Hus
- Dagbladet Information
- Kristeligt Dagblad
- Lolland-Falsters Folketidende
- Mediehusene Midtjylland
- Sjællandske Medier
- Skive Folkeblad
- Nordjyske

== Awards ==
In January 1988, Ritzau journalist Jens Jørgen Espersen received the Cavling Prize for his covering of the Thorotrast scandal.

== See also ==
- Media of Denmark
