= JydskeVestkysten =

Danish daily newspaper

- Type: Daily newspaper
- Format: Broadsheet
- Owner: Syddanske Medier
- Publisher: Jydske Vestkysten A/S
- Founded: 15 January 1991; 35 years ago
- Political alignment: Liberal
- Language: Danish
- Headquarters: Esbjerg
- Country: Denmark
- Website: www.jv.dk

JydskeVestkysten is a Danish language regional newspaper published in Esbjerg, Denmark, which is among the largest publications in the country.

== History and profile ==
JydskeVestkysten was first published on 15 January 1991 as a result of the merge between Vestkysten, which was founded in 1917, and Jydske Tidende. The paper is based in Esbjerg.

The Berlingske Media, a subsidiary of first Orkla Media and then, of Mecom, had 50% share in the paper. The other owner was the Den Sydvestjyske Venstrepresse company. Syddanske Medier acquired 100% of the paper on 15 September 2013. The publisher of the paper is Jydske Vestkysten A/S.

JydskeVestkysten is published in broadsheet format. In 1993, another local daily Kolding Folkeblad merged with the paper, allowing the paper to cover both western and southern Jutland.

The European Parliament described JydskeVestkysten as a liberal newspaper in 1998. It is also stated by the owner of the paper, indicating that the paper has no political affiliation. However, the Danish ministry of foreign affairs regards paper as holding independent conservative views. In a 2006 study, it was described as a right-wing newspaper.

== Circulation ==
In 1999, the circulation of JydskeVestkysten was 94,234 copies, making it the sixth largest newspaper in the country. Its circulation was 91,000 copies in 2000, making it again the sixth bestselling paper. The paper sold 86,000 copies in 2002. In 2003, the paper had a circulation of 80,597 copies. The 2004 circulation of the paper was 81,000 copies. Its circulation was 76,550 copies in 2006 and 72,323 copies in 2007. JydskeVestkysten sold 48,773 copies in 2013, being the seventh best-selling newspaper in the country.
