= Dato (newspaper) =

Defunct Danish free daily newspaper

dato
- Type: Free daily newspaper
- Format: Compact
- Owner: Det Berlingske Officin A/S
- Editor: Steen Breiner
- Founded: 16 August 2006
- Ceased publication: 19 April 2007
- Language: Danish
- Headquarters: Copenhagen, Denmark

Dato (Danish: date) is a defunct Danish free daily newspaper published in Denmark between 2006 and 2007.

== History and profile ==
Launched on 16 August 2006, Dato was Berlingske's offering in the "newspaper war" initiated by Dagsbrún's Nyhedsavisen. dato was, however, the first of the recent free dailies delivered to people's homes to begin publishing. The paper was owned by Det Berlingske Officin. It was distributed in Metropolitan Copenhagen and the suburbs of Århus.

The 2006 circulation of the paper was 200,000 copies in 2006. It had a circulation of 400,000 copies in March 2007.

Dato closed on 19 April 2007, and merged with another Danish free daily newspaper, Urban, also owned by Det Berlingske Officin. Det Berlingske Officin paid over 250 million DKK to publish the newspaper.

== See also ==
- 24timer
- MetroXpress
- Nyhedsavisen
