= Realph Norland =

Norwegian newspaper editor and politician

Realph Immanuel Ottesen Norland (30 August 1903 – 5 October 1963) was a Norwegian newspaper editor and politician for the Conservative Party, best known as editor-in-chief of Tønsbergs Blad.

== Career ==
He was born in Bergen to pharmacist J. Norland. His father and his brother, Andreas Norland, were both active in the Conservative Party. Norland took the examen artium in 1921 and the cand.jur. degree in 1925. In 1924 he was a board member of the Norwegian Students' Society, and in 1925 he chaired the Oslo Conservative Students' association.

He soon became involved in politics. From 1926 to 1932 he was a secretary in Fedrelandslaget. He then joined the Conservative Party, and was the secretary for its national board from 1933 to 1940. After World War II he helped with rebuilding the party, which had been forbidden for the last five years, during the German occupation of Norway. He became editor-in-chief of the party newspaper Tønsbergs Blad. He sat from 1945 to 1946 and from 1954 to his death. He was also known for hiring Sverre Mitsem in the newspaper in 1942, effective from 1945 when World War II was over. Mitsem became co-editor with Norland in 1954, and continued after Norland's death. Later political work included a seat in Tønsberg city council, which Norland held from 1955 to his death. From 1956 he was a member of the committee that wrote the Conservative Party national platform.

Together with pharmacist Aasta Sigrun Sæther (1903–1968) he had the son Andreas Norland, who started his career in Tønsbergs Blad in 1958 and became editor-in-chief of Adresseavisen, Verdens Gang, Osloavisen and Aftenposten. Realph Norland died abruptly in October 1963, when his heart stopped.
