= Århus Stiftstidende =

Local newspaper in Aarhus, Denmark

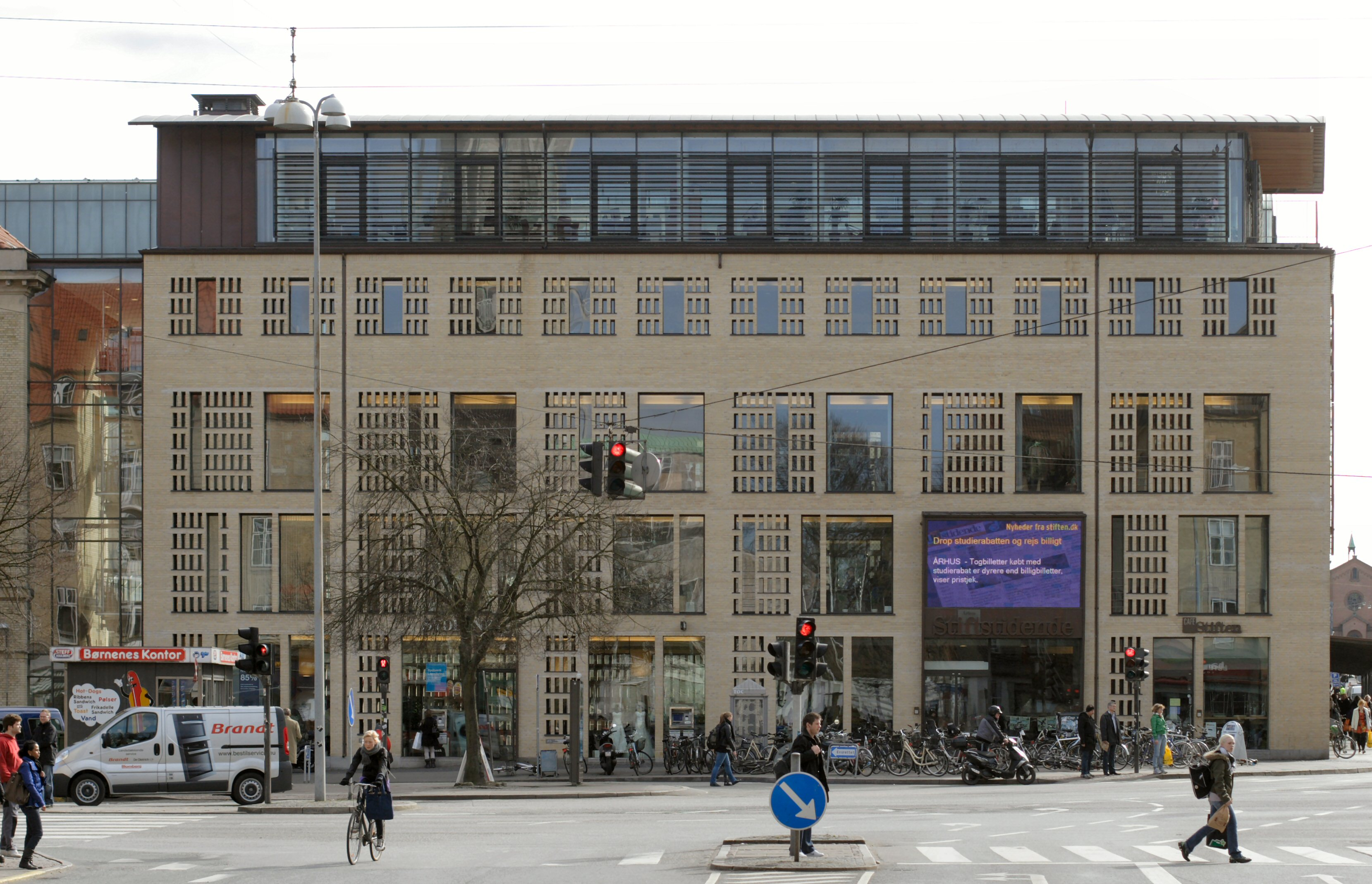
- "Banegårdshuset", the headquarters of Århus Stiftstidende since 2005.
- Type: Daily newspaper
- Format: Broadsheet
- Owner: Jysk Fynske Medier
- Publisher: Jysk Fynske Medier
- Founded: 3 January 1794; 232 years ago
- Language: Danish
- Headquarters: Banegårdshuset Aarhus C, Denmark
- Website: Århus Stiftstidende

Århus Stiftstidende (colloquially Stiften) is a Danish newspaper based in Aarhus, Denmark, focusing largely on local topics.

The independent newspaper with a bourgeois character has suffered a considerable decline in circulation in recent years. While it still sold 74,000 copies per day in 1978, the newspaper only sold 19,661 copies in May 2011 (weekend edition: 24,567 copies). Compared to other Danish newspapers, the loss within one year was the greatest at 15.5% (14.3%).

== History and profile ==
First published by Niels Lund on 3 January 1794, Århus Stiftstidende is among the oldest businesses in Denmark still in operation. It originated as part of the Stiftstidende dailies; with two other Stiftstidende newspapers published in Aalborg - Aalborg Stiftstidende founded in 1767 -, and Odense - Fyens Stiftstidende started in 1772. Until 1927, the publishing company of Aarhuus Stiftsbogtrykkerie owned and published the paper. Between 1918 and 1952, Louis Schmidt served as the editor-in-chief.

Århus Stifstidende serves for Jutland. The paper has no official political affiliation, but has a liberal political leaning. It is published in broadsheet format. On 1 January 2007, Århus Stifstidende merged with other local newspapers in Midtjylland to form the editorial company of Midtjyske Medier, then a branch of Berlingske Media. In late 2015, Midtjyske Medier was sold and fused with Jysk Fynske Medier, the second largest mediagroup in Denmark by turnover.

Århus Stiftstidende used to publish the free local weekly newspaper Aarhus Onsdag (Aarhus Wednesday) and the cityguide website AOA, Alt Om Aarhus (All About Aarhus). The Aarhus Onsdag paper is more limited in its scope, is financed completely by advertisements and is available both in paperform and online, but was sold to competitor JP/Politikens Hus in June 2017. The AOA website was also free and included a number of free online magazines covering fashion, culture, tourist guiding, studentlife etc., but was terminated in 2016 after the sale of Midtjyske Medier.

== Circulation ==
Århus Stiftstidende had a circulation of 71,000 copies on weekdays and 83,000 copies on Sundays in the first quarter of 2000, making it one of the top 20 newspapers in the country. The circulation of the paper was 59,000 copies in 2002. The paper had a circulation of 55,000 copies in 2003. The paper sold 51,500 copies in 2005.

During the first half of 2009 the circulation of Århus Stiftstidende was 24,231 copies. It fell to 22,168 copies during the first six months of 2010 and to 20,329 copies during the first six months of 2011.
