= Viborg Stifts Folkeblad =

Daily newspaper based in Viborg, Denmark

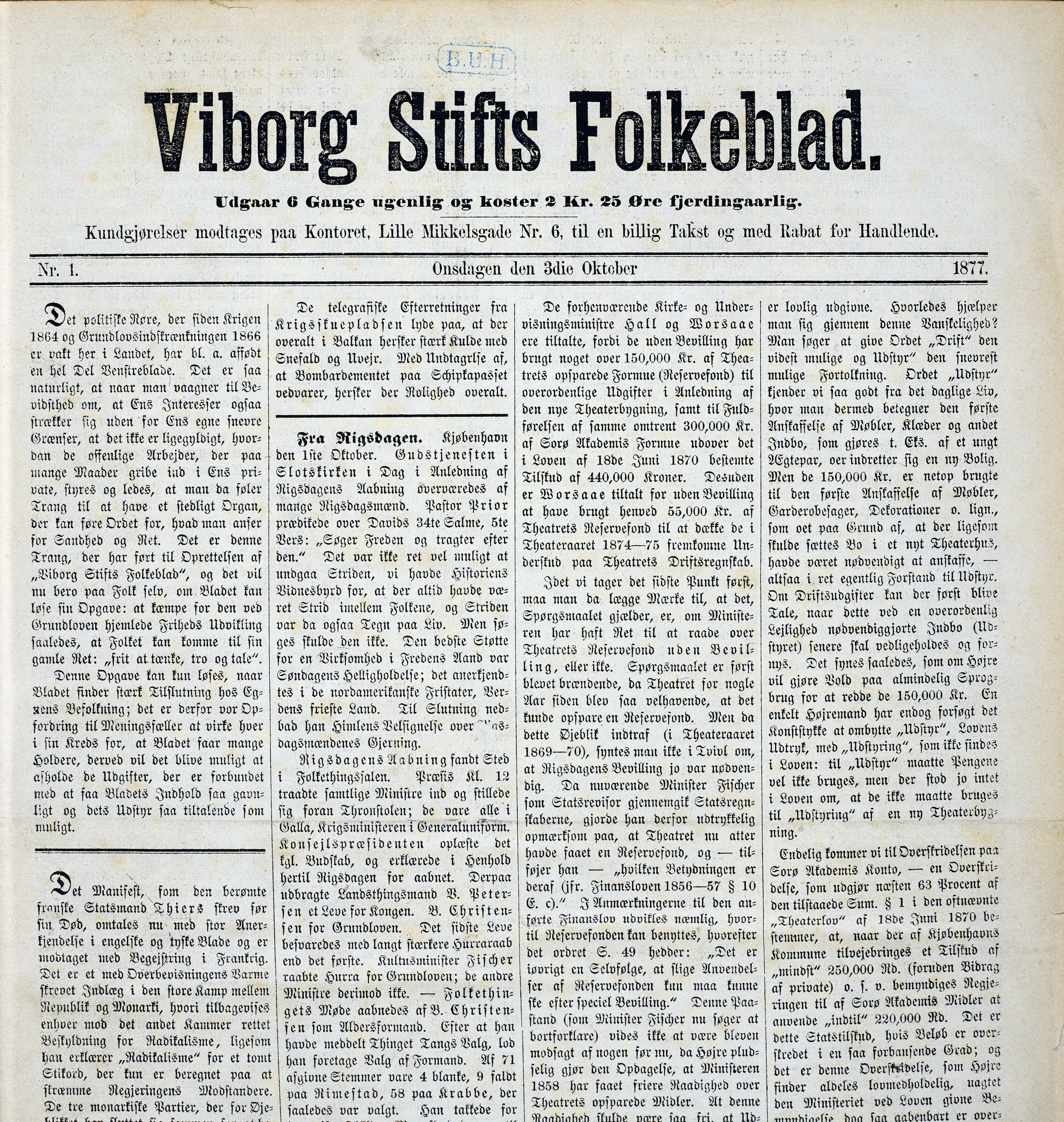
- Viborg Stifts Folkeblad on 3 October 1877
- Type: Daily newspaper
- Owner: Jysk Fynske Medier P/S
- Publisher: Jysk Fynske Medier P/S
- Editor: Andreas Søndergaard
- Founded: 1 October 1877; 148 years ago
- Political alignment: Venstre (until 1976)
- Headquarters: Viborg, Denmark
- Website: www.viborg-folkeblad.dk

Viborg Stifts Folkeblad is a daily newspaper based in Viborg, Denmark. The paper serves the Viborg Municipality.

== History ==
Viborg Stifts Folkeblad was founded on 1 October 1877 as an alternative to the conservative Viborg Stiftstidende. In 1880, the newspaper was taken over by De Bergske Blade, led by Christen Berg. Viborg Amts Tidende, a daily newspaper, was formed in 1890 as opposition to Folkeblad. It later ceased operations in 1910. Due to ownership by De Bergske Blade, the newspaper aligned with the Venstre, a liberal political party, until 1976.

The newspaper was purchased by Midtjyske Medier in 2007, following a merger with Berlingske. However, Midtjyske Medier later announced that it was ceasing operations in August 2012 by its parent company Mecom Group. Despite local interest to purchase the newspaper, both Mecom and Berlingske announced it would not allow the newspaper to become independent. It was purchased by its current ownership, Jysk Fynske Medier P/S, on 1 January 2016.

In 2011, Viborg Stifts Folkeblad announced an increase in circulation while other locals newspaper reported losses. In September 2023, the newspaper began delivery of its physical copies in the morning, citing a decline in paying readers due to an increase in digital news.

== Editors ==
The current editor-in-chief is Andreas Søndergaard, who took over for Lars Norup after Norup announced his own retirement in late 2023. Søndergaard took over his role on 19 January 2024.
