= Sverre Mitsem (writer) =

Sverre Mitsem (1907–2004) was a Norwegian journalist, newspaper editor and article writer. He is known as editor-in-chief of Tønsbergs Blad from 1954 to 1977 (until 1963 joint with Realph Norland) and for the column "SORRY" in Aftenposten, which he wrote from 1946 to 1996.

== Career ==
He was born in Glemmen, and had his first journalist job in Fredriksstad Blad.. He later travelled to Kristiania to study, but instead started working in Norges Fremtid. He then worked as a journalist with ABC and Tidens Tegn between 1936 and 1941. These two publications were located on the authoritarian right wing politically; ABC had ties to Fedrelandslaget, whereas Tidens Tegn was a former party organ of the Liberal People's Party (Frisinnede Folkeparti). In the summer of 1940, Mitsem also participated in radio broadcasts in the Nazi-controlled Norwegian Broadcasting Corporation. Tidens Tegn was permanently discontinued in 1941 because of the Nazi occupation, but in 1942 Mitsem was asked by Realph Norland to work in the newspaper Tønsbergs Blad, which had ties to the Conservative Party. He began working there in 1945 when World War II was over. In 1954 he was promoted to co-editor alongside Norland, and when Norland died in 1963 Mitsem became the sole editor-in-chief. He retired in 1977.

Mitsem reached out to an even larger audience with the column "SORRY e. Trollhaugens Tass" in Aftenposten, which was Norway's largest circulated newspaper until 1981. He was contacted by their news editor P. Chr. Andersen in October 1945, who wanted a daily column with humorous and satirical tidbits. The column took the shape of an eponymous Cocker Spaniel; the dog figure was chosen from a series of candidates presented by Egil Meidell Hopp. Mitsem continued the column long after his retirement, and quit in 1996 after fifty years. He was nearing his 89th birthday at that time. The column was carried on by others. Mitsem was also a theatre critic for Høyres Pressebyrå, which delivered articles to a large number of conservative newspapers. He also wrote petit articles in Tønsbergs Blad under the pseudonym "Gambrinius", and in Tidens Tegn under the pseudonym "Andriksen". Many articles were published as books.

He was also a member of the board of Høyres Pressebyrå. He was active in the Riksmål Society, and won their award "The Golden Pen". In 1970 he won the Narvesen Prize for journalism. He died in 2004.

Awards
Preceded by Kai Otto Hansen	Recipient of the Narvesen Prize; 1970	Succeeded by Asbjørn Larsen and Lars Sigurd Sunnanå
