= Haugesunds Avis =

Newspaper published in Haugesund, Norway

- Type: Daily newspaper
- Format: Tabloid
- Owner: Amedia (100%)
- Founder: 1895
- Editor-in-chief: Bård Borch Michalsen
- Language: Norwegian
- Headquarters: Karmsundgata, Haugesund
- Circulation: 29,907 (2009)
- Website: http://www.h-avis.no

Haugesunds Avis is a daily newspaper published in Haugesund, Norway, but with branches in Bømlo, Kopervik, Odda, Sauda and Stord.

Founded in 1895, it is today owned by the investment group Mecom Group, and is as such part of the media group Edda Media. In 2006, Haugesunds Avis had a circulation of 33,448. As of 2012, the executive editor is Bård Borch Michalsen. The newspaper owns the local radio channel Radio 102.
