= Radio24syv =

Defunct Danish public service radio station

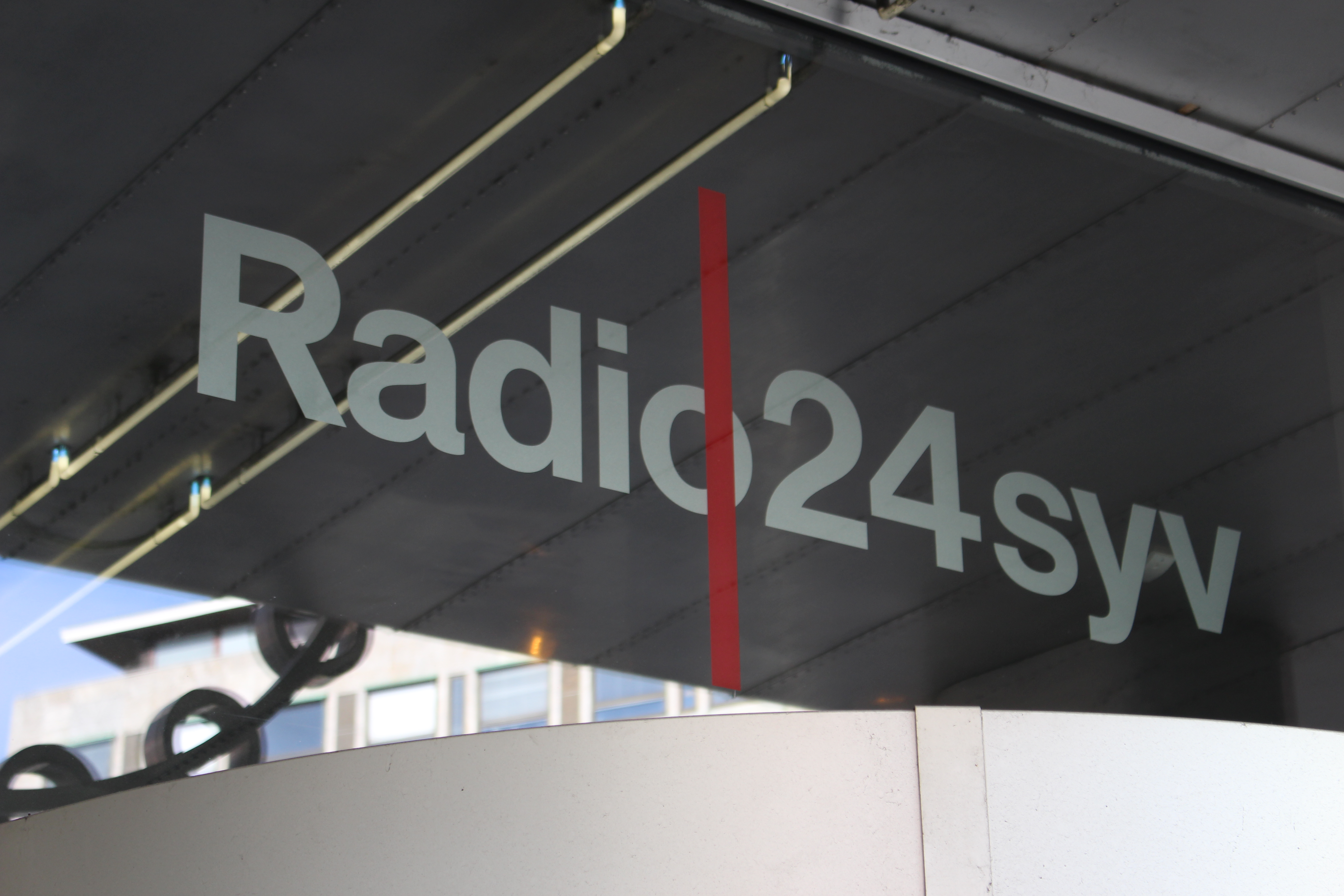

Denmark
- Broadcast area: Denmark

Programming
- Language: Danish

Ownership
- Owner: Berlingske People A/S (a Consortium by Berlingske Media and PeopleGroup)

History
- First air date: November 1, 2011; 14 years ago
- Last air date: October 31, 2019; 6 years ago

Radio24syv (English: "Radio 24 seven") was a Danish public service radio station sending talk radio. The radio station was financed by public money through mandatory licence fees, but was privately owned by Berlingske Media and PeopleGroup. The public funding was followed by requirements about the types of programs the radio station should broadcast.

The radio station was untraditional and provocative, and has been credited with reviving Danish talk radio.

The satire show program The Short Radio News was among its most popular programs.

== History ==
=== Establishment ===
In 2010, shortly after he was appointed as new Minister of Culture, Per Stig Møller floated the idea of a new country-wide radio channel. A few months later, political negotiations regarding media concluded with a political agreement between the incumbent Venstre-Conservative government, and Danish People's Party and Liberal Alliance, its parliamentary support. A part of that agreement was the establishment of a new privately owned radio station, financed by public money, meant to compete with DR P1, operated by the state-owned DR. Following the announcement, the coming radio channel was given the nickname "Radio Møller", in reference to the Minister of Culture.

In January 2011, the new radio channel was sent in public procurement. While several actors in the Danish media marked planned to launch a bid, at least two consortiums declined (JP/Politikens Hus and Danish TV 2; and Dagbladet Information, Fynske Medier and Douglas Entertainment), as they felt the very detailed requirement in the procurement threatened their editorial freedom. Eventually, only one actor made a bid, a consortium consisting of Berlingske Media and PeopleGroup, and in April 2011, they were rewarded the procurement. They named the station "Radio24syv", and it started broadcasting on 1 November 2011.

=== Tenure ===
In December 2012, the radio changed its slogan from "Denmark's new talk radio" to "Room for differences" (Danish: "Højt til loftet").

In May 2015, radio host Asger Juhl killed a rabbit, by hitting it with a bike pump, during a morning program about animal welfare. The purpose was to highlight the hypocrisy about people's relation to animals while eating meat. During the program, television personality Linse Kessler tried to prevent the killing. The rabbit was eaten by Juhl and his co-host Kristoffer Eriksen that evening. The killing gained international attention and sparked many angry reaction, with the hosts receiving death threats. The killing was defended by the radio, as the rabbit was eaten and not thrown out.

On 19 November 2018, former gang leader and radio host of Police Radio Nedim Yasar was shot and died the following day. After leaving his criminal life behind, Yasar had become a mentor for troubled youths, and talked about his experience. A book about Yasar's life, written by his co-host Marie Louise Toksvig, had just been released, and Yasar was shot when he left the book reception. In December 2018, three men was arrested and charged with murder in the case, with a fourth following in January 2019. The case is expected to go to trial in January 2020.

=== 2019 closure ===
In March 2019, Radio24syv announced that they would not apply to have their broadcasting license renewed when it was to expire on 31 October 2019, effectively closing the radio station. The decision was based on a new political requirement that at least 70% of all editorial staff should be situated at least 110 km from Copenhagen – it was a wish from the Danish People's Party (DPP) that the station was moved to Jutland. Originally, in a June 2018 political agreement, the requirement was that 50% of all editorial staff and all administrative staff should be placed in Jutland, but as such a requirement for administrative staff turned out to be against EU law, they were changed in later political negotiations. Following the announcement, the DPP was met with heavy criticism, with chief of programs, Mads Brügger, calling it "a victory for pettiness and vindictiveness" and "harassment" by DPP. Two weeks later, DPP said that while they would not change the requirements, they were open to see if Radio24syv could survive in another form.

Eventually, only one party applied for the license, and the FM channel was in July awarded to Radio4, which is owned by a consortium headed by Jysk Fynske Medier, for the following eight years. The license was followed by funding of 108 million DKK the first year, falling to 93 million DKK the last.

In May, the government and DPP announced an agreement that should make it possible for Radio24syv to continue broadcasting. The agreement launched a new talk radio station, which was to broadcast via DAB instead of over FM. This new station would receive yearly funding of 70 million DKK, and would not have any geographic requirements. This station replaced another planned DAB station with focus on culture and classical music, which was dropped. In August, the owners of Radio24syv announced that they intended to apply for the new DAB station. Companies interested in the originally planned DAB station decided to withdraw from the contest, with Bauer Media calling the process "a joke", and Le Gammeltoft from Heartbeats saying that the procurement was already decided in favor of Radio24syv.

Radio24syv surprisingly lost the procurement to Radio Loud, a channel aimed at young listeners and owned by local radio channels in partnership with a number of cultural institutions. Both Loud's application and the decision, taken by the governmental Radio and TV Board on 22 October, to grant them the channel was heavily criticized. Their application was written in just over a month, and Sebastian Dorset, intended to be responsible for satire, was contacted two days prior to the deadline. The Radio and TV Board twice raised doubts that Loud could fulfill the minimum requirements, but did not disqualify them. Media experts warned that Loud's partnership model could mean that they were used for advertisement for their partners, and could distort competition. Media expert Lasse Jensen called the closure "the most absurd media-political process, he had ever seen".

The Radio and TV Board evaluated the applications using a point system, where program plans was weighted 40%, quality and realism 35%, and economy 25%. Ultimately, economy was the greatest factor for Loud's win. On a scale from 0 to 8, both Radio24syv and Loud got between 6-7 points on the first two categories, but on economy Loud received 7 points, while Radio24syv received only 1 point. Radio24syv had applied for the full funding of 280 million DKK over four years, while Loud had applied for 261 million DKK. The third bidder, dk4, had applied for 256 million DKK, and was awarded 8 points. According to experts, the model used caused the economy to be of more importance than the 25% implies. While the model was known in advance, the estimated lowest bidder, which determined the variance, was not. Experts said Radio24syv had been sloppy in their application, and that they were too confident in themselves. Jakob Kvist replied by saying that their bid was to continue Radio24syv, and that contentwise the evaluation was "completely incomprehensible". Mathematicians have found errors in the calculations of points, but not enough to change the overall result alone.

The surprising result led to the involvement of politicians. Two days after the announcement, the Danish Social Liberal Party said they wanted a rerun of the procurement, with Jens Rohde saying it was not fair because Radio24syv would cover all of Denmark, but Loud would not. Applicants could choose between two different DAB nets and Loud choose one that only covers about 82% of Denmark, which was sufficient to be considered nation-wide. Liberal Alliance and The New Right later joined in, also wanting a rerun. Other parties demanded an explanation from the acting Minister of Culture, Rasmus Prehn. Experts warned that the political involvement threatened the arm's length principle. On 28 October, Prehn said the Radio and TV Board should answer all the questions that the applicants might have. Radio24syv sent in almost 70 questions. In their answers, given on 1 November, the Radio and TV board dismissed the criticism, and stood by their decision.

Radio24syv ended their broadcasting on 31 October 2019 by playing Fanfare for the Common Man live from their roof.

On 5 November, after a meeting between the acting Minister of Culture, the Radio and TV board, and spokespersons from the political parties, Prehn said that it was not legally possible to reopen the procurement. On 23 November, Radio24syv sued the Radio and TV board; a lawsuit financed by the Civil Rights Foundation.

== Leadership ==
Jørgen Ramskov has been CEO of radio24syv for its entire broadcast period. However, in May 2019 he announced that he would leave the station, when the current broadcast permit runs out on 31 October 2019. In August 2019, Jakob Kvist was announced as new CEO and editor-en-chief, should they gain the new DAB-permit.

Originally, Suzanne Moll was editor-in-chief, and leader of the news department, but in November 2013, it was announced that she had quit, effective from the end of January 2013. Jørgen Ramskov took over both of her responsibilities, while a new administrative leader were hired. In August 2014 Simon Andersen became leader of the news department. In September 2018 Kristoffer Eriksen succeeded him in that job.

To lead the program department, Mikael Bertelsen and Mads Brügger were hired as channel chief prior to the station starting to air. In November 2012, after Moll had quit, but before it was announced, Brügger was fired effective immediately by Ramskov. The firing were caused by a split between the program department and the news department, and an underlying disagreement about how the channel should evolve, with both Bertelsen and Brügger experimenting, while Moll stood for the serious. After only 32 days, Brügger were re-hired in the same job, but now both his and Bertelsen's job title renamed to program chiefs instead of channel chiefs.

== Recurring programs ==
Title	Period	Description	Category
100% Brian	2019		Politics
24 Questions for the Professor (24 Spørgsmål til Professoren)	2016–2019		Knowledge
24syv Documentary (24syv Dokumentar)	2011–2019		Documentary
24syv Afternoon (24syv Eftermiddag)	2011–2014		Current and news
24syv Morning (24syv Morgen)	2011–2019		Current and news
24syv News (24syv Nyheder)	2011–2019	5 minutes news every hour	Current and news
24syv Weekend	2014		Current and news
3. Planet from the Sun; (3. Planet fra Solen)	2011–2012	Science, technology and society	Knowledge
55 minutes (55 minutter)	2017–2019	Single story in depth	Current and news
AK 24syv	2011–2019		Culture
Eavesdropped (Aflyttet)	2011–2019	Surveillance and intelligence	Society
Anne Hunt (Annejagt)	2015–2016		Society
Anti-democratic Festival (Antidemokratisk Festival)	2014	Satire	Entertainment
Aydin and the Father's Group (Aydin og fædregruppen)	2012		Society
Bearnaise is the Animal King (Bearnaise er Dyrenes Konge)	2014–2019	Food reviews	Culture
The Mind Field (Bevidsthedsfeltet)	2017–2018		Society
The Tan Line (Bikinilinien)	2015		Entertainment
Car Radio (Bilradio)	2013–2015		Culture
Magazines from the mouth (Bladet fra munden)	2018–2019		Entertainment
Bom and Bjerke (Bom og Bjerke)	2011–2012	Everyday feminism	Society
The Bureau for Rejected Literature (Bureauet for Afvist Litteratur)	2013–2015		Culture
The Waist (Bæltestedet)	2013–2018	Satire	Entertainment
The Cavling Committee (Cavling Komiteen)	2014–2015	Media discussion by award-winning journalists	Current and news
Center for Crazy Analysis (Center for Vild Analyse)	2011–2012		Business
The Comedy Club Smiling Table (Comedyklubben Smiling Table)	2017	Satire	Entertainment
Cordua & Steno	2011–2019	Right-wing political pundits	Politics
Croque Monsieur	2015–2019	France	Culture
The Women's Magazine (Damernes Magazine)	2013		Culture
Voice of Denmark (Danmarks Röst)	2014	Radio to politically correct Sweden	Culture
Date Line (Datolinien)	2012–2019	International news	International
The 6 Hats (De 6 Hatte)	2011–2017	Entrepreneurs and their business ideas	Business
The Blue Book (Den Blå Bog)	2019	Kraks Blå Bog	Culture
The Burning Man (Den Brændende Mand)	2015		Documentary
The Short Radio News (Den Korte Radioavis)	2015–2017 2018–2019	Satire with fictional Kirsten Birgit Schiøtz Kretz Hørsholm and Rasmus Bruun	Entertainment
The Short Weekend News (Den Korte Weekendavis)	2018	Satire with fictional Kirsten Birgit Schiøtz Kretz Hørsholm and Rasmus Bruun	Entertainment
The Best Time (Den Bedste Tid)	2014–2015		Current and news
The Great Novel (Den Store Roman)	2011–2013	Following authors who write a novel	Culture
The US presidential election (Det amerikanske præsidentvalg)	2012	2012 United States Presidential election	Business
The Little Meme Factory (Det Lille Mememageri)	2018–2019		Entertainment
The Next Chapter (Det Næste Kapitel)	2015–2019	Interviews in two parts	Culture
The Red Area (Det Røde Felt)	2013–2019	Left-wing political pundit	Politics
What we talk about (Det, vi taler om)	2014–2019	Gossip	Entertainment
After Eight (Efter Otte)	2013–2019	Evening rebroadcast of clips	Current and news
Elektronista	2011–2019	Digital	Society
Are You Sunshine? (Er Du Sunshine?)	2016–2019	Friday bar	Entertainment
An Animal Life (Et Dyreliv)	2014–2016		Culture
Europe in Flames (Europa i Flammer)	2012–2019	EU debates	Politics
The Fat Monkey's Closing-time (Fedeabes Fyraften)	2017–2019	Odd stories by Anders Lund Madsen	Entertainment
Finn'ish Therapy (Finnsk Terapi)	2014–2019	Conversations with Finn Nørbygaard	Culture
Fishing License (Fisketegn)	2017–2019	Conversations while fishing	Culture
Fitness M/K	2015–2019	Training	Culture
Genie in the Bottle (Flaskens Ånd)	2011-2019	Conversations while tasting wine	Culture
Football FM (Fodbold FM)	2011–2019		Culture
Start Over with Jeppesen (Forfra med Jeppesen)	2011–2015		Society
Parent-school Portal (Forældreintra)	2016–2019	Parenting	Society
The Frank Aaen Archive (Frank Aaen Arkivet)	2014	Cleaning up in Frank Aaens archives	Culture
Genialos	2011–2018	Physicist Holger Bech Nielsen and reality star Sidney Lee	Entertainment
Ghetto Fitness	2018–2019		Culture
Globe (Globus)	2011–2019		International
Globe Russia (Globus Rusland)	2011–2012		Current and news
Globe USA (Globus USA)	2011–2014		Current and news
Poets of Grøften (Grøftens Poeter)	2018		Culture
(Fun in the Toll Ring) (Halløj i Betalingsringen)	2011–2013	Satire	Entertainment
Hilter's Dog-ears (Hilters Æselører)	2015–2019	Books about World War II	Knowledge
Huxi and the Good Old Parliament (Huxi og det Gode Gamle Folketing)	2012–2019	Former MP's discuss politics with Huxi Bach	Politics
Hviid's Shelter (Hviids Varmestue)	2015–2017		Society
Højlund's Heroes (Højlunds Helte)	2014–2015		Current and news
Iben and the Mother's Group (Iben og Mødregruppen)	2011–2013		Culture
Ibens	2013–2014		Culture
Internal Affairs (Interne Affærer)	2011–2012	Michael Berthelsen and Mads Brügger discuss Radio24syv	Current and news
Hunting License (Jagttegn)	2017–2019	Out hunting	Culture
Jalving's History Hour (Jalving's Historietime)	2012–2014		Culture
Je Suis Jalving	2016		Society
Jeppe's Biblical School (Jeppes Bibelskole)	2015–2019	Reading the bible piece for piece	Knowledge
The Campaign Trail (Kampagnesporet)	2016–2019	US politics	International
China Talk (Kinasnak)	2013–2019		International
The Clown from Lambedusa (Klovnen fra Lambedusa)	2018		Entertainment
The Collection (Kollektionen)	2012–2016	Fashion	Culture
The Continent (Kontinentet)	2011	EU. Precursor to Globe	Current and news
Kristian Leth's Magic Circle (Kristian Leths Magiske Cirkel)	2012		Culture
Culture in the week (Kultur i ugen)	2012–2013		Culture
The Copenhagen Model (Københavnermodellen)	2016	De-radicalization via improvisation theater	Entertainment
The Future of Lasse Rimmer (Lasse Rimmers Fremtid)	2014	Lasse Rimmer	Current and news
Aqua vitae (Livets vand)	2019		Entertainment
Lubarski's Method (Lubarskimetoden)	2019	Couple's therapy	Society
The Independent (Løsgængeren)	2011–2014	Søren Fauli	Society
Madam Blue (Madam Blå)	2018		Society
Mads Holger in Herning (Mads Holger i Herning)	2013		Entertainment
Mads Holger's New Years Reception (Mads Holgers Nytårskur)	2013–2016		Society
Mads Holger's Swan Song (Mads Holgers Svanesang)	2015	Meltdown of the Conservative People's Party	Society
The Voices of Power (Magtens Stemmer)	2018–2019	Portraits of the elite	Society
Mary and the Old White Men (Mary og de gamle hvide mænd)	2019	Minorities	Society
Meet the Selsings	2017	Right-wing debate	Society
Holding the Microphone (Mikrofonholder)	2011–2019		Documentary
The Millionaire Club (Millionærklubben)	2011–2019	Investment	Business
The Millionaire Club Evening (Millionærklubben Aften)	2013	Investment	Business
My Greek diary (Min græske dagbog)	2017		Documentary
My Little Hassan (Min Lille Hassan)	2016–2017	Hassan Preisler talks with women about men and feelings	Culture
My name is written with dots (Mit navn det står med prikker)	2015	Easter with Morten Lindberg	Current and news
Monogram	2012–2015	Music program	Culture
St. Martin's Day (Mortensaften)	2011–2012		Society
Feel the Host (Mærk Værten)	2013	Relaxazation	Society
The Night Shift (Nattevagten)	2011–2019	People who are awake can call in	Society
Niels Lindvig's News Year Reception (Niels Lindvigs Nytårskur)	2014–2015		International
Nimzowitsch	2017–2019	Chess	Culture
News from North Funen University (Nyt fra Nordfynsk Universitet)	2018–2019		Entertainment
The News Pyramid (Nyhedstrekanten)	2016	Summer news	Current and news
Pakzad's Polemic (Pakzads Polemik)	2017–2018		Culture
Pharao's Cigars (Pharaos Cigarer)	2014–2019	Karsten Pharao reading	Culture
Podcastland	2016–2017		Entertainment
The Poetry Book (Poesibogen)	2019	Poetry read by the author	Culture
The Book Club for Politicians (Politikerbogklubben)	2018–2019		Culture
Police Radio (Politiradio)	2015–2019	Criminal magazine	Current and news
Q&A	2016–2019	Media program	Current and news
Clean Lines (René Linjer)	2016–2018	Society debate with artists	Society
Riskær's Friday Bar (Riskjærs Fredagsbar)	2018–2019	Debate with listeners by Klaus Riskær Pedersen	Society
The Roman Empire (RomerRiget)	2011–2019	Knud Romer	Society
Rushy's Roulette (Rushys Roulette)	2012–2019	Integration and multiculturalism	Society
Raw Tape (Råbånd)	2011–2019	Unedited recordings for 24syv Documentary	Documentary
Questions-Jørgen (Spørgejørgen)	2015–2019	Jørgen Leth answers assorted questions	Culture
The Tower of Voices (Stemmernes tårn)	2018	Roleplay for adults	Culture
Hard Discourse (Stram Diskurs)	2019	Portraits of people on the far right wing	Politics
Sukiyaki	2019	Japanese culture	Culture
Prevarications (Søeforklaringer)	2019	Conversations	Society
Sunday Politics (Søndagspolitikken)	2013–2019		Politics
The Brexit Club	2019		International
The Tibet Papers (Tibet-papirene)	2018	Tibet flag case	Politics
Tour de France FM	2014–2019		Culture
Winter Time (Wintertid)	2017–2019		Entertainment

Source: https://www.24syv.dk/programmer

=== Other programs ===
These program also aired:

- Dødsruten, report series from Tingbjerg, 25 timer
- Ibens, stories from Denmark with room for space and time, 1 hour weekly
- Interne affærer, channel chiefs evaluates and answer on criticism, cancelled
- Jagten på Røde Oktober, program series about the collective movement 2 October, 5 hours
- Monogram, a colorful embrace of Danish music in a talk program, 2 hours regularly
- Reporterne, collects the loose ends in today's newsflow, 3 hours Monday-Friday
- Skriftestolen, panel program about faith and existensialism, 1 hour weekly
- Syvkabalen, portrait program with seven pieces of music from a well-known dane, 2 hours weekly
- Wiki-værkstedet, conversations starting from the Danish Wikipedia, 1 hour weekly
- Zornigs Zone, the socially vulnerable, with Lisbeth Zornig Andersen, 1 hour weekly
