= MJA =

MJA or mja can refer to:

- Medical Journal of Australia, an Australian peer-reviewed medical journal
- Midtjyllands Avis, a local newspaper from Silkeborg, Denmark
- Medical Journalists' Association, an association of medical journalists in the United Kingdom
- Manja Airport, an airport in Manja, Madagascar, by IATA code
- Meja Road, a train station in India; see List of railway stations in India
- ISO 639:mja (or "Mahei"), a spurious language whose ISO 639 code was retired in 2010
