= B.T. (tabloid) =

Danish tabloid newspaper

- Type: Daily newspaper
- Format: Tabloid
- Owner: De Persgroep
- Publisher: Berlingske Media
- Editor: Simon Richard Nielsen
- Founded: 31 August 1916; 110 years ago
- Ceased publication: January 2023 (print)
- Language: Danish
- Headquarters: Copenhagen, Denmark
- Website: bt.dk

B.T. (Danish pronunciation: [ˈpe̝ˀ ˈtsʰe̝ˀ]) is a Danish tabloid newspaper which offers general news about various subjects such as sports, politics and current affairs. B.T. is 100% digital since 2023, after more than a hundred years in the printing press.

== History and profile ==
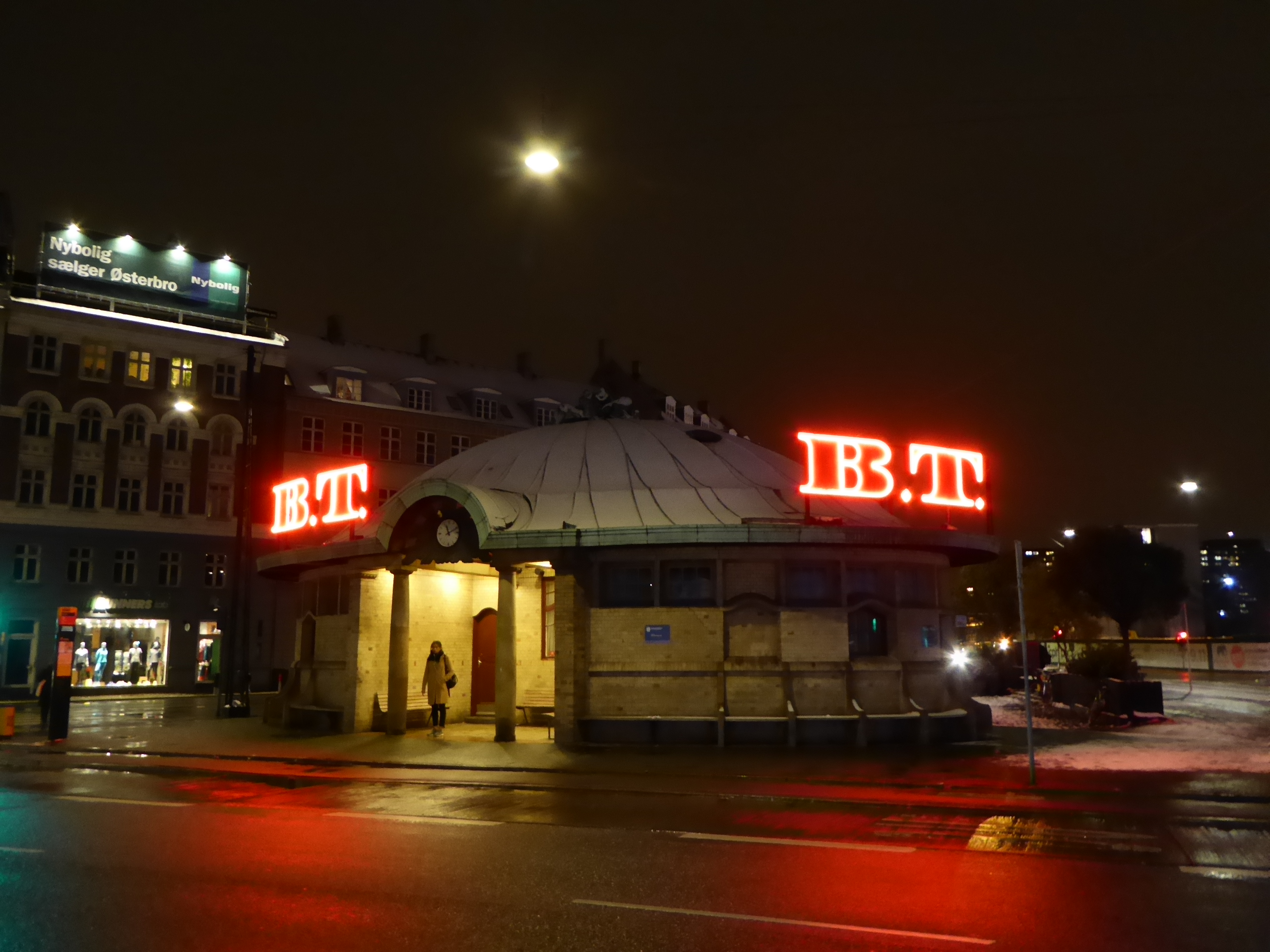
"The Bee" on Trianglen

B.T. was established in 1916 as a tabloid spinoff from Berlingske Tidende. The paper is based in Copenhagen. A large, red neon sign displays the company's logo at the Trianglen square in the Østerbro district of Copenhagen. B.T. is part of Berlingske Media Group. It had a conservative stance in the 1960s.

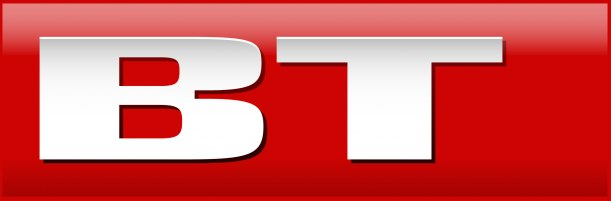
B.T. 'modernized' logo (2012–18)

During the last six months of 1957 the circulation of B.T. was 157,932 copies on weekdays. The paper had a circulation of 196,000 copies in 1991 and 192,000 copies in 1992. It fell to 181,000 copies in 1993, to 164,000 copies in 1994 and to 155,000 copies in 1995. Its circulation further fell to 147,000 copies in 1996, to 138,000 copies in 1997 and to 134,000 copies in 1998. The paper's circulation continued to decrease, and it was 124,000 copies in 1999, 123,000 copies in 2000 and 122,000 copies in 2001.

The circulation of B.T. in 2003 was 110,000 copies. In 2004 the paper had a circulation of 100,000 copies. The 2007 circulation of the paper was 87,319 copies. Its circulation was 82,024 copies in 2008 and 74,330 copies in 2009. It was 69,839 copies in 2010 and 67,983 copies in 2011.

Ever since B.T. was first published, Ekstra Bladet published by JP/Politikens Hus has been its main competition.

=== Since 2020 ===
==== COVID-19 and digitization ====
In 2020, the coronavirus crisis hit B.T. and had consequences for the newspaper. So, the daily newspaper decided to go digital-only.

Since February 2021, artificial intelligence shares content on social media for the newspaper.

On 1 September 2021, B.T. opened four local editorial offices in Denmark's four largest cities to become more visible in the cityscape.

In June 2022, Berlingske Medier decided that from 1 January 2023, B.T. would only be published digitally. Furthermore, the metropolitan editorial offices in Aarhus, Odense and Aalborg would close. The newspaper's editor-in-chief since 2018, Jonas Kuld Rathje, resigned his position with immediate effect on 22 June 2022. The editor-in-chief in charge is Pernille Holbøll. The newspaper manager Per Kofoed confirmed that B.T. printed its last newspaper. This means that the paper newspaper B.T. existed for 106 years.

==== Online views ====
In September 2021, B.T. was Denmark's largest digital media with more than 500,000,000 views.
