= Søndagsavisen =

- Type: Weekend newspaper
- Format: Tabloid
- Owner(s): North Media
- Publisher: Søndagsavisen a-s
- Editor: Arne Ullum
- Founded: 1978; 47 years ago
- Political alignment: -
- Language: Danish
- Headquarters: Søborg, Denmark
- Sister newspapers: Helsingør Dagblad
- Website: www.sondagsavisen.dk

Søndagsavisen is a free Danish countrywide weekend newspaper. It has a circulation of 1.2 million and approximately 1.3 million readers each weekend. That makes it the most widely read newspaper in Denmark.

Its primary focus is weighted towards people between 25 and 50 years old, primarily families with children. It is distributed in 23 different regional editions. The editorial content is oriented towards a national audience and is the same in all regions; only the adverts differ.

Søndagsavisen was fined in 2012, paying the largest sum in Denmark ever, DKK 750,000 for faulty journalism. The court found that Søndagsavisen had wrongfully published a series of articles claiming that Ecobaby, a producer of baby dummies (pacifiers), was using phthalates in their production. The paper later withdrew the articles, but Ecobaby choose to continue the case.
