= Hamar Dagblad =

Weekly newspaper in Hamar, Norway (1971–2022)

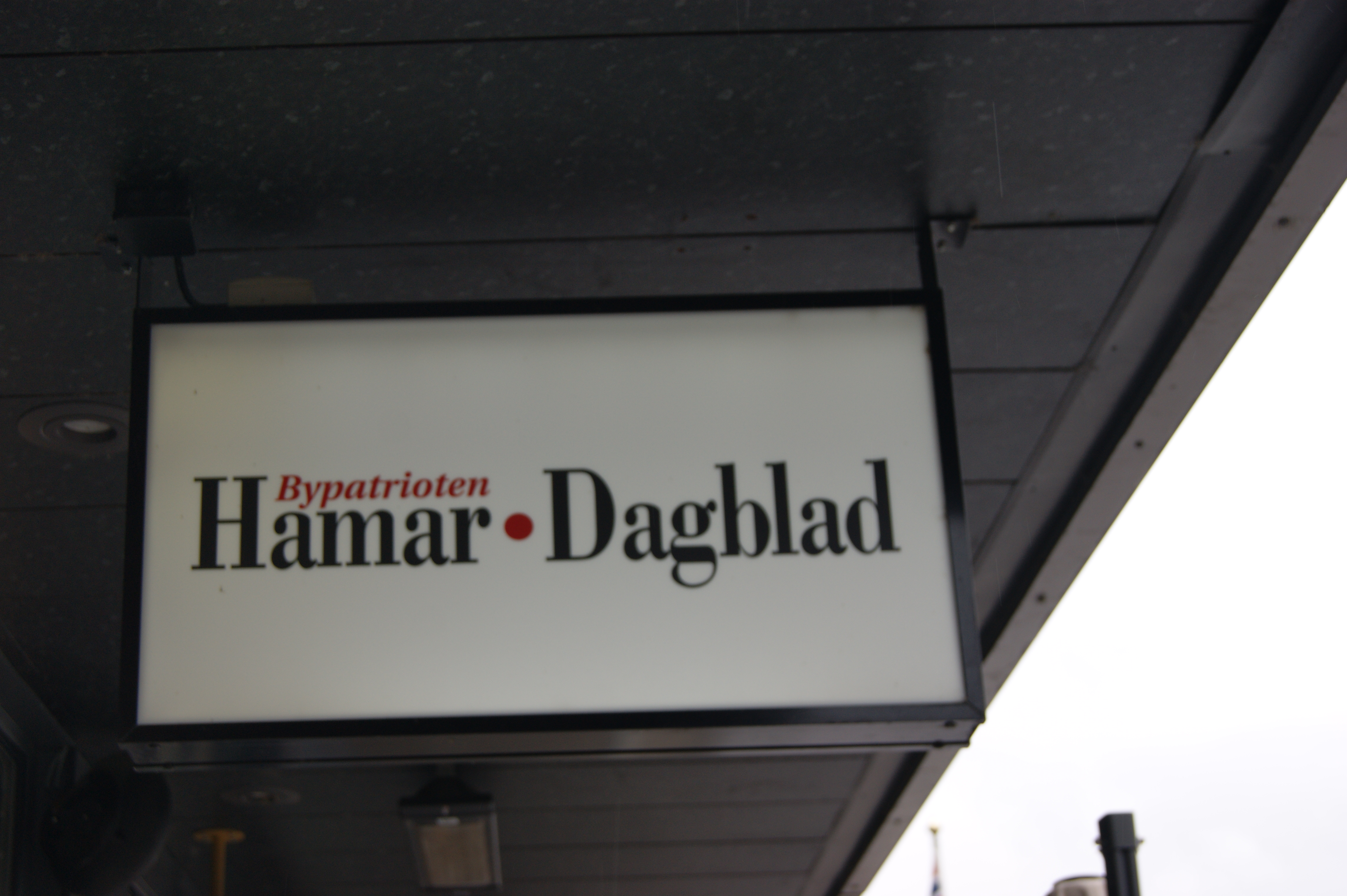
Advertising signs.

Hamar Dagblad (1971-2022) was a weekly, free, local newspaper published in Hamar, Norway. It was part of Edda Media.

The newspaper was first published on 1 December 1971, with three weekly issues. In 2005 it was reorganized from a subscription to free newspaper, and was distributed to 17,000 households in Hamar, Furnes and Ottestad. Tore Svensrud is the editor-in-chief of the newspaper. On 21 June 2022, it was announced that the board of Østlendingen decided to close the newspaper from 1 July of the same year.
