= Nyhedsavisen =

Danish newspaper

- Type: Free daily newspaper
- Format: Compact
- Owner: LundXY
- Founded: October 2006
- Ceased publication: August 2008
- Language: Danish
- Headquarters: Copenhagen, Denmark
- Website: avisen.dk

Nyhedsavisen was a Danish free daily newspaper based on a new concept of distributing a free newspaper to 500,000 Danish homes that became the most read in the country within 18 month of launch. It was owned by investment and advisory catalyst LundXY.

== History ==
Nyhedsavisen was first published on 6 October 2006. In its first year, the paper had a circulation of 160,000 copies. By March 2007, it had a circulation of approximately 400,000 copies.

At its inception, the paper was owned by the Icelandic Baugur Group, with minority stakes held by a number of co-founders, including Morten Lund. However, in January 2008, Baugur decided to sell Lund a 51% majority share of Dagsbrun Media, the holding company for the newspaper. For the acquisition, Lund had teamed up with Morten Wagner of Freeway, an owner of the social networking sites dating.dk and arto.dk. It is believed that they bought the stake for a single Danish crown. At that stage, the newspaper had lost close to $50 million. Rumour has it that Morten Lund assumed this debt.

Detractors pointed out that Nyhedsavisen suffered with funding issues from the outset; at launch, analysts were concerned that Baugur's £45m investment was too small to keep it afloat. It was also reported in the Danish press that the newspaper lost 200m Danish crowns over the course of 2007, before Lund's takeover. However, under new ownership it officially claimed the position of most widely read newspaper in Denmark, with a daily circulation of 551,000 copies and A-Pressen have taken over the news paper's on-line edition.

The paper was closed in August 2008 with a reported deficit of approximately $100 million, generated mostly under the previous ownership, making it another victim of the so-called "newspaper wars" in Denmark.

== See also ==
- 24timer
- Dato (newspaper)
- MetroXpress
- Urban (newspaper)
