= Lokalavisen Favrskov =

Weekly newspaper in Denmark

Lokalavisen Favrskov is a newspaper published in Hadsten, Denmark. It was established in 2018.

It covers the municipality of Favrskov in the Central Denmark Region. The newspaper is published once a week. In 2019, it had a circulation of 28,418.

The newspaper is owned by Politikens Lokalaviser and JP/Politikens Hus.
