= 24timer =

Danish newspaper

- Type: Free daily newspaper
- Format: Compact
- Owner(s): MetroXpress
- Publisher: MetroXpress
- Editor: Claus Johansen
- Founded: 17 August 2006
- Political alignment: None
- Language: Danish
- Ceased publication: 22 March 2013
- Headquarters: Copenhagen, Denmark
- Website: www.24.dk

24timer, literally 24hours, was a Danish free daily newspaper published by MetroXpress.

== History and profile ==
24timer began distribution on 17 August 2006 and it was owned by JP/Politikens Hus.

24timer had a circulation of 395,000 copies in 2006.

Two editions of 24timer were closed in Odense and Aalborg in November 2008. The paper ceased publication on 22 March 2013 when it merged with its sister paper MetroXpress.

== See also ==
- Dato
- MetroXpress
- Nyhedsavisen
- Urban
