= Øieren =

Øieren may refer to:

- An archaic name of the lake Øyeren
- The name of the newspaper Østlandets Blad from 1908 to 1918
