= Kjell Lynau =

Norwegian editor (1922–1983)

Kjell Lynau (22 March 1922 – 21 July 1983) is a Norwegian editor.

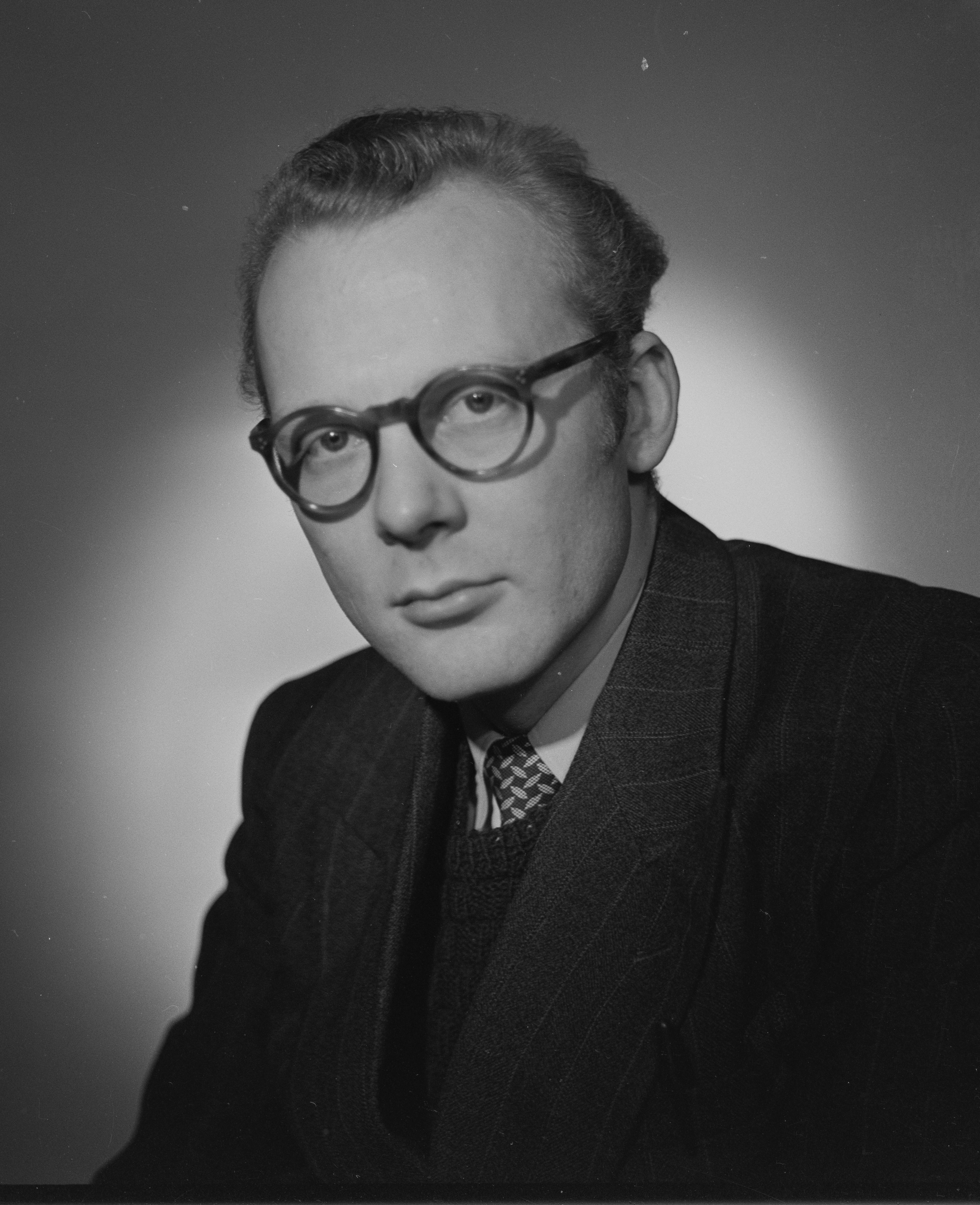
Kjell Lynau's Portrait

He started as a journalist in Nordstrands Blad and Akersposten from 1941 to 1944, then the Norwegian News Agency from 1945 to 1952. He was hired as a subeditor in Billedbladet Nå in 1952 and was the magazine's editor from 1954 to 1983. He also chaired the Periodical Press Association from 1955 to 1960.
