= Andreas Norland =

Norwegian newspaper editor (1935–2021)

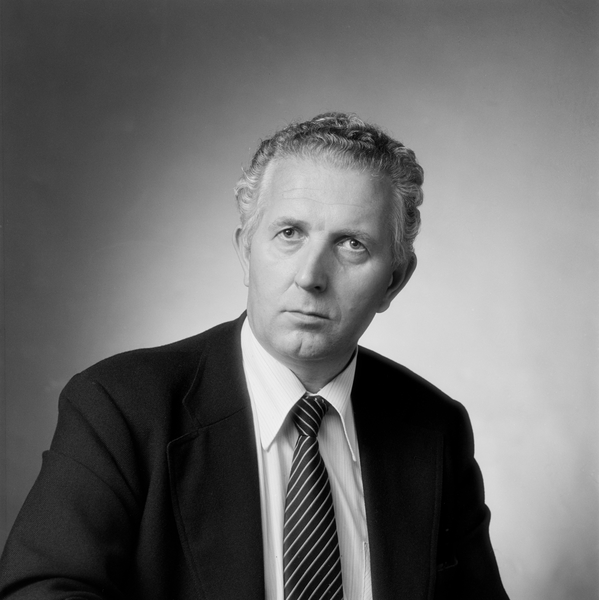
Norland in 1979

Andreas Norland (9 May 1935 – 21 August 2021) was a Norwegian newspaper editor. He was known as editor of three large newspapers Adresseavisen, Verdens Gang and Aftenposten, and also held other positions in the Schibsted media conglomerate.

== Early life ==
Norland was born in Bærum as a son of newspaper editor Realph Norland (1903–1963) and pharmacist Aasta Sigrun Sæther (1903–1968). Following miscellaneous education, he was hired in Tønsbergs Blad in 1958, where his father was editor-in-chief. In September 1959 he married journalist Sonja Hammer. In 1963 he left Tønsbergs Blad for another conservative-leaning newspaper, Aftenposten.

== Later career ==
After ten years in Aftenposten, and then one year as a subeditor in Verdens Gang from 1973 to 1974, Norland was hired as editor-in-chief of Adresseavisen. The newspaper had two chief editors at the time, and his co-editor was Fridtjof Åldstedt. In 1977 he was headhunted to become a new chief editor in Verdens Gang as well as board member of Schibsted. Norland took over for Vegard Sletten, and his co-editor Tim Greve succeeded long-time editor Oskar Hasselknippe.

In 1981 Verdens Gang surpassed Aftenposten to become Norway's largest newspaper. In 1987, Norland left to become editor of the new Schibsted-owned newspaper Osloavisen. Einar Hanseid took over Verdens Gang; from now there was only one chief editor. Reportedly, the idea of a local newspaper in Oslo came from Hanseid. However, Osloavisen was perceived by its owners as a failed venture and was discontinued after less than one year. Norland was brought back to Aftenposten where he succeeded Egil Sundar as editor-in-chief. Norland stepped down in 1993, but worked as an advisor from 1994. He was a board chairman of Schibsteds Forlag, the publishing branch of Schibsted, from 1983 to 2002, and board member of Svenska Dagbladet from 1999. He was the deputy chair of the Norwegian Press Complaints Commission from 1972 to 1974, the Association of Norwegian Editors from 1978 to 1980 and the Conservative Press Association from 1991 to 2001.

He also wrote several books, both fiction (crime novels) and non-fiction. One of the novels, Mord på Stortinget, was dramatized by Radioteatret in 1982. In non-fiction he is known for 1973's Hårde tider, the authoritative history on the Fatherland League, where his father was involved. In 2012 Norland released the two-volume history of Schibsted—Schibsteds historie—the first volume titled Bly blir gull and the second Medier, makt og millioner.

Norland died on 21 August 2021, aged 86.

== Selected works ==
- Bravo, bravo eller Da valgåret gikk i spinn : et ukontrollert lystspill. Illustrated by Jan O. Henriksen. Oslo: Gyldendal. 1977. ISBN 9788205107137. OCLC 5220313.
