= Drammens Tidende =

Norwegian Bokmål language newspaper

- Type: Daily newspaper
- Format: Tabloid
- Owner: Amedia
- Founded: 2 January 1832
- Language: Norwegian (bokmål)
- Headquarters: Drammen, Norway
- Circulation: 29,124 (2013)
- Website: www.dt.no

Drammens Tidende is a Norwegian Bokmål language newspaper published in Drammen, Norway.

== History and profile ==
The former Drammens Tidende dates back to 2 January 1832, when it was known as Tiden, taking the new name in thirteen years later. Buskerud Blad dates back to 3 July 1883 when it was founded as a conservative alternative to Drammens Tidende and Drammens Blad, which were both pro-liberal. BB and DT merged into one company in 1897 after DT was bought by the owner of BB, Axel Lyche. In 1901 Axel Raknerud, the editor of BB since 1884, also became the editor of Drammens Tidende. However, the newspapers remained separate publications, although with the same staff. Not until 1 February 1961 were they united in a common publication and company. The newspaper was known as Drammens Tidende og Buskerud Blad from 1961 to 2000, after a merger between the old Drammens Tidende and Buskerud Blad. The newspaper covers central parts of Buskerud as well as Drammen with seven weekly issues.

The first acquisition of another newspaper occurred 1 December 1972, and in 1975 the offices in Oslo and Hønefoss were closed, followed the year after with a separate newspaper Smånytt fra Røyken og Hurum. In 1978 an offset press was bought, and in 1980 the Notodden-based newspaper Telen. In 1993-94 the newspaper, until then owned by the Lyche and Raknerud families, was sold to Orkla Media, who were purchasing most of the independent newspapers in the country. The online newspaper was launched in 1998, followed by a name change in 2000. The paper was published in broadsheet format until 2004 when it switched to tabloid format. Drammens Tidene was taken over with the rest of Orkla Media by Edda Media in 2006.

The circulation of Drammens Tidende was 45,000 copies in 2003. Its circulation was 40,954 copies in 2007. The paper had a circulation of 37,500 copies in 2009. It was the tenth best-selling newspaper in the country in 2013 with a circulation of 29,124 copies.

== See also ==
- List of oldest companies
