= Tor Tidemand-Fossum =

Norwegian politician (1939–2023)

Tor Fredrik Tidemand-Fossum (2 June 1897 – 21 June 1982) was a Norwegian politician for the Conservative Party.

He grew up at Bekkelaget in Aker. After marrying, he settled in Kolbotn in 1921. He started working in the banking sector, working for Akers Sparebank. He retired at the age of 65 in 1962, but had the opportunity to become director of the local savings bank, Oppegård Sparebank, where he served until 1970.

As a politician, Tidemand-Fossum became elected to Oppegård municipal council in the 1930s, serving as mayor from 1935 to 1937. He also chaired the Conservative Party chapters in Oppegård and in Follo. During the occupation of Norway by Nazi Germany, he was imprisoned in Bredtveit concentration camp from 11 May to 18 July 1942. After the war he was elected as a deputy representative to the Parliament of Norway for Akershus for the term 1954–1957. In total he met during 12 days of parliamentary session.

Tidemand-Fossum held multiple municipal and charitable posts, including a local presidency in the Lions Club. He sat on the supervisory council of Østlandets Blad from 1948 to 1972, being president for the latter decade. He was nicknamed "Tifo". He died in June 1982 and was buried at Kolbotn.
