= Lars Sigurd Sunnanå =

Norwegian journalist

Lars Sigurd Sunnanå (born 28 May 1946) is a Norwegian journalist.

== Personal life ==
Sunnanå was born on the island of Karmøy and grew up in Porsgrunn Municipality. He is a nephew of Klaus Sunnanå. He is married and his son Lars Magne Sunnanå is a former local politician (Conservative) in Bærum Municipality, where the family lives. Lars Sigurd Sunnanå was himself a member of the Norwegian Young Conservatives in his youth. He is also a freemason.

== Career ==
He worked in Varden and Aftenposten in his early career. He was awarded the Narvesen Prize in 1971. In 1972 he was hired by Norwegian Broadcasting Corporation. He was their Middle East correspondent from 1999 to 2003, and in 2010, he began as NRK's Africa correspondent based in Nairobi. His tenure ended in 2013.

In 2004 he wrote the book Saddams fortrolige together with Saddam Hussein's physician Ala Bashir. The book was translated to English, French, Arabic, Danish, Finnish, German, Swedish, Dutch, Estonian, Spanish, Japanese and Russian. In 2005 came Oppdraget. Innsidehistorien om Saddams atomvåpen, about nuclear weapons in Iraq, together with Jafar D. Jafar and Numan Saadaldin al-Niaimi. In 2008 came Skibbrudd. En dokumentar om Redningsselskapets skjulte liv, a critical book about the Norwegian Society for Sea Rescue.

Awards
Preceded by Sverre Mitsem	Recipient of the Narvesen Prize; 1971 (shared with Asbjørn Larsen)	Succeeded by Fædrelandsvennen
Media offices
Preceded by Fritz Nilsen	Norwegian Broadcasting Corporation correspondent in the Middle East; 1999–2003	Succeeded by Odd Karsten Tveit
Preceded by Dag Bredvei	Norwegian Broadcasting Corporation correspondent in Africa; 2010–2013	Succeeded by Christine Præsttun and Sverre Tom Radøy
