= Mediehuset Østfold =

Norwegian media company

- Genre: Media
- Founded: 1989
- Headquarters: Fredrikstad, Norway
- Key people: Petter Christian Saugstad (CEO)
- Owner: Edda Media (99.3%)

Mediehuset Østfold AS is a Norwegian media company. Owned 99.3% by Edda Media, it publishes the Østfold-based newspapers Fredriksstad Blad, Moss Avis and Sarpsborgavisa. It also owns the local radio stations Radio Sarpsborg, Radio Fredrikstad and Radio Moss.

In the spring of 2008, the "best profit margin of all times" was announced, with expectations for an even better fiscal year in 2008. In the autumn of the same year, Edda Media demanded a five percent cut in expenditures.
