= Aalborg Stiftstidende =

Danish daily newspaper (1767–1999)

- Type: Daily newspaper
- Publisher: Aalborg Stiftstidende A/S
- Founded: 2 January 1767
- Ceased publication: 1999
- Language: Danish
- Headquarters: Aalborg
- Country: Denmark

Aalborg Stiftstidende was a Danish language newspaper based in Aalborg, Denmark. The paper was published between 1767 and 1999 and is the predecessor of Nordjyske Stiftstidende.

== History and profile ==
The paper was established by a group of priests in Aalborg in 1767. Its first issue appeared on 2 January that year. The paper was named as Nyttige og fornøyelige Jydske Efterretninger and appeared with this title until 28 December 1770. It was published under different titles between 1771 and 1904 when it was renamed as Aalborg Stiftstidende.

In the 20th-century it became part of the Stiftstidende dailies. The other two Stiftstidende newspapers were published in Odense, Fyens Stiftstidende and in Aarhus, Århus Stiftstidende.

The paper was published by Aalborg Stiftstidende A/S. Aalborg Stiftstidende had no political affiliation, but had a conservative political stance. The paper was close to the Chamber of Industry and Commerce and was a member of the Chamber.

By November 1996 Aalborg Stiftstidende started its website.

The circulation of Aalborg Stiftstidende was 42,622 copies in 1962. During the first half of 1988 it sold 72,857 copies on weekdays and 98,561 copies on Sundays. From 1999 the paper was published under the name Nordjyske Stiftstidende.
