= Sarpsborgavisa =

Norwegian newspaper

- Type: Free newspaper
- Owner(s): Mediehuset Østfold; Edda Media (99.3%)
- Editor: Pål Marthinsen
- Founded: 2002
- Ceased publication: 2009
- Headquarters: Sarpsborg, Norway

Sarpsborgavisa (also SarpsborgAvisa) was a free newspaper published in Sarpsborg, Norway.

It was owned by Mediehuset Østfold, which is owned 99.3% by Edda Media.

It was closed from 31 May 2009.
