= Karsten Isachsen =

Norwegian priest, essayist, and popular speaker

Karsten Einar Isachsen
- Born: 22 February 1944; Oslo, Norway
- Died: 18 January 2016 (aged 71); Ål, Norway
- Occupations: Priest; Essayist

Karsten Einar Isachsen (22 February 1944 – 18 January 2016) was a Norwegian Lutheran priest, essayist and popular speaker.

== Biography ==
Isachsen was born in Oslo to Knut Isachsen and Margit Lolloe Gjertsen. Among his books are the speech and essay collections Gjester som ikke vil gå from 1978, Fjellet som flyttet seg (1979), Vis meg ditt ansikt (1982), and Før vi går fra hverandre from 1987. He was decorated Knight, First Class of the Order of St. Olav in 2014. He died in Ål in 2016.

== Selected works ==
- Sint, sant, sunt. Illustrated by Jan O. Henriksen. Oslo: Cappelen Seminarer for næringslivet. 1990. ISBN 9788202124083. OCLC 1028260333.
- Halvtimesrevyen 1996 sit down comedy med Karsten Isachsen. Illustrated by Jan O. Henriksen. Oslo: Cappelen. 1995. ISBN 9788202157456. OCLC 1028283541.
