= Ivar Frounberg =

Danish composer and organist

Ivar Frounberg (born 12 April 1950) is a Danish composer, organist, and professor emeritus of composition at the Norwegian Academy of Music.

== Life ==
Ivar Frounberg was born in Søborg, and first trained as an organist, graduating in 1976 from the Royal Danish Academy of Music, and later studied composition with Niels Viggo Bentzon and Ib Nørholm the same place, and with Morton Feldman in the USA and Iannis Xenakis in Italy. Ivar Frounberg is a professor emeritus at the Norwegian Academy of Music in Oslo, where he was a senior professor of composition from 2000-2012. He had previously taught as docent of composition and electroacoustic music at the Royal Danish Academy of Music. In 1995 he received the Danish Arts Foundation's three-year grant for the second time as well as the Carl Nielsen Prize.

== Music ==
Frounberg has embraced Xenakis and Feldman's interest in music as abstract structures. Starting with his 1985-work Embryo for amplified violin, string trio, piano, synthesizer, and tape the electronic resources became increasingly important in Frounberg's work, and in 1989 he composed the first large-scale Danish work for a computer, What did the Sirens Sing as Ulysses sailed by? which is composed for live-electronics and orchestra. The music is deliberately ambiguous – its title referring to a riddle based on the twelfth book of Homer's Odyssey: If anyone heard the sirens sing, they died – except for Ulysses, who never told anyone what he had heard. So there is no way of knowing what they actually sang. According to Frounberg, this paradox accurately describes how music is experienced in today's media world. Several parts of What did the Sirens Sing as Ulysses sailed by? are openly structured, allowing the conductor to combine different musical elements, therefore the work will sound different each time it is played
