= Kristoffer Eriksen =

Danish journalist (born 1986)

- Born: August 7, 1986 (age 39); Søborg
- Occupations: Journalist, tv-host, news editor
- Employer(s): formerly Radio24syv and DR And Ekstra Bladet

Kristoffer Eriksen (born 7 August 1986 in Søborg) is a Danish journalist, editor and TV-host.

== Career ==
Eriksen finished a degree as journalist from Danish School of Media and Journalism in 2011. In 2013, he hosted the controversial satirical program Absurdistan, who was sent on DR3. In the program, he and co-host Jeppe Juhl made a number of fake happenings, including launching a fake night club only for beautiful people. News about it was picked up by a number of serious media outlets, not knowing it was a hoax. From 2013 to 2014, he was a reporter for Sunday Live on DR2. In 2014, he and Juhl hosted Hyklerriget, on DR3. In 2016 he made the documentary Super Rich in the Slum, sent on DR3.

Eriksen worked as morning host on Radio24syv for three years. In 2016, the morning program, hosted by Eriksen and Kaare Svejstrup, was named that year's best news program, and an interview by them as the interview of the year. In November 2017, it was announced that he, along with Camilla Stampe, would host the fact-checking program Detector on DR, starting in the beginning of 2018. Later in November, he quit Radio24syv with immediate effect, because the radio decided to apologize to Claus Oxfeldt, chairman of the police trade union. Oxfeldt had boycotted the radio for 8 months, because Eriksen on Twitter had said he was "full of lies". In September 2018 he returned to Radio24syv as news editor. When the radio station applied for renewal of their broadcasting license, Eriksen was to become channel chief instead of Mikael Bertelsen and Mads Brügger, but the station did not win the procurement and closed in October 2019.

In December 2019, he became editor-in-chief of the investigative section of Ekstra Bladet, starting in January 2020 and stopping May 19 2021.
