= Jan O. Henriksen =

Norwegian illustrator and editorial cartoonist

- Born: Jan Oddvar Henriksen; 3 May 1945; Andøya, Norway
- Died: 26 August 2018 (aged 73); Trondheim, Norway
- Occupation: Illustrator

Jan O. Henriksen (3 May 1945 – 26 August 2018) was a Norwegian illustrator and editorial cartoonist.

== Biography ==
Born in Andøya, a self-trained artist, Henriksen worked as illustrator and cartoonist for Adresseavisen from 1966 to 1967, for Fædrelandsvennen from 1967 to 1974, for Aftenposten from 1985 to 1987, and for Adresseavisen from 1987. He illustrated a number of books, including humour books by the signature Tande-P, and his cartoon series Nazismens fremvekst/Norge i krig was published in 1981 and 1982.

He died in Trondheim on 26 August 2018, 73 years old.

== Selected works ==
- Bravo, bravo eller Da valgåret gikk i spinn : et ukontrollert lystspill. Andreas Norland. Oslo: Gyldendal. 1977. ISBN 9788205107137. OCLC 5220313.
- Den norske oljesjel : kåseri. Ivar Eskeland. Oslo: Aventura. 1985. ISBN 9788258803703. OCLC 14128557.
- År-sår 85. Tande-P. Oslo: Athenuem. 1985. ISBN 9788273341204. OCLC 19300539.
- Sint, sant, sunt. Karsten Isachsen. Oslo: Cappelen Seminarer for næringslivet. 1990. ISBN 9788202124083. OCLC 1028260333.
- Jan O. - en passant. Trondheim: Adresseavisens forlag. 1995. ISBN 9788271640392. OCLC 1028328957.
- Halvtimesrevyen 1996 sit down comedy med Karsten Isachsen. Karsten Isachsen. Oslo: Cappelen. 1995. ISBN 9788202157456. OCLC 1028283541.
