= Herning Folkeblad =

Danish local newspaper

- Founder: Mediehuset Herning Folkeblad
- Founded: 2 July 1869
- Language: Danish
- Headquarters: Herning
- Country: Denmark
- Sister newspapers: Midtjyllands Avis; Ikast Avis; Skive Folkeblad
- Website: Herning Folkeblad

Herning Folkeblad is a newspaper based in Herning, Denmark. It has been in circulation since 1869.

== History and profile ==
The paper was first published on 2 July 1869 under the name Vestjylland eller Herning Folkeblad. Mediehuset Herning Folkeblad is the owner of Herning Folkeblad. The company also owns Midtjyllands Avis, Ikast Avis and Skive Folkeblad which was acquired by the company in September 2020. Herning Folkeblad was formerly owned by a family company.

The headquarters of Herning Folkeblad is in Herning. The paper cooperates with the Herning Public Library with which it shares the same building.

Although Herning Folkeblad has no political affiliation, it has a right-wing tradition, and in the 1970s it had a liberal political stance.

During the first half of 1966 Herning Folkeblad sold 15,700 copies.
