= Fritz Nilsen =

Norwegian journalist

Fritz Nilsen (22 July 1939 – 30 November 2000) was a Norwegian journalist.

He was born in Sandnessjøen, and studied literature at the University of Oslo and the University of Bergen. He was hired in the 1960s as a secretary for the Socialist People's Party parliamentary group. He then worked in the Norwegian News Agency, and in 1971 he was hired in the Norwegian Broadcasting Corporation. He was their correspondent in East Asia, stationed in Singapore from 1979 to 1983. He worked two years in Norway before becoming correspondent in Beijing. He reported from the Tiananmen Square protests of 1989. He was later the Norwegian Broadcasting Corporation's Middle East correspondent from 1994 to 1999. The headquarters were in Cairo and Amman.

At home in Norway, Nilsen also chaired the local trade union branch. He wrote several books, mostly about topics he had researched as a foreign correspondent, but also about socialist politics in Norway. His last book, the travel guide Jerusalem, was released posthumously in 2001. He resided in Nesodden and died in November 2000. Before his death he was considered for the Socialist Left Party ballot in the 2001 Norwegian parliamentary election.

Media offices
Preceded by position created	Norwegian Broadcasting Corporation correspondent in Singapore; 1979–1983	Succeeded by Bjørn Egil Eide
Preceded by Gunnar Høidahl	Norwegian Broadcasting Corporation correspondent in Beijing; 1985–1989	Succeeded by Siv Nordrum
Preceded by Odd Karsten Tveit	Norwegian Broadcasting Corporation correspondent in the Middle East; 1994–1999	Succeeded by Lars Sigurd Sunnanå
