= The Copenhagen Post =

Danish English-language newspaper

- Type: Weekly newspaper
- Format: Tabloid
- Owner: CPHPOST.DK ApS
- Publisher: Jesper Skeel
- Editor: Bernardo Basilici Menini
- Founded: November 1997
- Political alignment: Neutral
- Language: English
- Headquarters: Copenhagen, Denmark
- Circulation: 12,000–15,000
- Price: DKK 20 / free online
- Website: cphpost.dk

The Copenhagen Post, also stylized CPH Post, is a newspaper providing Danish news in English both nationally and internationally; it is the only English-language newspaper printed regularly in Denmark.

== History and profile ==
Founded by San Shepherd in 1997, the first printed edition of The Copenhagen Post shipped in February 1998. Since the year 2000, The Copenhagen Post has been published by Ejvind Sandal. In 2002, Jesper Nymark stepped in as CEO. Hans Hermansen is the current CEO as of 2018.

As of 2024, the current editor-in-chief is Bernardo Basilici Menini

== Content ==
The Copenhagen Post has been engaged in editorial cooperation with national news service Ritzaus Bureau and daily newspaper Jyllands-Posten, as well as supplying daily news in English to the Danish Ministry of Foreign Affairs, the European Commission, and Jyllands-Posten.

Content typically includes politics, business, education, finance, and general news. Each week the paper includes a comprehensive In & Out entertainment guide founded in May 1998 by Thomas Dalvang Fleurquin (Guide Editor 1998–2008).

In addition to the weekly newspaper that can be subscribed to, The Copenhagen Post can be bought at newsstands and found for free at certain locations such as the Copenhagen Airport. Hardcopy subscribers can also download a password secured PDF copy of the newspaper from the website.
