= Moss Avis =

Local newspaper in Moss, Norway

- Type: Daily newspaper
- Format: Tabloid (1989–present)
- Owner: Mediehuset Østfold
- Editor: Jan Tollefsen
- Founded: 1876
- Political alignment: Non-partisan
- Headquarters: Moss, Norway
- Circulation: 14,979
- Website: www.moss-avis.no

Moss Avis is a local newspaper in Moss, Norway. Having a rivalry with Moss Dagblad, it is published six days a week. The chief editor is Pål Enghaug.

It was established in 1876, and became affiliated with the Liberal Party. It later shifted to the right before becoming non-partisan. It was originally published three times a week, but this was expanded to six times in 1931. It changed to tabloid format in 1989, and launched its Internet site in 1999. Between 1998 and 2008 it was published seven times a week.

In addition to Moss, the newspaper covers Rygge, Råde, Våler, Son and Hobøl. It has a circulation of 14,979, of whom 14,703 are subscribers. It is owned by Mediehuset Østfold, which is owned 99.3% by Edda Media.
