= North Media =

North Media A/S
- Company type: A/S
- Industry: Media
- Founder: Richard Bunck
- Headquarters: Søborg, Denmark
- Key people: Ole Borch(Chairman of the Board); Kåre Wigh(Group Executive Director & CFO); Andreas Hald (CEO FK Distribution); Lasse Ingemann Brodt (Group CEO
- Revenue: DKK 995.3 million (2022)
- Operating income: DKK 532.9 million (2022)
- Net income: DKK 2.1 million (2022)
- Total assets: DKK 1,211.3 million (2022)
- Total equity: DKK 995.4 million (2022)
- Number of employees: 420 (2022)
- Website: northmedia.dk

North Media is a Danish media group. It owns the distribution company FK Distribution, BoligPortal, Ofir, and Bekey.

== History ==
Richard Bunck founded FK Distribution in 1965 and Søndagsavisen in 1978. The two companies were merged under the name Søndasavisen a-s in 1990 and the company was listed on the Copenhagen Stock Exchange in 1996 and changed its name to North Media in 2010. In October 2013, it acquired eight local newspapers in the Copenhagen area from Berlingske Media.

== Activities ==
- North Media A/S

=== FK Distribution ===
- FK Distribution
- Minetilbud.dk

=== North Media Online ===
- BoligPortal.dk
- BostadsPortal.se
- Ofir.dk
- MatchWork.com

=== Bekey ===
- Bekey

=== Investments ===
- Lead Supply
