= Varden (newspaper) =

Norwegian newspaper

- Type: Daily newspaper (two days a week 1874–88) (three days a week 1888–95)
- Format: Tabloid (2001–present)
- Editor: Eirik Haugen
- Founded: 1874
- Political alignment: Liberal (1874–1953); Conservative (1953–?); Independent
- Headquarters: Skien, Norway
- Circulation: 16,662
- Website: www.varden.no

Varden (Norwegian: Varden, lit. 'The Cairn') is a regional newspaper published in Skien, Norway.

== History and profile ==
The newspaper was first established with a test issue on 17 December 1874, with Johan C. T. Castberg as its first editor-in-chief. It has been published daily since 1895, and in the tabloid format since 2001. As of August 2026, the newspaper's editor-in-chief is Eirik Haugen.

Originally, Varden was owned by individuals. Harald Kristoffersen, its editor-in-chief and owner from 1901, created the limited company AS Varden in 1918. The corporation Orkla Media, later sold to the British media group Mecom and renamed Edda Media, bought the newspaper in 1994. In 2012, Edda Media was acquired by A-pressen, and Varden was sold to Agderposten Medier because Telemarksavisa, Varden's main competitor, was owned by the same company. Agderposten Media and Polaris Media established Polaris Media Sør in 2020.

Through the publishing company Varden AS, Varden itself had a 100% ownership of the smaller newspapers Kanalen (published in Nome), Kragerø Blad Vestmar (Kragerø) and Telen (Notodden) until 2012. Varden itself has had local offices both in Kragerø and Notodden, as well as in Bamble, Porsgrunn, Kviteseid, Bø and Rjukan. Today, only the Bø office persists.

The leading newspaper in Telemark county for many years, Varden was surpassed by Telemark Arbeiderblad in 1974, only to regain the number one spot in 1988. Telemark Arbeiderblad was later renamed Telemarksavisa, and surpassed Varden once again in 2017.

At the time Varden was established, newspapers in Norway had close ties with political parties.Varden was special in that it changed political allegiance from Liberal to Conservative, in 1953. The ties between political parties and newspapers no longer exist. Today, the newspaper classifies itself as an "independent" newspaper which works to promote a liberal and democratic society with respect for individual rights, social fairness and free enterprise.

As of 2023, Varden had a circulation of 16,662.
