= Einar Hanseid =

Norwegian newspaper editor (born 1943)

Einar Hanseid (born 19 November 1943) is a Norwegian retired newspaper editor.

== Biography ==
Hanseid was born in Sandefjord, Norway. He started as a journalist in Sandefjords Blad from 1965 to 1966 and was the subeditor of Bondebladet from 1966 to 1968. He was then hired in Dagbladet. After serving as editorial chief he was hired as the news editor of Verdens Gang in 1984. He was promoted to editor-in-chief in 1987, serving until 1993. He was then the editor-in-chief of Aftenposten from 1994 to 2003, and finished his career as an adviser in Schibsted.

Media offices
Preceded by Andreas Norland	Chief editor of Verdens Gang; 1987–1993	Succeeded by Bernt Olufsen
Preceded by Andreas Norland	Chief editor of Aftenposten; 1994–2003	Succeeded by Hans Erik Matre
