= Østlendingen =

Daily, regional newspaper published in Elverum, Norway

Østlendingen is a daily, regional newspaper published in Elverum, Norway. With a circulation of 19,000, it covers the regions of Østerdalen, Solør, Glåmdalen, Trysil, and Engerdal. The newspaper is controlled by Edda Media.
