= Local newspapers in Oslo =

Newspapers published in Oslo, Norway

As the capital of Norway, Oslo holds the headquarters of most national newspapers in Norway. On the other hand, there have been discussions on the lack of local newspapers covering the communities and day-to-day affairs of the boroughs of Oslo. At various times, there have been efforts to prop up local newspapers. The 1920s saw a wave of establishments which restricted themselves to covering specific outer boroughs of the former Aker municipality. The early 21st century saw several new borough-specific newspapers emerge, alongside some publications seeking to cover the politics of the city as a whole.

Throughout the 1990s and 2000s, the two main competitors were Schibsted, which owned Aftenposten Aften, and a company called Lokalavisene Oslo. At the time, Lokalavisene Oslo published the Nordstrands Blad, Østkantavisa, Lokalavisen Groruddalen, Lokalavisen Frogner/St. Hanshaugen, Nordre Aker Budstikke and Ullern Avis Akersposten. The company employed two editors-in-chief who were responsible for three newspapers each.

Both Aftenposten Aften and the mini-conglomerate Lokalavisene Oslo went defunct, the latter after a series of ownership changes.

Odd Einar Dørum, who became a city councilman in 2011 after serving for decades as a national politician, noticed a tangible lack of journalism covering Oslo City Council affairs.

== Old Aker newspapers ==
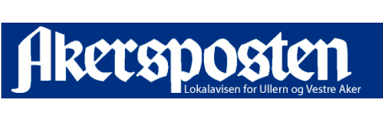
Akersposten.no's logo

The western boroughs of Ullern and Vestre Aker were served by two borough-specific newspapers: Akersposten, first published in 1905, and Ullern Avis, first published in 1933. These were boroughs of Aker municipality which was incorporated into Oslo. In 1977 they merged to form Ullern Avis/Akersposten. From the early 1980s to 1992 the Norwegian national daily Dagbladet owned the newspaper, followed by several other owners over the next decades. In 2002 the newspaper was sold again, and the name changed to Akersposten. In 2006, then part of Edda Media, Akersposten became a free, weekly newspaper. In December 2014 the then-owner Mediehuset dittOslo AS (owned by Amedia) decided to close the newspaper. In early 2016 three former employees relaunched the newspaper as an online newspaper only under the name Akersposten.no.

Nordstrands Blad was established in 1925 to cover the eastern Aker borough of Nordstrand. It was disestablished in the 1930s, and reestablished a few years later. The newspaper has a circulation of 6,240 in 2008.

Akers Avis Groruddalen serves the Groruddalen boroughs. Akers Avis Groruddalen was founded in 1928. Then, Groruddalen was a rural community of Østre Aker borough in Aker municipality, but the valley Groruddalen was heavily urbanized in the post-war period. The paper was eventually published twice per week. The 2003 circulation of Akers Avis Groruddalen was 12,536 copies. It was 13,122 copies in 2012.

== Newer establishments ==
St. Hanshaugen/Frogner Budstikke was established by Lokalavisene Oslo in 1992 to cover the two inner west-end boroughs of Frogner and St. Hanshaugen. Published weekly, they were really two identical newspapers with slightly different content, depending on the borough. St. Hanshaugen/Frogner Budstikke was bought by Orkla Media in 2003 and Edda Media (Mecom) in 2006, being renamed Lokalavisen Frogner/St.Hanshaugen. Amedia bought Mecom's newspapers in 2011, and discontinued every one in 2015.

Orkla Media established Nordre Aker Budstikke in 2004. The newspaper was free and weekly. It too was acquired by Edda Media in 2006 and then Amedia from 2011 to 2015. However Nordre Aker Budstikke was not closed, but taken over by Lokalmedia AS and run as an online-only newspaper.

== Citywide newspapers ==
Osloavisen was published between 1987 and 1988. It was owned by Schibsted, and established in 1987. Its first and only editor-in-chief was Andreas Norland. Reportedly, the idea of a local newspaper in Oslo came from Einar Hanseid, who succeeded Norland in the position he left behind; as chief editor of Verdens Gang. Osloavisen existed for eight months before Schibsted shut it down, and the conglomerate reportedly lost 80 million kr.

Aftenposten was a morning newspaper that ran an evening edition, Aftenposten Aften, specializing on Oslo affairs. The evening was discontinued in 2012. Strictly, Aftenposten Aften also covered Bærum, Nedre Romerike and parts of Follo, making it a regional newspaper for Greater Oslo and not a local newspaper.

In 2017, the newspaper Vårt Oslo ("Our Oslo") was started to rectify the situation where Oslo-based newspapers allegedly only covered national affairs. In 2020, Amedia started a competitor, the online-only newspaper Avisa Oslo.
