= Telen =

Norwegian newspaper

- Telen on 7 July 2008
- Type: Daily local newspaper
- Format: Tabloid
- Owner: Varden
- Language: Norwegian
- Headquarters: Notodden, Norway
- Circulation: 5,114
- Website: www.varden.no

Telen is a Norwegian daily local newspaper published in Notodden, Norway. The paper covers news in Hjartdal Municipality, Notodden Municipality, and Midt-Telemark Municipality. It has a circulation of 5,142 (2007) and owned by the Skien-newspaper Varden, a subsidiary of Edda Media.
