= Support Initiative for Liberty and Democracy =

Silba - Initiative for Dialogue and Democracy is a Danish cross political non-governmental youth organization founded in 1994 by a group of Danish politicians, with Bertel Haarder as the prime initiator. Silba was originally founded as a political, liberal movement with aims to support the new democracies in Estonia, Latvia and Lithuania, with which Denmark had previous relations before World War II and the subsequent Cold War.

Silba has expanded the scope of its operations several times since its inception. The focus area was expanded to include all of Eastern Europe in the early 2000s, and has once again been expanded to include the entire world in 2017. It has moved from being a politically liberal movement to being a cross political NGO, with sister branches in the Netherlands and Norway. The main objectives of Silba are to promote democracy and civil liberties across the world and strengthening cultural ties between Eastern and Western Europe.

Silba operates on three levels: the local level, the national level and the international level.

Silba has 6 local branches located in large Danish cities, generally tied to universities, where events are regularly held for willing participants. These range from primarily social events to lectures and debates. On the national level, Silba organizes competence-building workshops for members to expand their knowledge on various subjects. Internationally, Silba organizes election observation missions and international seminars. Since 2003, Silba has completed more than 53 election observation missions in over 17 countries, including Hungary, Kyrgyzstan and Armenia.
