= Berlingske =

Daily newspaper in Denmark

- Front page on 14 December 2009
- Type: Daily newspaper (since 1841)
- Format: Compact
- Owner: Berlingske Media
- Publisher: Berlingske Tidende A/S
- Editor: Tom Jensen
- Founded: 3 January 1749; 277 years ago
- Political alignment: Conservative
- Language: Danish
- Headquarters: Copenhagen, Denmark
- Circulation: 96,897 (2011)
- Website: berlingske.dk

Berlingske, previously known as Berlingske Tidende (Danish: [ˈpɛɐ̯le̝ŋskə ˈtsʰiːðn̩ə], 'Berling's Times'), is a Danish national daily newspaper based in Copenhagen. It is considered a newspaper of record for Denmark. First published on 3 January 1749, Berlingske is Denmark's oldest continually operating newspaper and among the oldest newspapers in the world.

== History and profile ==
Berlingske was founded by Denmark's Royal Book Printer Ernst Henrich Berling and originally titled Kjøbenhavnske Danske Post-Tidender, then the Berlingskes Politiske og Avertissements Tidende. The paper was supported by the Conservative Party. Until 1903 it had the official right to publish news about the government. In 1936, the newspaper's title was shortened to Berlingske Tidende.

Mendel Levin Nathanson twice served as the editor-in-chief of the paper: between 1838 and 1858 and between 1866 and 1868. The publisher is Det Berlingske Officin.

The paper has a conservative stance and has no political partisan affiliation. Due to its traditionalism and its offices on the Pilestræde, it is known by the nickname Tanten i Pilestræde ("Aunt in Pilestræde").

The paper is also one of the "big three" broadsheet-quality newspapers in Denmark along with Jyllands-Posten and Politiken. Traditionally itself a broadsheet, Berlingske has been published in the tabloid/compact format since 28 August 2006.

Berlingske has won many awards. It is the only newspaper in the world to have won the World Press Photo Award 3 times. It also won the most prestigious journalistic award in Denmark, the Cavling prize, in 2009. In addition, it was awarded the European Newspaper of the Year in the category of national newspaper by the European Newspapers Congress in 2012.

Following a long period of ownership by the Berling family, the whole Berlingske-group was acquired in 1982 by a group of investors from the Danish corporate establishment including Danske Bank and A.P. Møller Mærsk. This takeover saved the group from an impending bankruptcy caused by a long strike period as well as dwindling circulation and advertising revenues.

In 2000, Det Berlingske Officin was acquired by the Norwegian industrial conglomerate Orkla Group; the Danish organization was integrated within a multinational Orkla Media group. In 2006 Orkla Media was sold to the British Mecom Group.

In January 2011, the newspaper's title was abbreviated to Berlingske following a large-scale redesign of the newspaper's web and digital presence.

In February 2015, Berlingske was acquired by the family-owned Belgian media company De Persgroep together with the rest of Mecom Group.

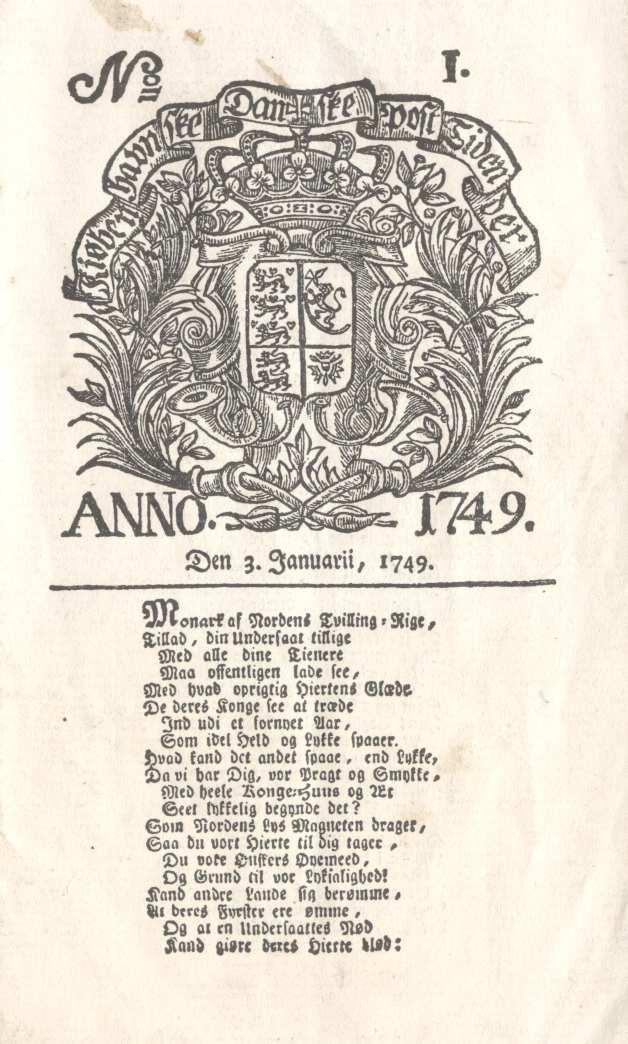
The historic first cover page of Berlingske (1749)

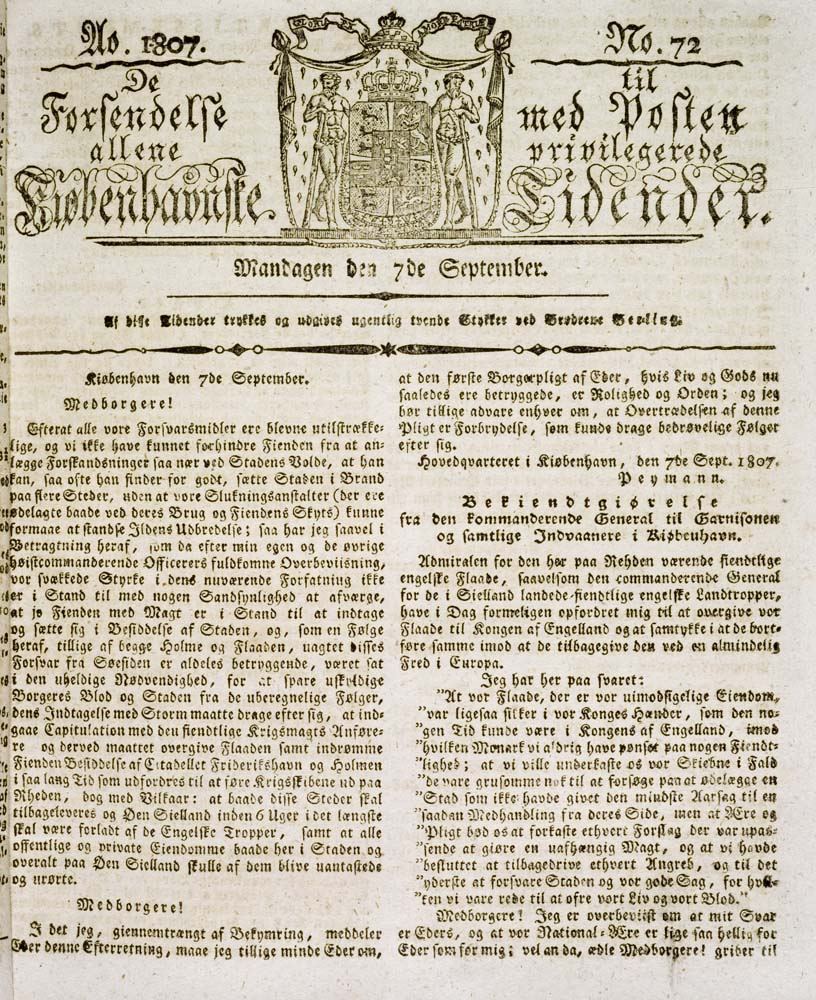
The cover page of Berlingske September 7, 1807 (Royal Danish Library)

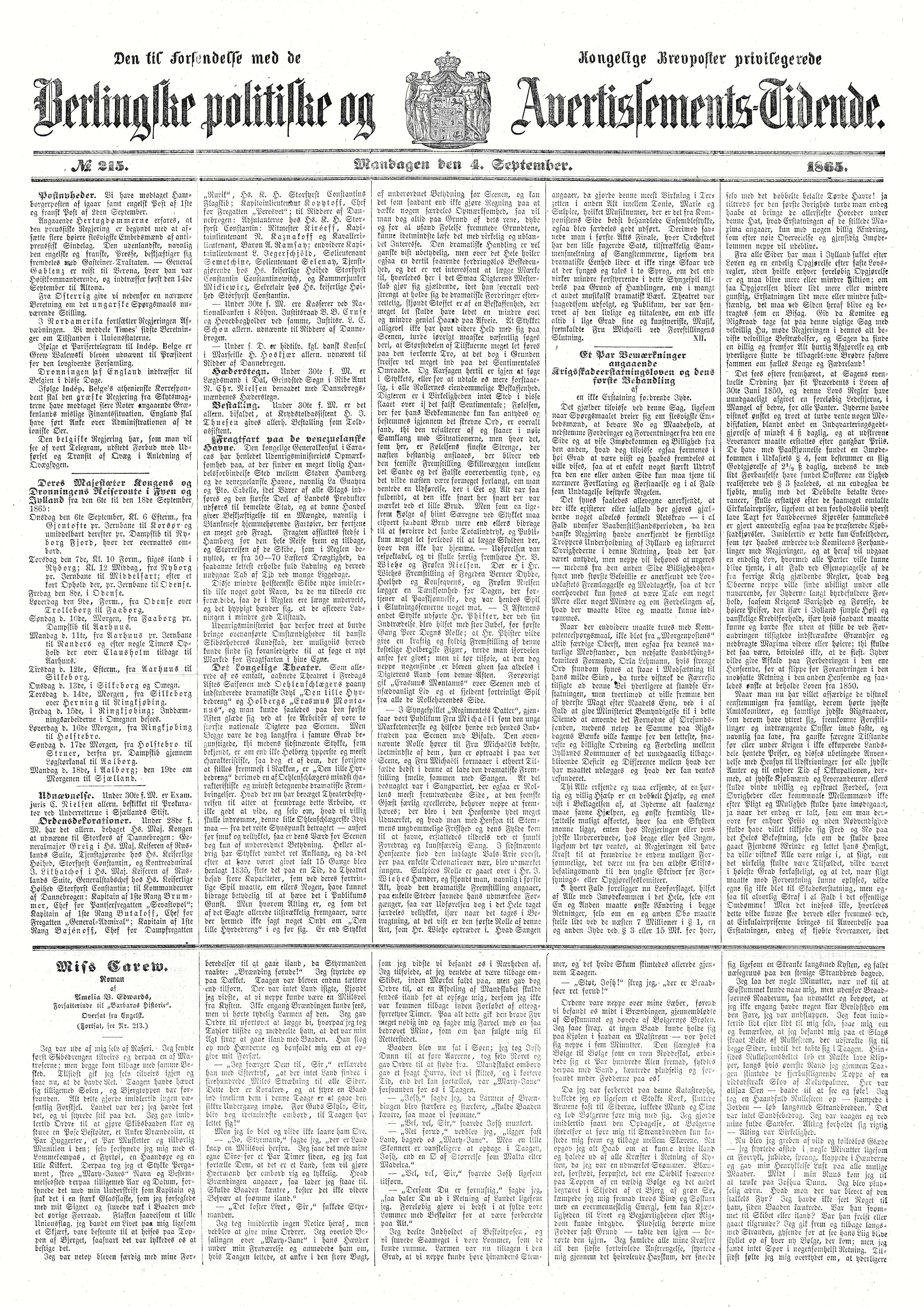
The cover page of Berlingske September 4, 1865 (Royal Danish Library)

== Circulation ==
In 1910 Berlingske Tidende had a circulation of 8,500 copies. During the last six months of 1957 the paper had a circulation of 157,932 copies on weekdays.

It was the second best-selling newspaper in Denmark with a circulation of 149,000 copies in 2002. The circulation of the paper was 142,000 copies in 2003, making it again the second best-selling Danish newspaper. In 2004 the paper had a circulation of 129,000 copies. The circulation of Berlingske was 103,685 copies in 2008 and 103,221 copies in 2009. It was 101,121 copies in 2010 and fell to 96,897 copies in 2011. In 2022, Berlingske Media shut down its printing branch "Trykkompagniet", and outsourced physical printing.

== See also ==
- List of newspapers in Denmark
- List of oldest companies
