= Urban (newspaper) =

URBAN
- Type: Free daily newspaper
- Format: Compact
- Owner: Det Berlingske Officin A/S
- Publisher: Berlingske Gratisaviser A/S
- Editor: Dorthe Carlsen
- Founded: 24 September 2001
- Ceased publication: 12 January 2012
- Political alignment: None
- Language: Danish
- Headquarters: Copenhagen, Denmark
- Price: Free
- Website: www.urbanavis.dk

Urban was a Danish free daily newspaper owned by Det Berlingske Officin.

== History and profile ==
Urban was launched on 24 September 2001, shortly after the competing free daily MetroXpress (the Danish edition of the Metro newspaper).

In its first year Urban had a circulation 108,000 copies. It was 181,000 copies in 2002 and 171,000 copies in 2003. Urban had a circulation of 330,000 copies both in 2006 and in 2007. The circulation in second half of 2008 was 196,752.

Urban was closed on 12 January 2012.

== See also ==
- List of newspapers in Denmark
