= Helsingør Dagblad =

Danish regional newspaper

- Type: Regional newspaper
- Format: Broadsheet
- Owner: North Media
- Founder: Henrik Donatzky
- Publisher: Søndagsavisen A/S
- Founded: 1867
- Language: Danish
- Headquarters: Helsingør
- Country: Denmark
- Sister newspapers: Søndagsavisen
- Website: Helsingør Dagblad

Helsingør Dagblad is a Danish language local newspaper based in Helsingør, Denmark. Founded in 1867 it is one of the oldest newspapers in the country.

== History and profile ==
Helsingør Dagblad was established by Henrik Donatzky, a publisher, in 1867. The paper is part of North Media and is published by Søndagsavisen A/S which is also the publisher of Søndagsavisen. It was formerly published by the Helsingør Dagblad A/S Group. Søndagsavisen A/S had a stake in the company until 2009 when it purchased the company from Dansk AvisTryk A/S. The paper is published in North Zealand.

In 2013 Helsingør Dagblad and Swedish local paper Helsingborgs Dagblad initiated a cooperation to share their sources, but the project was ended soon due to the financial problems. In March 2017 Dorthe Carlsen was appointed director of the paper, replacing Svein Gilbu in the post.
