= Skive Folkeblad =

Danish local daily newspaper

- Founder(s): Mediehuset Herning Folkeblad
- Editor-in-chief: Ole Dall
- Founded: 2 October 1880
- Language: Danish
- Headquarters: Skive
- Country: Denmark
- Sister newspapers: Midtjyllands Avis; Ikast Avis; Herning Folkeblad
- Website: Skive Folkeblad

Skive Folkeblad is a Danish-language daily local newspaper based in Skive, Denmark. It has been in circulation since 1880.

== History and profile ==
Skive Folkeblad was launched in 1880, and its first issue appeared on 2 October that year. The paper is headquartered in Skive and serves the Skive Municipality, parts of the Viborg Municipality and parts of the Holstebro Municipality.

From its start in 1880 to 1908 Skive Folkeblad was affiliated with the Venstre party and adopted a classical liberal stance. From 1908 it became close to the Radikale Venstre party adopting a social liberal stance. During the 1950s under the Cold War conditions it was one of the Danish publications which expressed negative neutralism which was similar to German nihilism.

Skive Folkeblad was an independent newspaper until September 2020 when the Mediehuset Herning Folkeblad acquired the paper which also owns other local newspapers, including Herning Folkeblad and Midtjyllands Avis. As of 2021 Ole Dall was the editor-in-chief of Skive Folkeblad.

In February 2021 Skive Folkeblad was redesigned, and its content was expanded. The paper also began to publish weekly supplements.

== Circulation ==
In its first year Skive Folkeblad sold just 500 copies. Then its circulation gradually increased. It was 2,800 copies in 1901 and 7,000 copies in 1933. The circulation of the paper was 10,100 copies in 1953, 13,300 copies in 1973 and 13,800 in 1993. It had a circulation of 12,300 copies in 2005.
