= Ballerup Bladet =

Danish newspaper

Ballerup Bladet (English: The Ballerup Paper) is a small weekly newspaper, based in the city of Ballerup near Copenhagen, Denmark. Ballerup Bladet A/S, a subsidiary of Dansk AvisTryk A/S, is the publisher of the paper.
