= Edda Media =

Norwegian media group

Edda Media AS
- Company type: Subsidiary
- Industry: Mass media
- Founded: 1983 as Orkla Media
- Headquarters: Oslo, Norway
- Area served: Norway
- Key people: Karl Gunnar Opdal (CEO)
- Revenue: ▲NOK 2,558 million (2006)
- Operating income: NOK 316 million (2006)
- Number of employees: 1,801 (2006)
- Parent: Mecom Group
- Website: eddamedia.no

Edda Media was a Norwegian media group that owned a number of Norwegian newspapers, television channels, radio channels and websites. The company was part of the Mecom Group and was the remaining domestic part of Orkla Media. In 2006 the newspapers in the Edda Group had 1,250,000 daily readers, a circulation of 257,128 and 800,000 unique web users. The corporation had 1,801 employees and head office in Oslo.

Among the newspapers owned are Drammens Tidende, Fjordenes Tidende, Fjuken, Fredriksstad Blad, Gjengangeren, Haugesunds Avis, Indre Østfold Avis, Kanalen, Kragerø Blad, Lierposten, Laagendalsposten, Nordstrands Blad, Moss Avis, Romsdals Budstikke, Røyken og Hurums Avis, Sande Avis, Sandefjords Blad, Sarpsborgavisa, Sunnmørsposten, Svelviksposten, Telen, Tønsbergs Blad, Ullern Avis Akersposten, Varden, Vikebladet Vestposten, Vigga and Åndalsnes Avis. The company owns Lokalavisene Oslo and also has partial ownership of Budstikka (31.5%), Gudbrandsdølen Dagningen, (24%), Hamar Dagblad (66.9%), Ringsaker Blad (66.9%), Østlandets Blad (79.9%) and Østlendingen (66.9%). Among the television channels are TV Buskerud and TV Vestfold. The websites are organized under Edda Digital and consist of 27 online newspapers as dt.no (Drammens Tidende), sb.no (Sandefjords Blad), tb.no (Tønsbergs Blad) and ostlendingen.no (Østlendingen), and commercial services as tinde.no, toppfotballkort.no and opoint.no,

== History ==
Edda Media dates back to 1983 when the Orkla Group entered the mass media market through the company Orkla Communications, later Orkla Media. The company acquired through the 1980s and 1990s a number of smaller, independent newspapers and local television channels throughout the country, and quickly became one of the big three within the newspaper market in Norway, along with Schibsted and A-Pressen. In 2005 Orkla announced it would leave the media market, and sold its shares in Adresseavisen and Bergens Tidende. The remaining stakes, were sold to Mecom Media, and the company split into three holding companies: Edda Media, Berlingske Officin and Rzeczpospolita. Edda Media retained the Norwegian portfolio of media. Edda media was sold in 2012 to Amedia.
