= Tønsbergs Blad =

Local newspaper in Tønsberg, Norway

Tønsbergs Blad

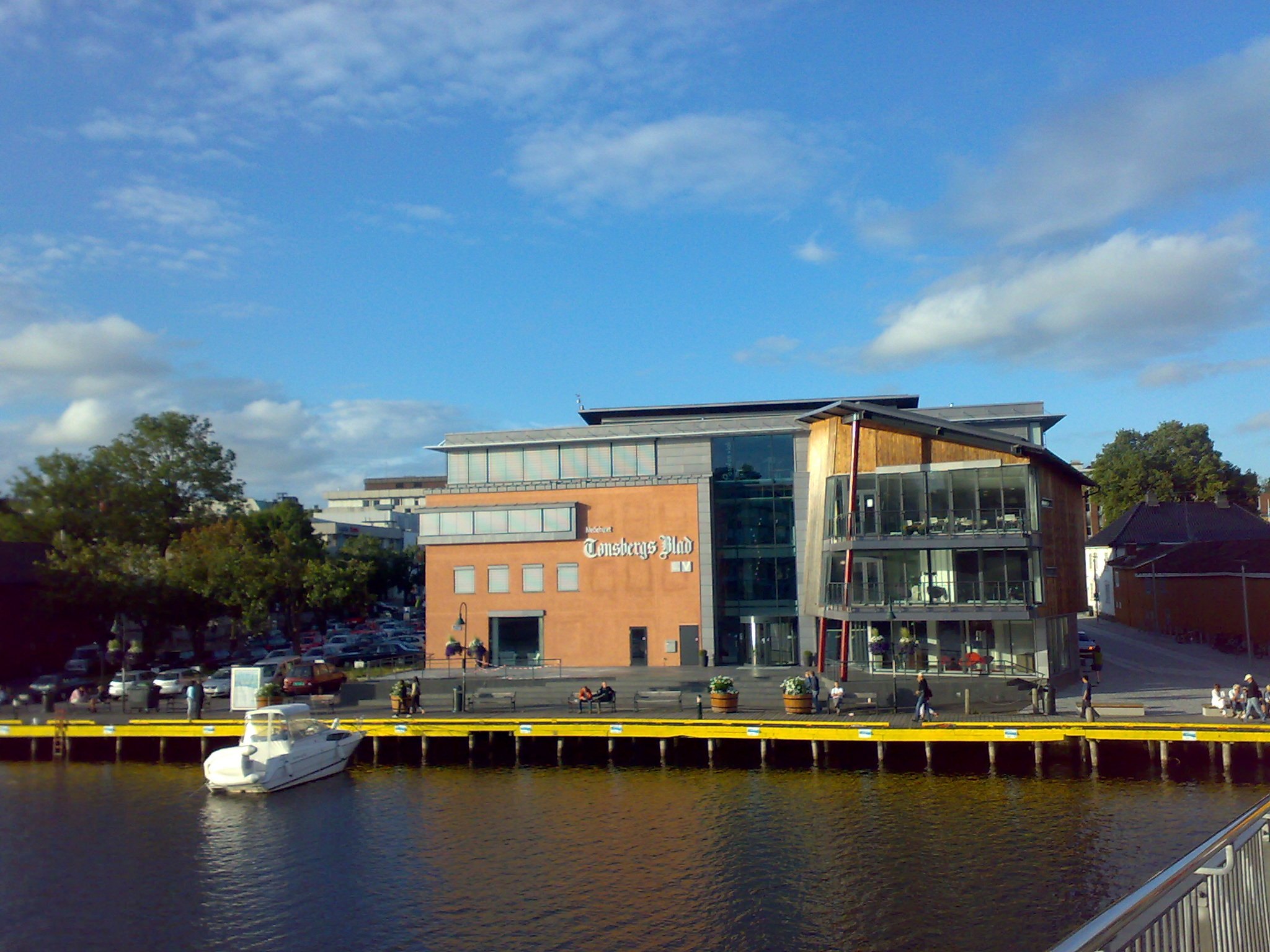
Mediahuset, the headquarters of Tønsbergs Blad.

Tønsbergs Blad is a local newspaper published in Tønsberg, Norway. The newspaper was founded by printer Hans Jørgen Magnus Hansen on 3 August 1870, with an initial circulation of 210 copies. By the turn of the century the circulation had grown to 2,600. In 1881 the newspaper was purchased by Tønsbergs Aktietrykkeri, to operate as a conservative publication. In 1986 Orkla Media AS – part of the Orkla Group – took over ownership. When this company was taken over by the Mecom Group in 2006, it changed name to Edda Media.

Tønsbergs Blad had a circulation of 30,354 copies in 2007. The newspaper employs 98 people full-time, and the editor in chief is Håkon Borud.
