= Østlandets Blad =

Regional newspaper published in Ski, Norway

- Type: Daily newspaper
- Format: Tabloid
- Owner: Amedia AS
- Editor: Alexander Gjermundshaug
- Founded: 1908
- Political alignment: Conservative; Non-partisan
- Headquarters: Ski, Norway
- Circulation: 15,343
- Website: www.oblad.no

Østlandets Blad is a regional newspaper published in Ski, Norway.

It was established in 1908 under the name Øieren, named after a local lake. It was based in Kråkstad at that time. The name Østlandets Blad was taken in 1919. The political stance was Conservative.

After 1945 it gradually increased from three to five editions a week. As of 2007, the paper has a circulation of 15,343, of whom 15,206 are subscribers. It is owned by Østlandets Blad AS, which is owned 100% by Edda Media.
