= Søborg (Gladsaxe municipality) =

Suburb of Copenhagen, Denmark

Coordinates: 55.7370°N 12.5087°E

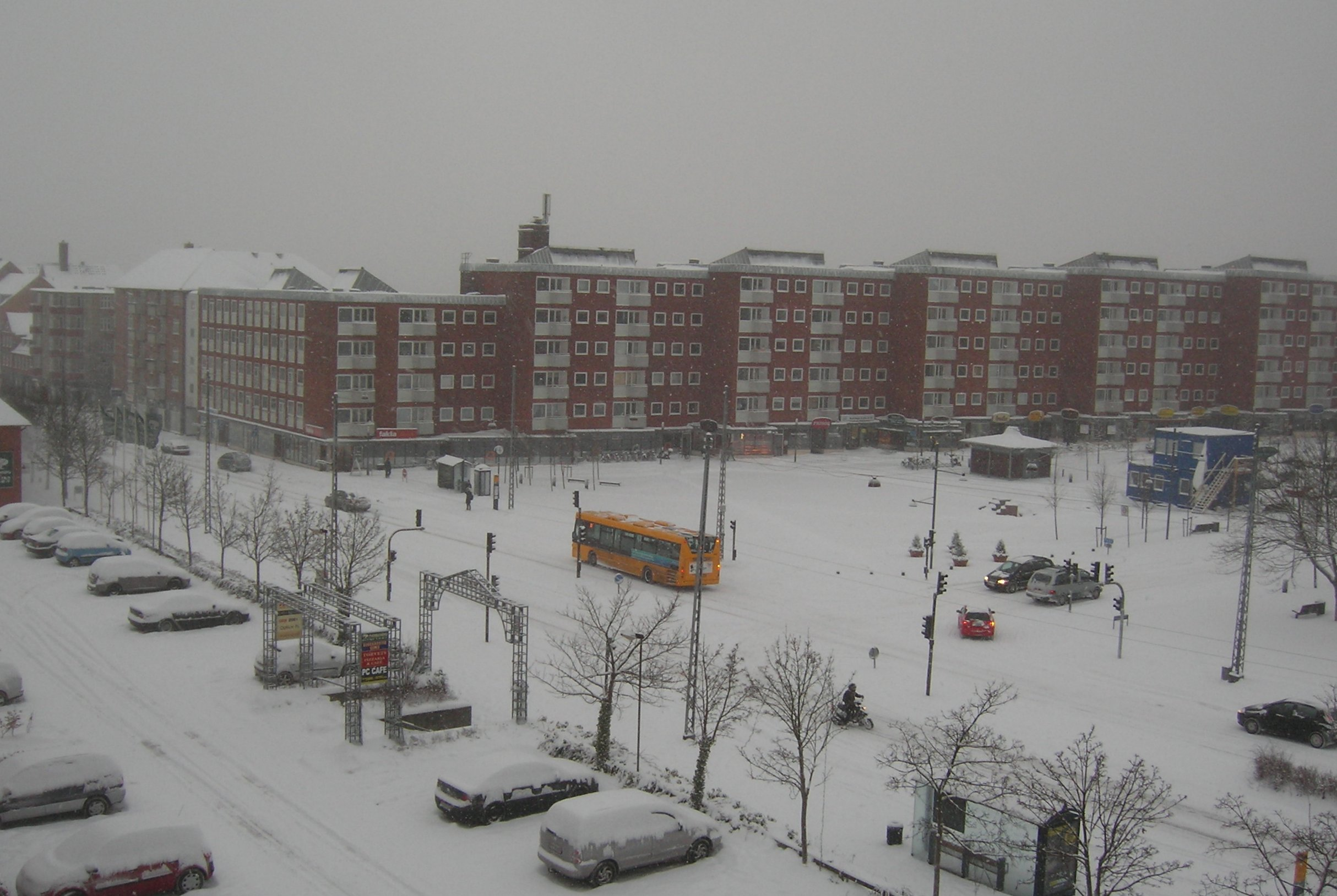
Søborg during wintertime

Søborg is a neighbourhood in Gladsaxe Municipality, located some 10 km northwest of central Copenhagen, Denmark.

== Etymology ==
The name Søborg literally means "Lake-castle" and derives from a building named Søborghus (Lake-castle-house), which was originally located at the east end of Utterslev lake, now known as Utterslev Mose.

== Notable people ==
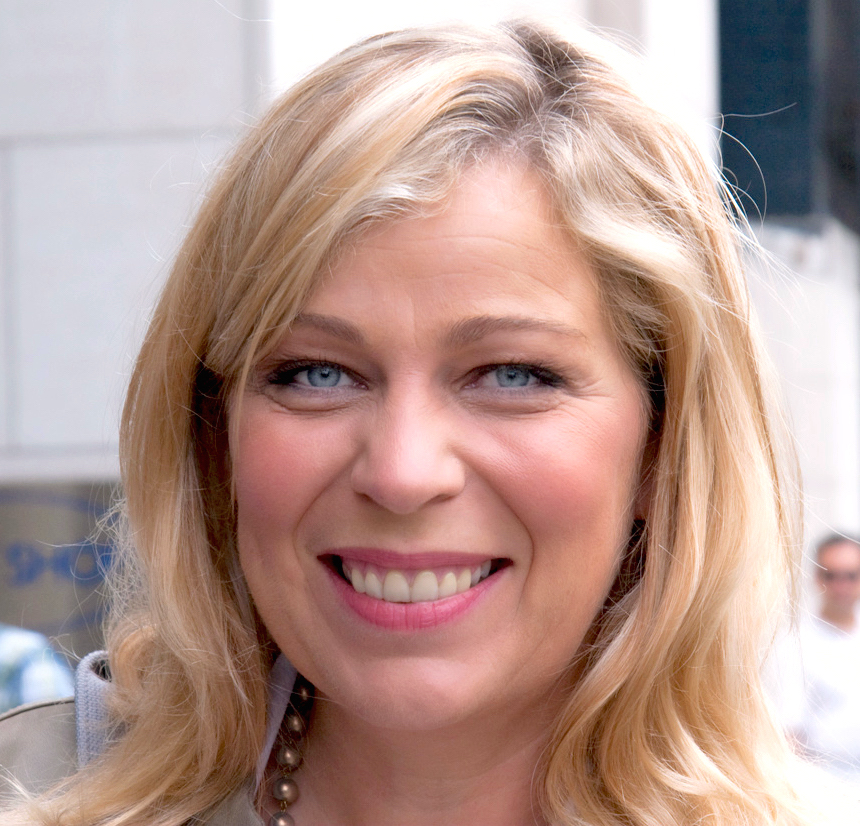
Lone Scherfig, 2009

- Ib Nørholm (1931 in Søborg – 2019) a Danish composer and organist
- Ivar Frounberg (born 1950 in Søborg) a Danish composer, organist, and academic
- Astrid Saalbach (born 1955 in Søborg) a Danish playwright and novelist
- Lone Scherfig (born 1959 in Søborg) a Danish film director and screenwriter
- Lars Bom (born 1961 in Søborg) a Danish actor in theatre, film and TV
- Puk Scharbau (born 1969 in Søborg) a Danish actress
- Iben Hjejle (born 1971 in Søborg) a Danish actress
- Jon Lange (born 1980 in Søborg) a Danish actor
- Kristoffer Eriksen (born 1986 in Søborg) a Danish journalist, editor and TV-host
- Tobias Sorensen (born 1987) a Danish male model, grew up in Søborg

=== Sport ===
- Josephine Asperup (born 1992 in Søborg) an ice hockey player
- Matthias Asperup (born 1995 in Søborg) an ice hockey player
- Tom Belsø (1942 in Søborg – 2020) the first Danish Formula One driver
- Niklas Landin Jacobsen (born 1988 in Søborg) a handball player
- Magnus Landin Jacobsen (born 1995 in Søborg) a handball player, and younger brother of Niklas Landin Jacobsen

== See also ==
- Søborg, Gribskov Municipality
