= Midtjyllands Avis =

Danish local daily newspaper

- Type: Local newspaper
- Format: Tabloid
- Owner: Silkeborg Avis Holding
- Founder: Mediehuset Herning Folkeblad
- Publisher: Midtjyllands Avis A/S
- Founded: 6 May 1857; 168 years ago
- Political alignment: Right-wing
- Language: Danish
- Headquarters: Silkeborg
- Country: Denmark
- Sister newspapers: Herning Folkeblad
- Website: Midtjyllands Avis

Midtjyllands Avis (also known as MJA) is a local newspaper based in Silkeborg, Denmark. It is one of the oldest newspapers in the country, being established in 1857.

== History and profile ==
MJA was first published in 1857, and its first issue appeared on 6 May that year. The owner of the paper was a family company until 1998. MJA is owned by Silkeborg Avis Holding, part of JP/Politikens Hus and has its headquarters in Silkeborg.

MJA is published daily except Sundays by Midtjyllands Avis A/S, a subsidiary of Mediehuset Herning Folkeblad A/S. Mediehuset Herning Folkeblad also publishes Herning Folkeblad and Ikast Avis. MJA was published in broadsheet format until 14 April 2011 when it switched to tabloid format. The paper has a right-wing stance.

The circulation of MJA was 18,000 copies in the first half of 2000, making it one of the twenty best selling newspapers in Denmark.
