= Nordjyske =

- Type: Daily newspaper
- Format: Tabloid
- Publisher: Det Nordjyske Mediehus
- Editor-in-chief: Kevin Walsh
- Editor: Karen Edelmann Keinicke
- Associate editor: Dorthe Andersen
- Founded: 1767; 259 years ago
- Language: Danish
- Headquarters: Aalborg
- Website: Nordjyske

Nordjyske is a daily regional newspaper published in the North Jutland Region of Denmark. It is Denmark's second-oldest newspaper.

== History and profile ==
The newspaper was founded in 1767 as Nyttige og fornøyelige Jydske Efterretninger. In 1827, it merged with Aalborg's second newspaper Aalborgs Stifts Adresse-Avis. The paper was known as Aalborg Stiftstidende until 1999, when it was rebranded to Nordjyske Stiftstidende to create a broader geographical appeal. In 2017 the name was shortened to just Nordjyske.

The publisher of Nordjyske is the Det Nordjyske Mediehus. The paper is published in broadsheet format. It has no political affiliation and has a liberal stance. The paper was also described as having a right-wing tradition in a 2006 study.

Nordjyske Stiftstidende has its headquarters in Aalborg. The paper now serves the whole of Vendsyssel and most of Himmerland and has local editions in Aalborg, Hjørring, Hobro, Frederikshavn, Fjerritslev, Skagen and Brønderslev.

== Circulation ==
Nordjyske had a circulation of 82,000 copies on weekdays and 98,000 copies on Sundays in the first quarter of 2000, making it one of the top 20 newspapers in the country. The circulation of the paper was 83,000 copies in 2002. In 2003 the paper had a circulation of 82,000 copies on weekdays and 94,000 copies on Sundays. Its circulation was 74,000 copies in 2004. The 2005 circulation of the paper was 69,000 copies on weekdays and 80,000 copies on Sundays. Its circulation was 62,075 copies in 2006.

In 2007 the circulation of Nordjyske was 64,186 copies. It sold 41,723 copies in 2013.
