= Liberalism and radicalism in Denmark =

This article gives an overview of liberalism and radicalism in Denmark. It is limited to liberal and radical egalitarian parties with substantial support, mainly proved by having had a representation in the parliament. The sign ⇒ denotes another party in that scheme. For inclusion in this scheme it isn't necessary so that parties labeled themselves as a liberal party.

== Background ==
In Denmark liberalism became a dominant force in 1840, but developed into a conservative direction. After 1870 a second liberal current, based on farmers, arose. This current got finally divided in a social liberal party, Danish Social Liberal Party (Det Radikale Venstre, member LI, ELDR), and a conservative liberal party, Liberal Party (Venstre Danmarks liberale parti, member LI, ELDR). The origin of the word Venstre in both party names is to be found in the fact that the major Conservative party in the 19th century was called Right, and Venstre (Left) was formed as an opposition party. Thus it refers to an old left/right division of the political scale, in modern terms Venstre is usually considered a right wing party and Det Radikale Venstre as a centre party.

== History ==
Below is a timeline listing the name changing and history of the political parties centred on the idea of liberalism in Denmark. Confusingly the term 'left' is used in the name of some liberal parties in Denmark for historic reasons. It does by no means mean 'left' as in modern 'left wing' or socialist, but merely that they were on the contemporary left-wing at the time of their naming:

=== National Liberal Party ===
- 1840: The National Liberal Party (Nationalliberale Parti)) is formed
- 1884: The National Liberal Party merged into the conservative Right (Høyre)

=== From The United Left to Liberal Party (Venstre) ===
- 1870: Liberal farmers formed the liberal party The United Left (Det Forenede Venstre)
- 1892: The United Left fell apart in the Left Reform Party (Venstrereformpartiet) and the ⇒ Moderate Left
- 1905: A radical faction of the party seceded as present-day ⇒ Danish Social Liberal Party
- 1910: The VRP and the ⇒ Moderate Left merged into Liberal Party (Venstre, now usually not translated into English)
- 1934: A right-wing faction seceded as the conservative Free People's Party (Det Frie Folkeparti)
- 1965: A left-wing faction formed the ⇒ Liberal Center

=== Moderate Left ===
- 1892: A right wing faction of the ⇒ United Left formed the Moderate Left (Det Moderate Venstre)
- 1910: The Moderate Left merged into the new ⇒ Liberal Party

=== Danish Social Liberal Party (Radikale Venstre) ===
- 1905: A radical faction of the ⇒ Left Reform Party seceded as the present-day Danish Social Liberal Party (Det Radikale Venstre, literally Radical Left)
- 2007: An MP and an MEP defected from the party in May 2007 and formed the Social Liberal/Social Conservative Ny Alliance.

=== Liberal Center ===
- 1965: A left-wing faction of the ⇒ Left formed the Liberal Center (Liberalt Centrum)
- 1968: LC disappeared

=== Liberal Alliance ===
- 2007: Ny Alliance formed after defections from Radikale Venstre
- 2008: Ny Alliance changed to a more economically liberal platform. With this change the party changed its name to Liberal Alliance.
- 2009: Former Social Liberal Party MP Simon Emil Ammitzbøl founded Borgerligt Centrum, a centre-right party. A few months later, Ammitzbøl and leading members of Borgerligt Centrum left the party to join Liberal Alliance.
- 2024: Liberal Alliance wins first seat in the European Parliament

== Liberal leaders ==
- Danish Social Liberal Party: Carl Theodor Zahle - Hilmar Baunsgaard - Niels Helveg Petersen - Marianne Jelved - Margrethe Vestager
- Liberal Alliance: Anders Samuelsen
- Liberal Party: Poul Hartling - Uffe Ellemann-Jensen - Anders Fogh Rasmussen - Lars Løkke Rasmussen
- Moderates: Lars Løkke Rasmussen

== List of liberal organizations ==
- Venstre The Danish Liberal party.
- Det Radikale Venstre The Danish Social Liberal party.
- Liberal Alliance
- Venstres Ungdom Youth wing of Venstre
- Radikal Ungdom Youth wing of Det Radikale Venstre
- Liberal Alliances Ungdom: Youth wing of Liberal Alliance
- Liberal Students of Denmark DLS - Danmarks Liberale Studerende
- CEPOS An independent classical-liberal/free-market conservative think tank
- The Copenhagen Institute A libertarian/free-market oriented think Tank.
- Support Initiative for Liberty and Democracy in the Baltic Area
- Liberalisterne The Liberals

== See also ==
- History of Denmark
- Politics of Denmark
- List of political parties in Denmark
- Cultural radicalism
