= Mecom Group =

Former British newspaper publishing company

Mecom Group plc
- Company type: Public (LSE: MEC)
- Industry: Publishing
- Founded: 2005
- Defunct: 2014
- Headquarters: London, United Kingdom
- Key people: Stephen Davidson (Executive chairman)
- Revenue: €492 million (2012)(six months to June 2012)
- Operating income: €43.1 million (Loss) (2012) (six months to June 2012)
- Website: mecom.com at the Wayback Machine (archived 2013-03-07)

Mecom Group plc was a newspaper publishing company headquartered in London, United Kingdom.

Initially, it was listed on the London Stock Exchange and was a constituent of the FTSE 250 Index until 22 December 2008, when it became one of three media companies to fall out of the index.

== History ==
The company was founded in 2005 by David Montgomery, a former CEO of the Mirror Group and former editor of The Sun, Daily Mirror, News of the World and Today. Mecom was first listed on the Alternative Investment Market in 2005. In 2008, Mecom was admitted to the main list of the London Stock Exchange.

In conjunction with the American media private equity firm Veronis Suhler Stevenson, the company acquired in 2005 Berliner Verlag, publisher of the Berliner Zeitung and the Berliner Kurier. In 2006, Mecom bought Germany's oldest newspaper, the Hamburger Morgenpost, and the Dutch Media Groep Limburg. The same year, Mecom acquired Orkla Media, a Norwegian Group which includes Edda Media, Berlingske Officin and Rzeczpospolita. In 2007, the company bought a controlling stake in the Dutch publishing group Wegener.

After the acquisitions, the Company owned around 300 titles and has had substantial operations in the Netherlands, Denmark, Norway, Germany and Poland. However, in 2009, Mecom sold all their newspapers in Germany to M. DuMont Schauberg and most of their newspapers in Norway. In 2010, half the revenue and three-quarters of the profit came from the Dutch Wegener group.

In September 2012, following a period of poor trading conditions and continued challenging advertising markets, the group announced a strategic review to examine all options for maximising shareholder value. These options included the disposal of some or all of the Group's businesses. In 2014 Belgian company De Persgroep acquired Mecom and merged it into its own operations.

== Divisions ==
=== Denmark ===
Mecom’s Danish operation was Berlingske Media, engaged in newspaper publishing and printing. Berlingske was one of the largest publishers of nationwide and local daily newspapers and free door-to-door newspapers in Denmark, with a 54% share of the regional distribution market and 33% of the total Danish newspaper segment.

=== Netherlands ===
Mecom Group’s Dutch division included the Wegener and LMG. Wegener was the biggest publisher of local daily newspapers and free door-to-door newspapers in the Netherlands. LMG was the leading regional newspaper company in the Dutch region of Limburg. In March 2012, Mecom reached an agreement to acquire 13.3% interest in Wegener resulting in Mecom holding 99.7% of the ordinary share capital of the company.

=== Norway ===
Mecom owned Norwegian newspapers Romsdals Budstikke and Sunnmorsposten until February 2009 when these were sold to Polaris Media. In late 2011, Mecom held talks with Norwegian media group A-pressen to sell Edda Media, and in June 2012 the sale was finalized with effective proceeds of NOK1,500 million resulting in a net debt reduction of approximately €195million.

=== Poland ===
In October 2011 Mecom disposed of its 51 per cent interest in Presspublica. The Group's activities in Poland continued through Media Regionalne. Located in Warsaw, Media Regionalne held several newspapers, freesheets, websites and printing factories across Poland. Previously known as Orkla Press Polska, the company owned 10 local newspapers with over 300,000 copies sold.
