= JP/Politikens Hus =

Danish media company

- Predecessors: Politikens Hus; Jyllands-Posten A/S
- Founded: January 1, 2003; 23 years ago in Denmark
- Headquarters: Viby J
- Website: jppol.dk

JP/Politikens Hus A/S (transl. House of JP/Politiken) is a Danish media company.

== History and profile ==
JP/Politikens Hus was established on 1 January 2003 as a merger between Politikens Hus and Jyllands-Posten A/S, publishing companies of the major broadsheet newspapers Politiken and Jyllands-Posten, respectively. The company also own Politiken's tabloid Ekstra Bladet, Watch Medier and Finans. A free daily, 24timer, was added in 2006 (closed/merged in 2013).

In addition to publishing these newspapers, JP/Politikens Hus' businesses also include book publishing, printing, local newspapers in Denmark and Sweden, as well as a number of multi-media concerns.

The merger between the publishing companies was administrative, and editorial independence was retained.

== See also ==
- European Press Prize
