= Berlingske Media =

Danish media company

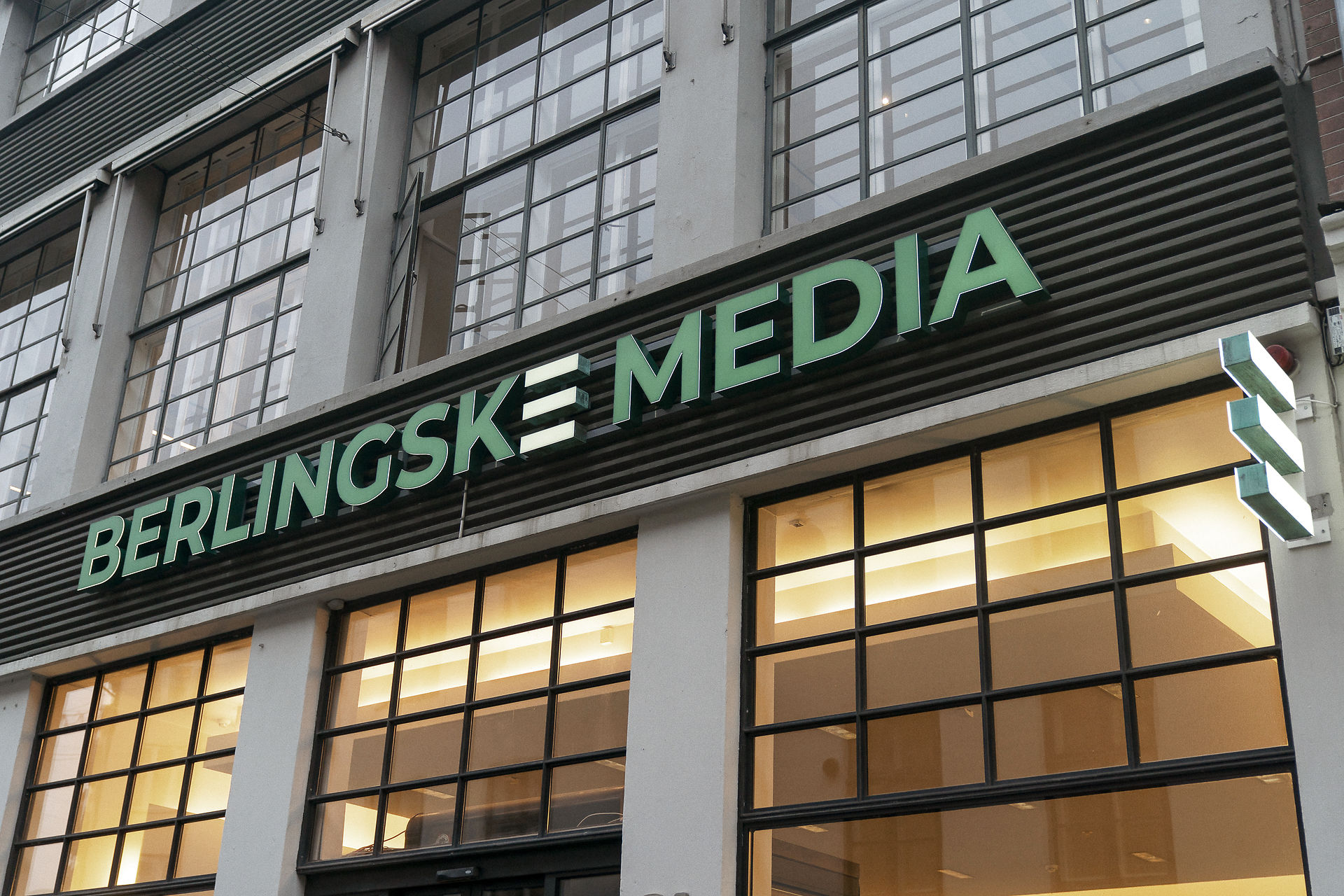
- Berlingske Media
- Type: Private limited company
- Industry: Media
- Founded: 1749
- Founder: Ernst Henrich Berling
- Headquarters: Copenhagen, Denmark
- Key people: Anders Krab-Johansen (CEO); Connie Hedegaard (Chairman)
- Parent: Orkla Group (2000–2006); Mecom Group (2006–2014); DPG Media (2014–2025); Amedia (2025–present)
- Website: www.berlingskemedia.dk

Berlingske Media (formerly Det Berlingske Officin A/S) is a Danish Copenhagen-based media company that owns many newspapers, websites and radio stations. The main newspaper in the company, Berlingske Tidende, now Berlingske, is one of the world's oldest newspapers, having published its first issue on 3 January 1749. The company is run by Anders Krab-Johansen, former CEO and editor in chief at the daily Børsen.

== History ==
The company was founded in 1749 when Ernst Henrich Berling first published Kjøbenhavnske Danske Post-Tidender (later Berlingske Tidende). The company was owned by the Berling family until 1982 when it experienced economical difficulties and was saved by an investment from Mærsk Mc-Kinney Møller. He sold his shares in the company in 1999. From 2000 to 2006, the company was owned by the Orkla Group, a Norwegian conglomerate which purchased 76% of Det Berlingske Officin publishing group' stock for €209 million.

In 2006, Orkla sold its multi-national publishing and media activities, including Det Berlingske Officin, to the British company Mecom Group for €900 million. The company name was changed to "Berlingske Media" to reflect its focus on websites.

In June 2014, Mecom sold Berlingske Media to the Belgian mediahouse De Persgroep, later DPG Media. After DPG Media's takeover, Berlingske Media is focusing on the four main brands; Berlingske, B.T., Weekendavisen and Radio24syv.

In February 2025, Berlingske was sold to the Norwegian media group Amedia.

== Ownerships ==
=== Brands ===
- Berlingske formerly Berlingske Tidende
- B.T.
- B.T.metro (70% and Tamedia 30%)
- Weekendavisen
- Radio24syv (70% and People Group 30%)
