= Cavling Prize =

Danish journalist award

The Cavling Prize (Danish: Cavlingprisen) is a Danish journalist award. It is awarded annually in January to "a journalist or a group of journalists who have shown initiative and talent in the past year."

The Prize commemorates Henrik Cavling, founder of the Danish Journalists Confederation.

The prize consists of 20,000 kroner and a statuette made by George Rode depicting Henry Cavling. The prize is awarded by a committee appointed by the Danish Union of Journalists' executive committee. The prize fund is sponsored in part by the Danish Union of Journalists, and in part by the two newspapers Politiken and Berlingske.

== History ==
The prize was founded on 18 December 1944. The prize fund was created by Danish Union of Journalists, Politiken and Berlingske Tidende.

== Recipients ==
Year	Name(s)	Publication
1945	Henrik V. Ringsted	Politiken
1946	Ole Vinding	
1947	Gunnar R. Næsselund	
1948	Nele Topsøe (Nele Poul Sørensen)	
1949	Poul Dalgaard / Anders B. Nørgaard	Social-Demokraten
1950	Mogens Bostrup	Nationaltidende
1951	Niels Blædel	
1952	Aage Hastrup	
1953	Per Arboe Rasmussen	
1954	Robert Kjældgård	Social-Demokraten
1955	not given	
1956	Røde Kors Ungarn-indsamlingen (eng: Red Cross Hungary-fund raiser)	
1957	Ole Hansen	
1958	not given	
1959	Dan Larsen	
1960	Viggo Duvå	Social-Demokraten
1961	Willy Reunert	Danmarks Radio
1962	Jørgen Hartmann-Petersen	Politiken
1963	Poul Trier Pedersen	Danmarks Radio
1964	Knud Poulsen	-
1965	Poul Dalgaard	Ekstra Bladet
1966	Herbert Pundik	Politiken
1967	Hans V. Bischoff	-
1968	Erik Nørgaard	Politiken
1969	Thyra Christensen	-
1970	Leif Blædel	-
1971	Torgny Møller	Dagbladet Information
1972	Leif Kjeldsen	Politiken
1973	The chief editors of Vejle Avis	Vejle Avis
1974	Anne Wolden-Ræthinge	Politiken
1975	Nele Rue	Danmarks Radio
1976	Harry Rasmussen	Næstved Tidende
1977	Jacob Andersen / Søren Jacobsen	Ekstra Bladet
1978	Svend Bedsted / Jens Otto Kjær Hansen	Jyllands-Posten
1979	Jørgen Flindt Pedersen / Erik Stephensen	Danmarks Radio
1980	Hanne Dam	Dagbladet Information
1981	Henning Thøgersen / Jan Michaelsen	Ekstra Bladet
1982	J. B. Holmgård	Politiken
1983	Hanne Reintoft	Danmarks Radio
1984	Sten Bådsgård / Jørgen Pedersen	Danmarks Radio
1985	Allan Graubæk / Gunner Nielsen / Henrik Thomsen	Holbæk Amts Venstreblad
1986	Alex Frank Larsen	Dagbladet Information
1987	-	The magazine Press
1988	Jens J. Espersen	Ritzau
1989	Anders Peter Mathiasen / Jeppe Juhl	Ekstra Bladet
1990	Erik Eisenberg / Ulrik Haagerup / Martin Uhlenfeldt	Jyllands-Posten
1991	Leif O. Dahl / Claus G. Theilgaard	Vendsyssel Tidende
1992	Nils Ufer (posthumous)	Weekendavisen
1993	Mikkel Hertz	Jyllands-Posten
1994	John Mynderup	Dagbladet Børsen
1995	Christian Nordkap / Lars Rugaard / Erik Valeur	Danmarks Radio
1996	Henrik Grunnet / Michael Klint	TV2 Nordisk Film Broadcast
1997	Poul Brink	Danmarks Radio
1998	Tonni Vinkel Sørensen	Bagsværd/Søborg Bladet
1999	Søren Funch / Jens Chr. Hansen / Erik Eisenberg	Jyllands-Posten
2000	Kim Dahl Nielsen / Kasper D. Borch	Jydske Vestkysten
2001	Poul Høi	Berlingske
2002	Morten Pihl / Jakob Priess-Sørensen	B.T.
2003	Charlotte Aagaard / Jørgen Steen Nielsen / Bo Elkjær	Dagbladet Information and Ekstra Bladet
2004	Miki Mistrati / Thomas Stokholm / Jeppe Facius / Anders-Peter Mathiasen	Bastard Film and Ekstra Bladet
2005	Christian Andersen / Michael Klint	Danmarks Radio
2006	Miriam Dalsgaard / Olav Hergel	Politiken
2007	Peter Øvig Knudsen	-
2008	Morten Crone / Morten Frich / Erik Refner / Jesper Woldenhof	Berlingske
2009	Jesper Tynell	Danmarks Radio
2010	Lars Nørgaard Pedersen / Asger Westh / Stine Larsen	Jyllands-Posten
2011	Ulrik Dahlin / Anton Geist	Dagbladet Information
2012	Asbjørn With	Nordjyske Medier
2013	Jeppe Gaardboe, Frederik Brun Madsen, Søren Kristensen, Michael Klint og Steen Jensen	Danmarks Radio
2014	Morten Pihl	Jyllands-Posten
2015	Puk Damsgård	Danmarks Radio
2016	Chris Kjær Jessen, Michael Lund / Lars Nørgaard Pedersen	Berlingske
2017	Camilla Stockmann / Janus Køster-Rasmussen	Politiken and DR
2018	Eva Jung / Simon Bendtsen / Michael Lund	Berlingske
2019	Tea Krogh Sørensen / Morten Pihl	Jyllands-Posten
2020	Anders Legarth Schmidt	Politiken
2021	Nagieb Khaja, Jeppe Findalen, Thomas Foght and Magnus Mio	Ekstra Bladet
2022	Frederik Hugo Ledegaard Thim	DR Dokumentar
2023	Astrid Fischer, Laura Marie Sørensen, Jonas Deiborg	DR
2024	Theis Ehler Molin, Helle Fuusager, Mathias Mencke, Kaare Sørensen	Zetland
2025	Lasse Skou Andersen, Sebastian Gjerding, Emilie Ekeberg, Nikolaj Houmann Mortensen, Charlotte Aagaard.	Danwatch / Information
