= Hørup =

Horup, Hörup, Hørup or Hurup may refer to

== Places ==
- Hörup, a municipality in Schleswig-Holstein, Germany
- Hürup, a municipality in Schleswig-Holstein, Germany
  - Hürup (Amt)
- Hurup Thy, a town in Denmark

== People with the surname ==
- Ellen Hørup, Danish journalist and writer
- Emma Hørup, Danish journalist and schoolteacher
- Viggo Hørup, Danish politician
