= Tamil Case =

The Tamil Case (Danish: Tamilsagen) was a case about family reunification in Denmark of Tamil refugees from the Sri Lankan Civil War. The affair led to the resignation of the government led by Poul Schlüter in 1993.

The scandal was first uncovered in a series of articles written by Nils Ufer in Weekendavisen. Ufer later dramatized it in the play Mens vi venter på retfærdigheden. (While We're Waiting for Justice). He received the Cavling Prize for his work on it posthumously in 1992.

== Background ==
The case began in 1987, when the government examined the possibilities of decreasing the number of Tamil family reunifications. Following this, the Minister of Justice Erik Ninn-Hansen decided to stall the advance of family reunification for Tamil refugees. Danish law clearly granted the Tamil refugees the right to family reunification, thus rendering the justice minister's order illegal.

== Media ==
Nils Ufer uncovered the affair in a series of articles in Weekendavisen. His articles relied on information from confidential interrogations of civil servants. In 2011, former Weekendavisen editor-in-chief Tøger Seidenfaden disclosed that Ufer's secret source was Hans Gammeltoft-Hansen. Ufer received the Cavling Prize posthumously for his coverage of the scandal in 1992. He also wrote a five-hour-long, dramatized monologue Mens vi venter på retfærdigheden ('While we wait for justice') about the affair. It played at Café Teatret in Copenhagen with Peter Larsen in its only role and was also broadcast on DR1 in 1992.

== Consequences ==
When the case appeared in the media, several political parties opposed a re-election of Ninn-Hansen, and others demanded an investigation. This ultimately led to his resignation as minister of justice in 1989.

Four civil servants in the Ministry of Justice were charged, and the minister of justice was impeached, which led to the resignation of the government in 1993. In 1995, Ninn-Hansen was found guilty in three cases of abuse of power and received a suspended sentence of four months' imprisonment.

The case is well known in Denmark due to an infamous speech given by Prime Minister Poul Schlüter, wherein he stated that "nothing has been swept under the rug", which became a common Danish catchphrase. (Der er ikke fejet noget ind under gulvtæppet).
