= Nils Ufer =

Danish journalist

Nils Ufer (17 June 1939 – 2 January 1993) was a Danish journalist and editor. He received the Cavling Prize for his coverage of the Tamil scandal for Weekendavisen in 1992, and also wrote the five-hour single-character play Mens vi venter på retfærdigheden about the affair.

== Early life ==
Ufer was born in Copenhagen, the son of artist Johannes Ufer and secretary Gunhild Ufer, née Sørensen.

== Career ==
Ufer began his career as a journalist at Fyns Tidende in Odense. He worked for Dagbladet Information from 1964 to 1974. In 1968, he covered the Paris student riots for the newspaper.

He left Dagbladet Information to assume a position as editor of the satirical magazine Corsaren in 1984 but returned to the newspaper in 1985.

In 1987, Ufer joined Weekendavisen. He played a central role in the uncovering of the Tamil scandal. He won the Cavling Prize posthumously for his coverage of the scandal in 1992.

== Acting ==
Ufer appeared as an actor in six Danish feature films in the period 1969-1974:

- Den gale dansker (1969)
- Giv Gud en chance om søndagen (1970)
- Dear Irene (1971)
- Revolutionen i vandkanten (1971)
- Mor, jeg har patienter (1972)
- Prins Piwi (1974)

== Personal life ==
Ufer died unexpectedly in 1993. He is buried at Assistens Cemetery in Copenhagen.

== Written works ==
- Den nøgne journalist (1988)
- Det skjulte folk (1991)
