= Anne Knudsen =

- Born: Anne Margrethe Knudsen; 8 June 1948; Hillerød, Denmark
- Died: 1 April 2022 (aged 73)
- Education: University of Copenhagen; Odense University
- Occupations: Anthropologist; Editor; Journalist; Researcher
- Employers: Weekendavisen; Politiken
- Spouse: Otto Jul Pedersen (m. 1971; death 2022)
- Children: 3

Anne Margrethe Knudsen (7 June 1948 – 1 April 2022) was a Danish anthropologist, editor, journalist and researcher. She worked at the University of Copenhagen and Odense University in a number of research positions as an anthropologist from 1982 to 1994. Knudsen was a columnist and reviewer at Weekendavisen and was later the paper's editor-in-chief and CEO. She was also the features editor of the daily newspaper Politiken and presented Danmarks Radio's daily television debate programme Deadline broadcast on DR2.

== Early life and education ==
Knudsen was born in Hillerød on 7 June 1948. Her father was the architect Ejvind WK and Laurentze Simonsen. Knudsen had a younger brother. In 1955, at age six, she and her family moved to Greenland, living in Ammassalik, East Greenland, where her father worked as an assistant construction manager for the Greenland Ministry, supervising the building of houses and roads. Knudsen attended a school with eight or nine Danish children amongst Greenlandic children. The family decided to return to Denmark when she was 13, residing in Frederikssund and attending a private school and then at Frederiksborg State School, graduating as a classical language student in 1967.

Between 1967 and 1973, Knudsen alternately studied French, Spanish and medicine at the University of Copenhagen and classical philology at Odense University, while also travelling all over Europe. She decided to study anthropology after it was recommended to her by a friend, receiving her master's degree with a thesis on Algeria in 1981. In 1989, Knudsen became a Doctor of Philosophy with her doctoral thesis called En ø i historien concerning Corsica.

== Career ==
From 1982 to 1994, she worked at the University of Copenhagen and Odense University in a number of research positions. Working as an anthropologist, Knudsen worked with Europe and European minorities, especially populations that did not permit outside governance. She researched the ways they maintained their rebellious traditions through generations. In this connection, Knudsen conducted fieldwork in Corsica, where she resided for several long periods between 1983 and 1993. In 1994, she became an associate professor of anthropology at Odense University in 1994 but left the same year because she missed the daily contact with her family. Knudsen published a number of works in international professional literature and given guest lectures all over the world. She educated and lectured extensively at the university and college levels.

She was a co-founder and from the start editor of the journal Stofskifte. From 1991 to 1994, Knudsen was a columnist and reviewer at Weekendavisen, encouraged by the editor-in-chief Peter Wivel. In 1996, she published the book, Her går det godt, on how the dominance of women in the public sector had led to a "motherly" patronising culture that pushed boys and men into caricatured masculinity. The book received a mixed response. Between 1994 and 1996, Knudsen was the features editor of the daily newspaper Politiken after being offered the job. She became a writer at Weekendavisen and presented Danmarks Radio's daily television debate programme Deadline broadcast on DR2 until 1998; she left the role because she felt the medium of television was too superficial. Knudsen was chairman of the Copenhagen Parents' Organization from 1976 to 1978, led the Danish Anthropological Association from 1981, chairman of the Peace Foundation from 1990 to 1995 and was a member of the board of the Danish Women's Academics between 1990 and 1999. She authored the pro-European Union book Fanden på væggen (The Devil on the Wall) in 1997, and the cookbook, Rolig nu. I køkkenet med Anne Knudsen, in 2001.

She was appointed editor-in-chief of Weekendavisen in 1998 and remained in the role until 2016; Knudsen was also its CEO between 2002 and 2016. She was a member of the exclusive club of female newspaper editors-in-chief, which until then had only included Bente Hansen, Lisbeth Knudsen and Anne E. Jensen. Knudsen oversaw an increase in the newspaper's circulation and larger profits, and strongly supported the participation of Denmark in the War in Afghanistan since two of her children were in the Royal Life Guards that were deployed of Afghanistan. She was replaced by Martin Krasnik as editor-in-chief and Mette Maix as CEO. In 2018, Knudsen published her memoirs about the time she spent in Greenland, Hvor jeg voksede op, var der isbjørne.

== Personal life ==
She was married to the sociologist Otto Jul Pedersen from 16 October 1971 to her death from a short illness on 1 April 2022. There were three children of the marriage. Knudsen was buried at Stenløse Kirkegård.

== Recognition ==
She received multiple awards for communication and scientific work and was Denmark's candidate for the European Women's Prize in 1995. Knudsen received The Native Danish Language Award in 2008.
