= Anne Wolden-Ræthinge =

Danish journalist and author (1929–2016)

- Born: 11 July 1929; Gråsten, South Jutland, Denmark
- Died: 22 April 2016 (aged 86)
- Other name: Ninka (pseudonym)
- Education: Oklahoma State University–Stillwater
- Occupations: Biographer; Journalist; Writer
- Years active: 1951–2011
- Children: 1
- Awards: Cavling Prize; Knight of the Order of the Dannebrog

Anne Wolden-Ræthinge, known by the pseudonym Ninka, (11 July 1929 – 22 April 2016) was a Danish broadcast and newspaper journalist, biographer and writer who specialised in interviews with high-profile figures. She first worked at the Copenhagen daily conservative newspaper Nationaltidende in 1951 and authored articles about women's issues at Dagens Nyheder from 1954 to 1961 with contributions to Alt for Damerne. Wolden-Ræthinge worked for the Sunday edition of the newspaper Politiken from 1961, covering social issues and then became the publication's leading interviewer for its feature articles. She was a 1974 recipient of the Cavling Prize and was made a Knight of the Order of the Dannebrog in 1991.

== Early life ==
Wolden-Ræthinge was born in Gråsten in South Jutland on 11 July 1929. She was the daughter of the detective Hans Povl Emil Ræthinge and the customs administrator Ellen Margrethe Wolden. Wolden-Ræthinge had two younger siblings and was brought up in Gråsten with a politically active mother and a local journalist. She attended Sønderborg Statsskole, where she gave brief interviews to the local social democratic newspaper Sønderjyden in her final years there. Wolden-Ræthinge graduated from the school in 1946 and joined the staff of Sønderjyden as a trainee journalist the following year. She ventured to the United States and studied journalism at Oklahoma State University–Stillwater under the Marie Illum Grant and the Carlsberg Foundation Travel Grant for two-and-a-half-years.

== Career ==
Following her return to Denmark, Wolden-Ræthinge gained employment at the Copenhagen daily conservative newspaper Nationaltidende in 1951. In 1954, she was employed by Dagens Nyheder after the journalist Didder Rønlund, the newspaper's female pages editor, introduced Wolden-Ræthinge to the publication. Wolden-Ræthinge adopted the pseudonym Ninka after the busy and organised Rabbit (Ninka Ninus) in the children's story series "Winnie-the-Pooh" by A. A. Milne. She had been asked by the newspaper's typographers to adopt a short pseudonym for easier printing in the lead of the time. Wolden-Ræthinge primarily authored articles about women's issues. She did some Danish radio broadcasts with the writer Karl Bjarnhof from 1954 to 1958 and was a contributor to Alt for Damerne.

After Dagens Nyheder closed in September 1961, Wolden-Ræthinge transferred to the daily newspaper Politiken by its Sunday editor Paul Hammerich. Her first years at the publication saw her cover social issues, which she did by conducting multiple interviews with an emphasis on human aspects. Wolden-Ræthinge became the publication's leading interviewer for its feature articles on its Sunday edition, and her first interview was with her former editor-in-chief Jens Søltoft-Jensen. She came into close contact with many personalities from the worlds of architecture, literature, music, politics, theatre, revues and visual arts, and conducted many interviews with them by focusing on "the psychological empathy based on sympathy, prefers more than she provokes or seeks to hand over." Wolden-Ræthinge specialised in the personal interview that aims "to paint a topical, possibly situational, portrait of the interviewee" and focus primarily on the interviewees views, assessments and inner life in lieu of critical analysis or professional aspects from their working life.

She interviewed notable world figures such as Ingmar Bergman, Marlene Dietrich and Olof Palme as well as Danish personalities including Carl Theodor Dreyer, Osvald Helmuth, Jens Otto Krag, Per Kirkeby and Carl-Henning Pedersen. Wolden-Ræthinge portrayed members of the Danish royal family in books and on television. She was the author of books based on her interviews, including udgivet 33 portrætter (1969), Den vanskelige død (1974), Ni Ninka interviews fra Amalienborg til Christiania (1977), Pas på! Dig og trafikken (1978), Nye Ninka interviews (1980), Dialog mellem to generatione (1988), Dronning i Danmark. Margrethe den anden fortæller om sit liv (1989), og En familie og dens dronning (1996), 29 danske politikere. Ninka interviews gennem 40 år (2001), Rejse i livet – kronrins Frederik fortæller til Ninka (2002), Om lidt er vi borte. Modstandsbevægelsens topfolk fortæller til Ninka (2005) and Helle – i samtaler med Ninka (2011).

== Personal life ==
Wolden-Ræthinge had one child, and was not married. She died on 22 April 2016.

== Awards ==
In 1974, Wolden-Ræthinge was awarded the Cavling Prize to honor her "as an interviewer and also for giving readers a new insight into the everyday world in which we live." That same year, she was the recipient of the Kristian Dahl Memorial Scholarship and the Ebbe Muncks Honorary Award in 1992. Wolden-Ræthinge was appointed Knight of the Order of the Dannebrog in 1991.
