= Gimle, Frederiksberg =

Gimle
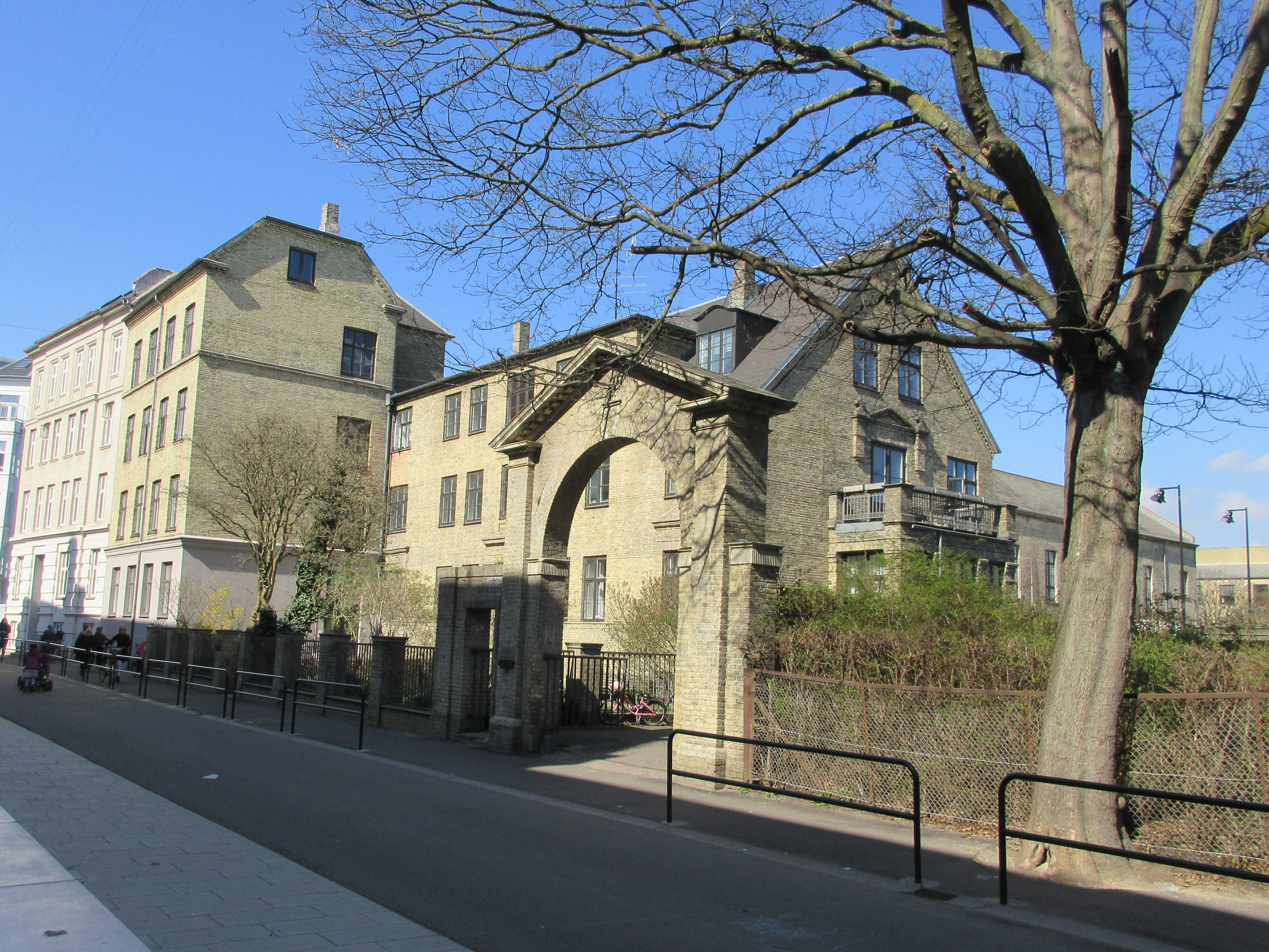
- Interactive map of the Gimle area

General information
- Location: Grundtvigsvej 14, Frederiksberg, Denmark
- Coordinates: 55.6786°N 12.5392°E

Gimle is a former community centre in Frederiksberg, Denmark. The building on Grundtvigsvej 14 is now part of University of Copenhagen's Frederiksberg Campus.

== History ==
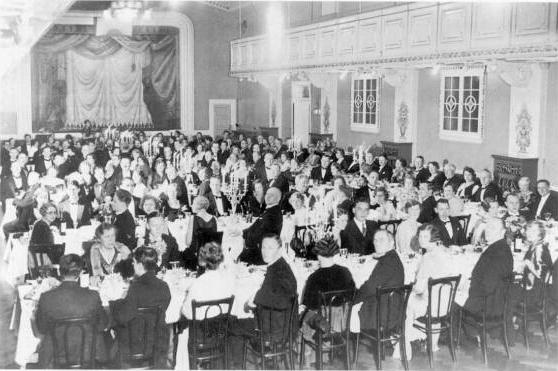
Interior

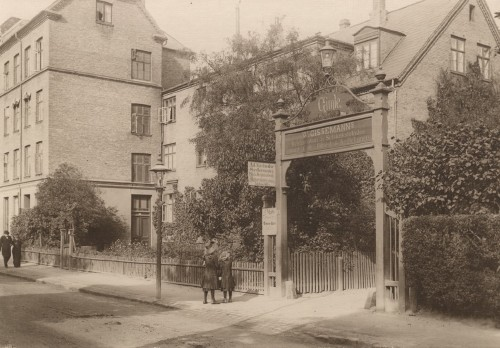
The main entrance in the 1910s

In the beginning of the 19th century the site belonged to a country house known as Christianshvile. In 1847, Christianshvile was sold to Christian P. Bianco Luno, who then sold off the land in lots prior to his death five years later. Two streets were named after him: Bianco Lunos Allé still exists today, whereas Bianco Lunos Sideallé was renamed Grundtvigsvej in 1872.

One of the lots on Bianco Lunos Sideallé was sold to Martin Hansen-Gissemann in 1865. He initially built an apartment building on it. In 1873, he also opened Gimle, a two-storey building used as a sort of privately run community centre. The great hall could accommodate up to 1,400 guests and was used for a wide range of activities, including dancing, amateur theatre, political meetings and social events. The facilities also included a shooting range used by a lower-class clientele than that of the Royal Copenhagen Shooting Society on Vesterbrogade. In 1876, the venue played host to the Danish Social Democratic Party's first congress. The party had been founded by Louis Pio, Harald Brix and Paul Geleff in 1871, but they had been imprisoned and were not released until 1875. The 75 representatives on the congress adopted the so-called "Gimle Programme". The building was also used as a venue by Borgerforeningen, but they later moved their social gatherings to Josty.

The building was purchased by the Royal Danish Agricultural and Veterinary College in 1956. The building was modernized and converted into a canteen for students.

== Storm P murals ==
In 1922, Storm P, together with his friend and colleague Christian Arhof, created a series of murals in the cellar under Gimle. They were restored by experts from the National Museum in 1997. One of the murals is an early representation of the character Peter Vimmelskaft who would later feature and the comic strip Peter and Ping.
