= Danwatch =

Danish investigative journalism outlet

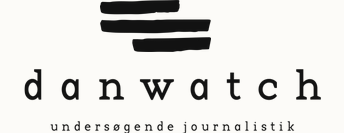
- Format: Web Media
- Owner: Fonden Danwatch
- Editor: Jesper Nymark, Thomas Gösta Svensson
- Founded: 2007; 19 years ago
- Political alignment: Independent
- Language: Danish
- Website: https://danwatch.dk/

Danwatch is a Danish investigative journalism organisation. Their focus areas are climate change and working conditions in developing countries. The organisation was founded in 2007 by various Danish non-government organisations including Forbrugerrådet Tænk, World Wide Fund for Nature, Mellemfolkeligt Samvirke, Folkekirkens Nødhjælp and Solhvervfonden.

In 2026 five journalists from the Danish newspaper Dagbladet Information and Danwatch received the Cavlingprisen for a series of 106 articles on Danish weapons exports to Israel.
