= Morten Pihl =

- Born: 1961 (age 64–65); Svaneke, Denmark
- Occupation: journalist
- Employer: Jyllands-Posten
- Awards: Cavlingprisen (2002, 2014, 2019) the European Press Prize (2013)

Morten Pihl (1961) is a Danish journalist. He has won the Cavling Prize a record holding 3 three times. He has been a part of the investigative journalism-group at the Danish newspaper Jyllands-Posten since 2003. Previously he has worked for Frederiksborg Amtsavis 1986, Berlingske 1987–97, Advokatsamfundet 1998–99, DR Nyheder 1999–2000, Aktuelt 2000–2001, B.T. 2001–03.

In 2013 Pihl won the first edition of the European Press Prize together Orla Borg and Carsten Ellegaard for their story on Danish Security and Intelligence Services involvement in the killing of Anwar al-Awlaki by CIA in 2011.

== Selected works ==
- Pihl, Morten; Priess-Sørensen, Jakob (2002). Brixtofte : historien om en afsløring. Lindhardt og Ringhof. ISBN 87-595-1813-8.
- Pihl, Morten (2009). Højt at flyve : Peter Brixtoftes utrolige rejse fra stjernepolitiker til straffefange. ISBN 978-87-7692-196-5.
