= Lille Kirkestræde 1 =

Historic building in Copenhagen, Denmark

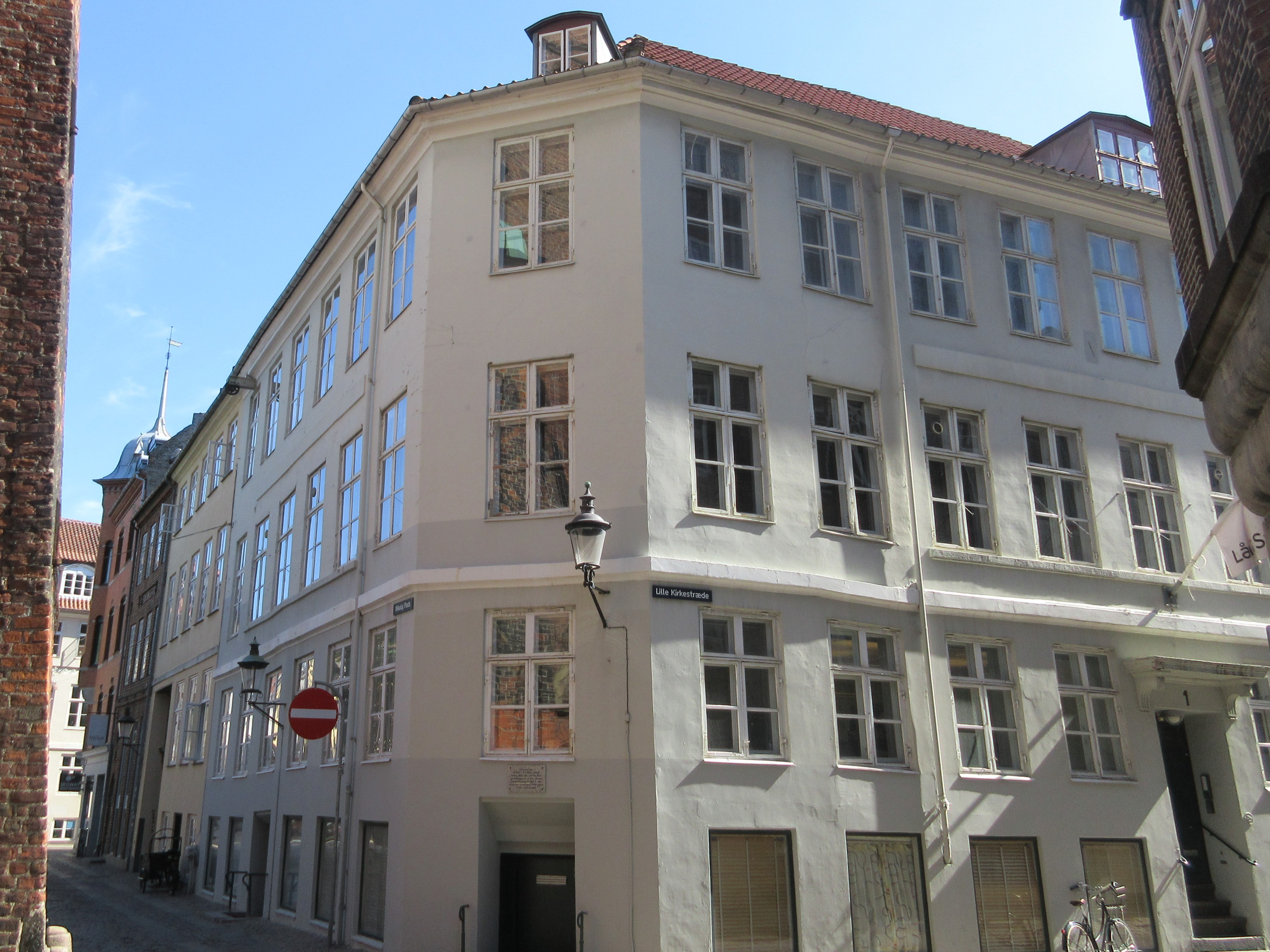
- Interactive map of the Lille Kirkestræde 1 area

General information
- Architectural style: Neoclassical
- Location: Copenhagen, Denmark
- Coordinates: 55°40′41.3″N 12°34′51.53″E
- Completed: 1797

Design and construction
- Architect: Andreas Hallander

Lille Kirkestræde 1/Nikolaj Plads 28 is a Neoclassical corner building situated in front of the former St. Nicolas' Church, now Kunsthallen Nikolaj, in central Copenhagen, Denmark. It was listed in 1945. The building was like most of the buildings in the area constructed following the Copenhagen Fire of 1795. It was listed in the Danish registry of protected buildings and places in 1945.

A plaque on the chamfered corner of the building commemorates that Louis Pio spoke to the crowds in Lille Kirkestræde from a window on the second floor on the night before the so-called Battle of the Common (Slaget på Fælleden) on 5 May 1872.

== History ==
=== 18th century ===
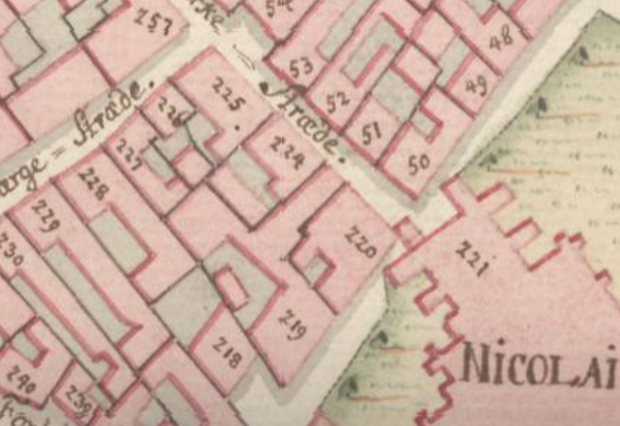
No. 200 and No. 224 seen on a detail from Christian Gedde's map of the East Quarter, 1757.

In the late 17th century, the site was made up of two separate properties. The corner property was listed as No. 188 in the East Quarter (Øster Kvarter) in 1689, owned by Christian Casuben. The other property was listed as No. 189, owned by tailor Ole Pedersen. The old No. 177 was listed as No. 220 in 1756 and owned by joiner Hans David Mein. The old No. 189 was listed as No. 224 in 1756, owned by Ole Bodelsen.

Together with St. Nicolas' Church and most of the other buildings in the area, the two properties were destroyed in the Copenhagen Fire of 1795. The present building on the site was constructed by master builder Andreas Hallander in 1797. The ruined church tower in front of the church was adapted for use as a fire station and watchtower.

=== 19th century ===
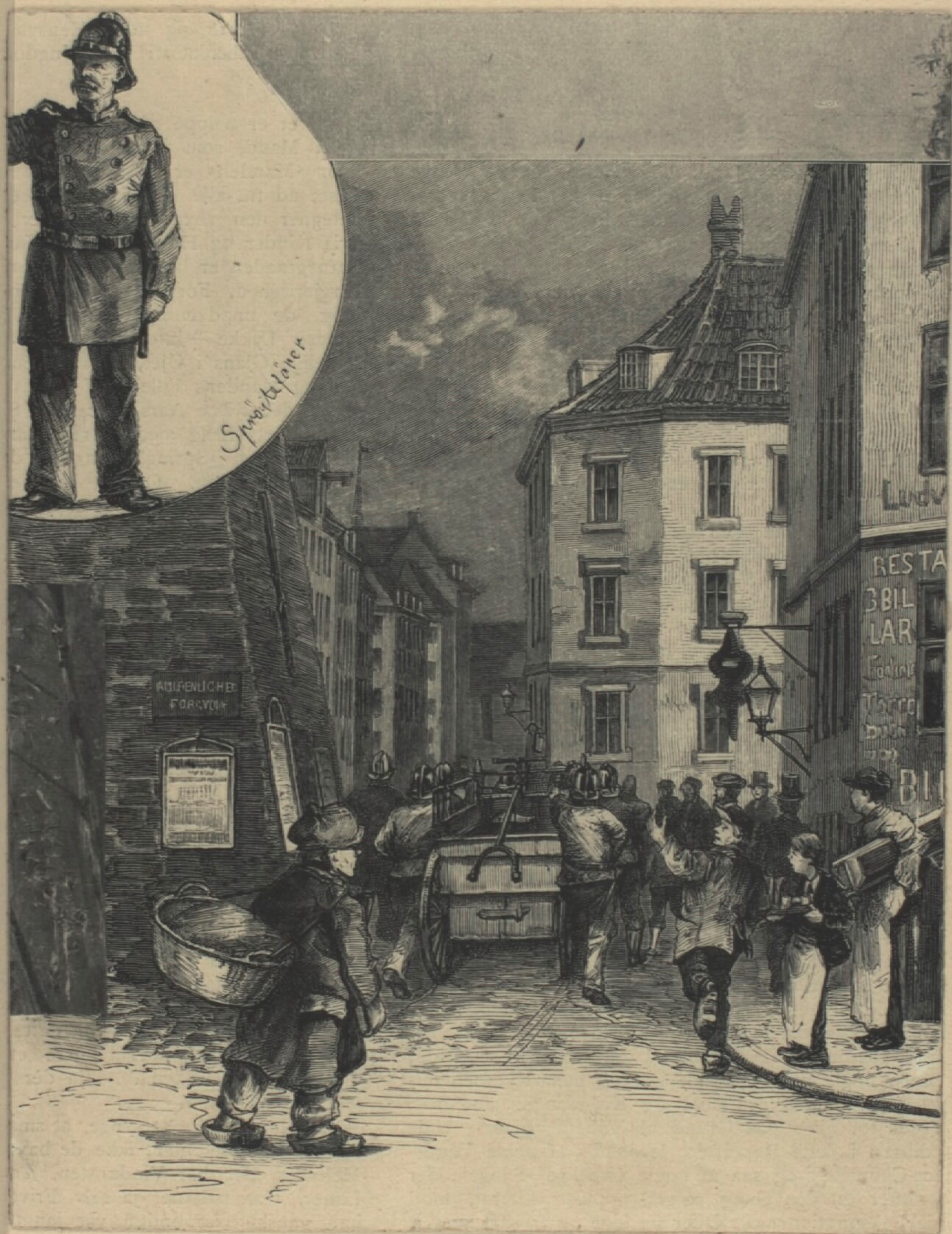
The building seen on an old illustration.

At the time of the 1801 census, the property was home to a total of 19 people. Abraham Bendixen, a manufacturer, resided in the building with his wife Zimire Abraham, his son and business partner Moses Bendixen and a maid. Anne Elisabeth Wilken, a widow barkeeper, resided in the building with her 24-year-old daughter Sophie Marie Wilken and a maid. Peder Seideger, employed by the Swedish envoy, resided in the building with his wife Caroline Hansdatter and their six-year-old daughter Trine Franciska Seideger as well as toll/duty accountant Peder Mehl and clerk Christian Honningdal. Lauritz Møller, a club host, resided in the building with his wife Nicoline Trane, their five-year-old daughter, a housekeeper, two maids and a male caretaker.

The property was listed as No. 101 in the new cadastre of 1806. It was owned by an assessor named Horn at the time.

The property was later owned by engraver/jeweler Herman Anton Eylargi (1769-1837). He also owned Kronprinsensgade No. 36 (now Kronprinsensgade 10). On 14 June 1814, he was married to Mette Sophie Weyvadt (1779-1864).

At the time of the 1840 census, the property was home to a total of 28 people. The now 66-year-old Moses Bendixsen was still residing in the ground floor apartment. He lived there with his wife Hanne Bendixsen, their four daughters (aged 20 to 27) and a maid. Peter Christian Bøysen, a wine merchant, resided in the other ground floor apartment with his two sisters and a maid. Frederik Vallentin Werner, a furniture retailer, resided on the second floor with his wife Fredrike Clara Werner, their three-year-old daughter and a lodger (a customs officer). Werner's furniture shop was located on the first floor. Christian Rauch, a 77-year-old widow, resided on the third floor with her 45-year-old unmarried daughter Inger Marie Rauch. Hans Jensen Trelde, a barkeeper, resided in the basement with his wife Karen Kirstine Madsdatter Trelde, their five children (aged three to 15) and three maids.

By 1850, the ground-floor apartment to the left was occupied by the businessman (grosserer) Heymann Israel Drucker (1819–1887), his one-year-old daughter Pauline Rosalie Drucken, his employee Michael Bendix Jacobsen, a wet nurse and a maid. Duncker's wife Sofie Henriques (1812–1896), a daughter of Ruben Henriques, is not mentioned in the census records. Johan Fredrick Reuch, a musician in the Royal Danish Orchestra, resided in the other ground floor apartment with his wife Ida Elisabeth Rauch née Omoth and a maid. Hans Jensen Trelde, a barkeeperand courier working for Klasselotteriet, resided in the basement with his wife Konen Kirstine Trelde, their four children and two maids.

=== 20th century ===
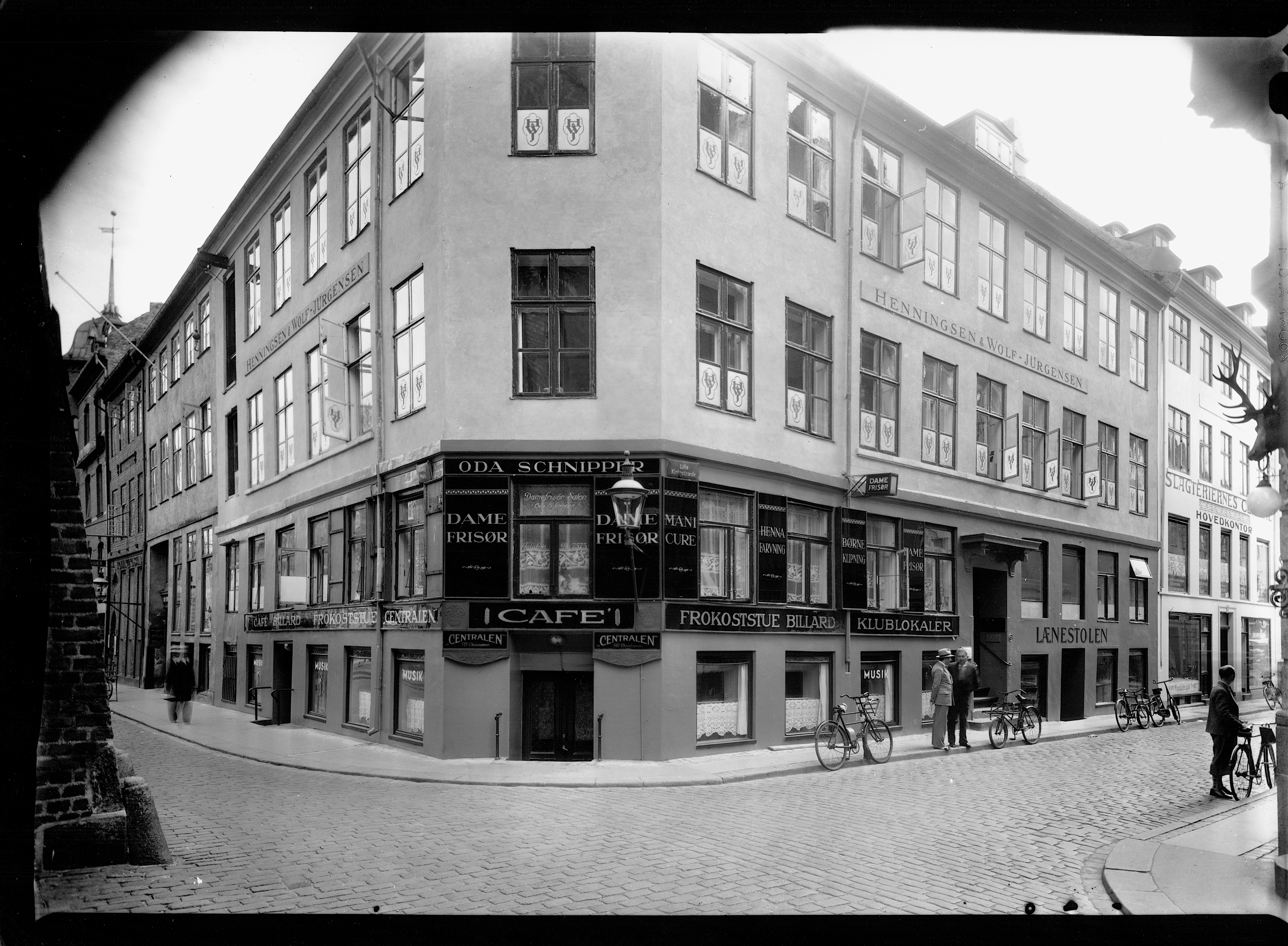
The building in 1935

Lawyer and politician J.K. Lauridsen's (1868–1905) office was located in the building towards Lille Kirkestræde in the 1900s.

Oda Schnipper's hair salon was based out of the ground floor of the building in the 1930s. Ventralen, a lunch restaurant, was located in the basement at the same time.

== Architecture ==
Lille Kirkestræde 1 is constructed with three storeys over a walk-out basement. The building has a nine-bay-long facade on Lille Kirkestræde, a six-bay-long facade towards Nikolaj Plads and a chamfered corner. The chamfered corner bay was dictated for all corner buildings by Jørgen Henrich Rawert's and Peter Meyn's guidelines for the rebuilding of the city after the fire, so that the fire department's long ladder companies could navigate the streets more easily. The white-painted, plastered facade is finished with a belt course above the ground floor and a simple cornice below the roof. The main entrance in the central bay of the Lille Kirkestræde facade is topped by a hood mould. The three basement entrances are located next to the main entrance in Lille Kirkestræde, the fourth bay from the left towards Nikolaj Plads the corner bay. The roof is clad with red tile. It features a total of four dormer windows towards the streets. A short perpendicular wing extends from the rear side of the building. The facades towards the yard are all plastered in an iron vitriol yellow colour.

== Commemorative plaque ==
A commemorative plaque on the corner of the building commemorates that Louis Pio spoke to the crowds in Lille Kirkestræde from a window on the second floor on the night before the so-called Battle of the Common (Slaget på Fælleden) on 5 May 1872.

== Today ==
The property is owned today by Ejerforeningen Lille Kirkestræde 1.

== Gallery ==
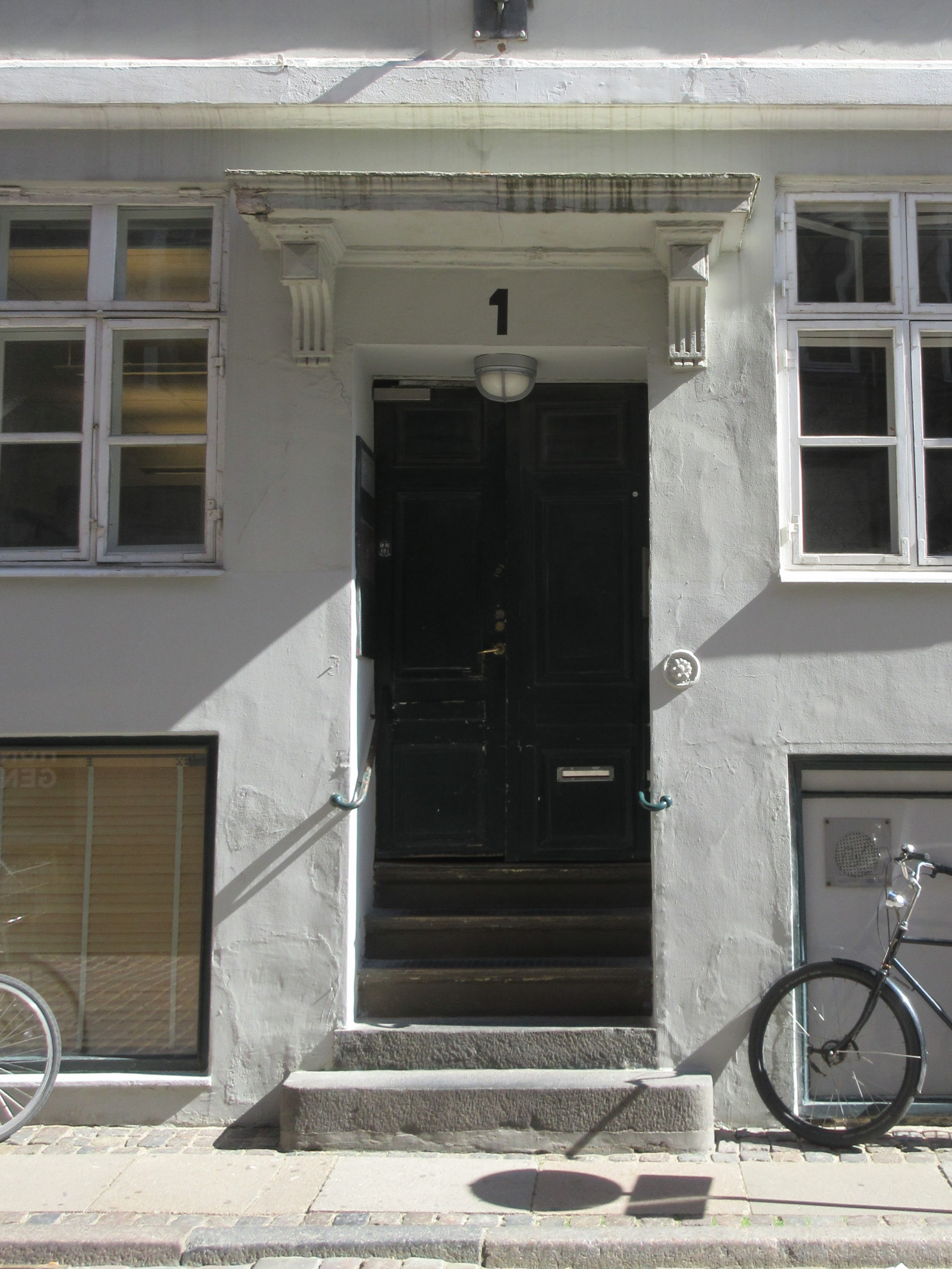
Door

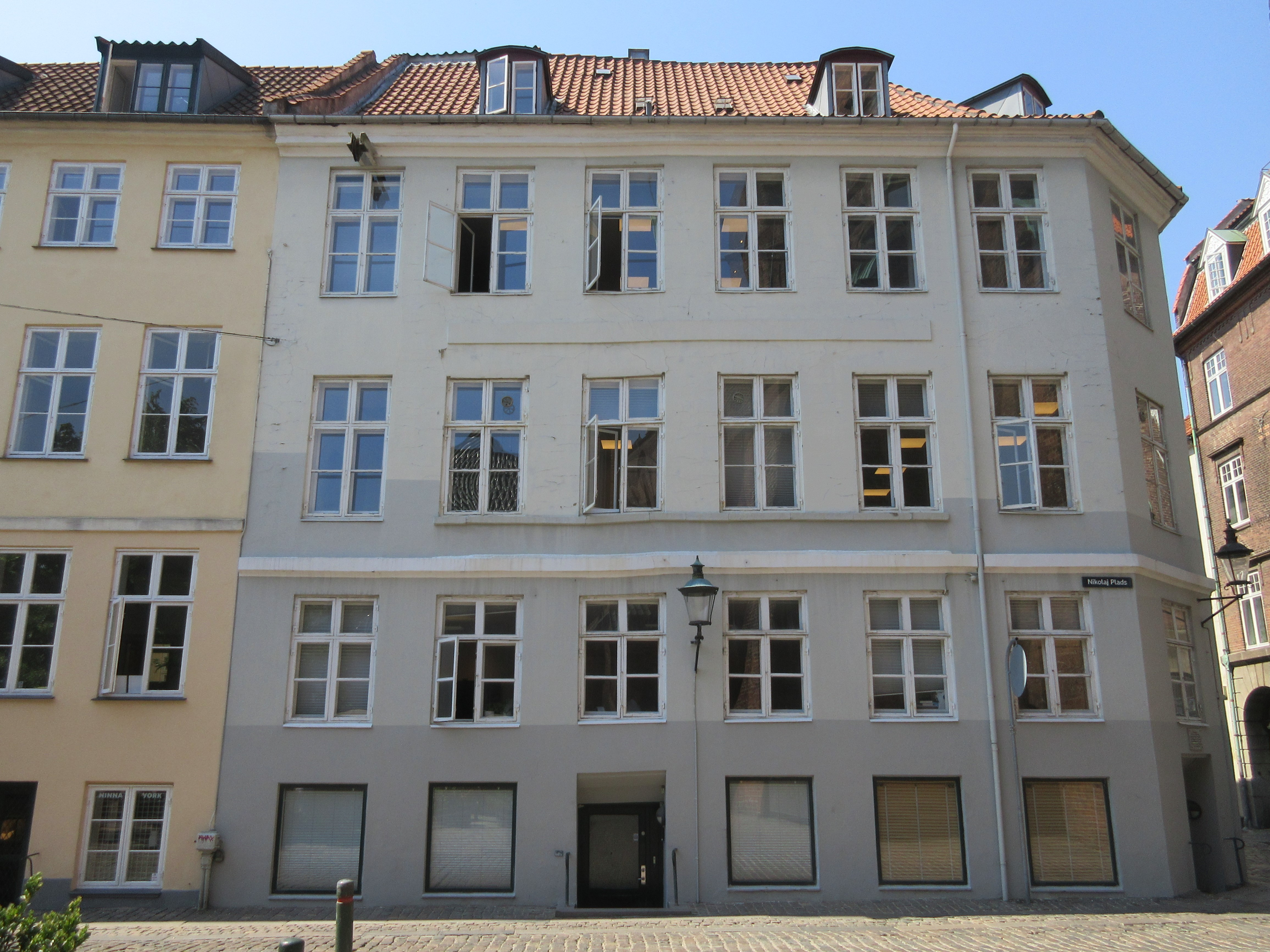
Facade on Nikolaj Plads
