= Henrik Cavling =

Danish journalist, news editor and author

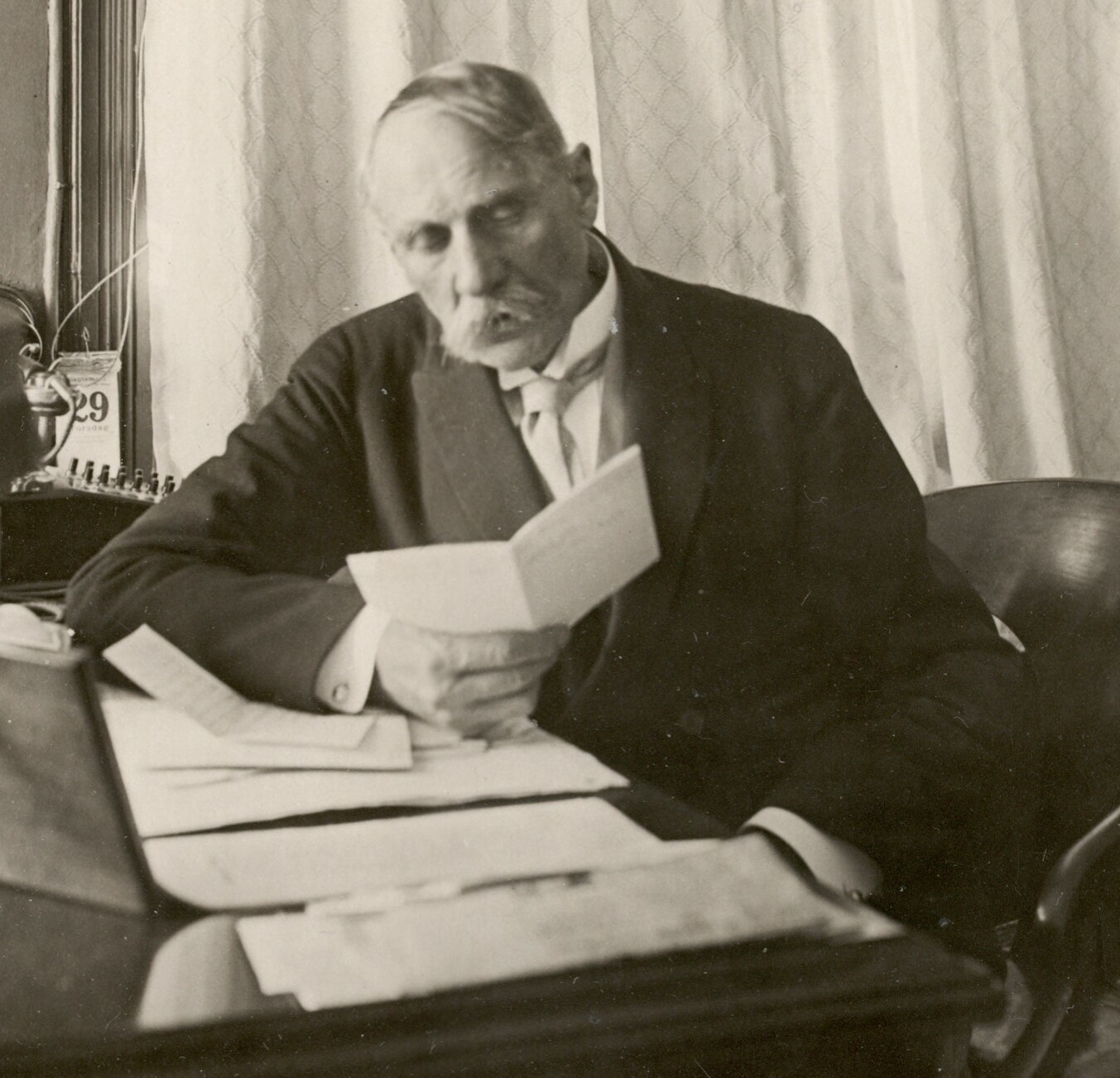
- Cavling on the last day as the editor-in-chief of Politiken, 1927, photo by Holger Damgaard.
- Born: Paulus Henrik Olsen; 22 March 1858; Kongens Lyngby, Copenhagen, Denmark
- Died: 7 August 1933 (aged 75); Hillerød, Denmark
- Resting place: Lyngby Assistens Kirkegård
- Occupations: Biographer journalist writer

Paulus Henrik Cavling (née Paulus Henrik Olsen, 22 March 1858 – 7 August 1933) was a Danish Journalist, news editor and author.

== Biography ==
Paulus Henrik Olsen was born on 22 March 1858 in Kongens Lyngby, Copenhagen, Denmark.

He was the editor-in-chief at the Danish newspaper Politiken from 1905 to 1927. During this period the newspaper tripled the distribution from 22,000 to 75,000 daily readers, which made Politiken the largest newspaper in Denmark.

Henrik Cavling was the founder of the Danish Union of Journalists. The award Cavlingprisen, the most prestigious Danish award for investigative journalism is named in his honour.

Cavling died on 7 August 1933 in Hillerød, Denmark.

In 2017 it was revealed that Cavling bought a 10-year-old boy from Danish West Indies, who distributed his newspapers.

== Bibliography ==
- Efter Redaktionens Slutning (1928), autobiography
- Journalistliv (1930), autobiography
- Nogle avisartikler (1910), collection of selected articles.
