= Cathinca Olsen =

Danish ceramicist and painter (1868–1947)

Vilhelmine Cathinca Olsen (born 3 August 1868, Copenhagen – died 13 September 1947, Copenhagen) was a Danish ceramicist, painter, and designer. She won a Gold Medal at the 1925 International Exhibition of Modern Decorative and Industrial Arts.

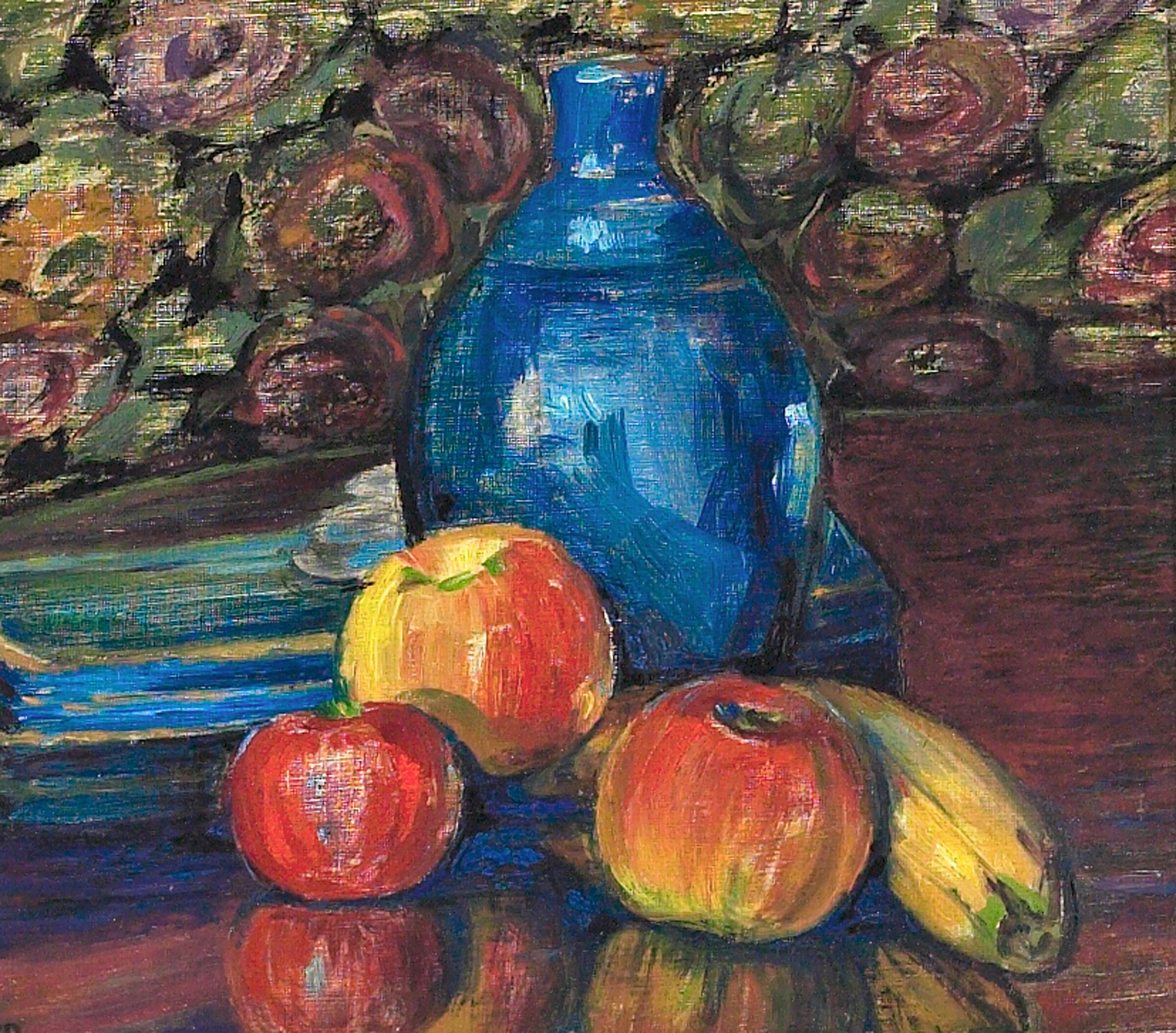
Still life with fruits and a blue vase. Oil painting.

== Early life and education ==
Olsen was born in Copenhagen. Her first and middle names are alternatively spelled as 'Wilhelmine' and 'Kathinka' in some sources. She began working with Bing & Grøndahl's porcelain factory in 1896, initially producing decorative porcelain pieces under the influence of artists such as J. F. Willumsen.

== Career and artistic style ==
Olsen worked in stoneware production with the manufacturer Bing & Grøndahl during their transition to stoneware production under the architect Carl Petersen around 1912.

Olsen's work is primarily defined by its natural subjects. Her ceramic work most often featured stylized plant motifs, such as leaves and flowers. In her early work, she painted both under and over the glaze. Over time, she shifted to carving designs directly into unfired clay before applying glaze, a technique that defined her later pieces. She frequently used ochre and black accents to emphasize form and texture.

Between 1928 and 1929, Olsen traveled to India with journalist Ellen Hørup. Their journey introduced new visual influences that enriched her design vocabulary.

In addition to ceramics, Olsen produced drawings and paintings utilizing watercolor, pencil, and ink. Most of these pieces are undated; however, dated pieces range from 1911 to 1928. Olsen's two-dimensional work employs bold lines and flat color.

Her work was exhibited in a retrospective of women artists in Copenhagen (1920), and won a Gold Medal at the 1925 International Exhibition of Modern Decorative and Industrial Arts in Paris. Her work was also shown at the Brooklyn Museum (1927), and a joint show at Bing & Grøndahl in 1940.

== Legacy ==
Little information about Olsen's work survived. Most pieces are undated. Three of her stoneware ceramics produced with Bing and Grøndahl are in the Metropolitan Museum of Art's collection, though they are not on display. In 2008, an individual who was occasionally visited by Olsen donated 10 painted works, mostly studies, adding to their collection, which had already included some of Olsen's ceramics.
