= Frank Esmann =

Danish journalist

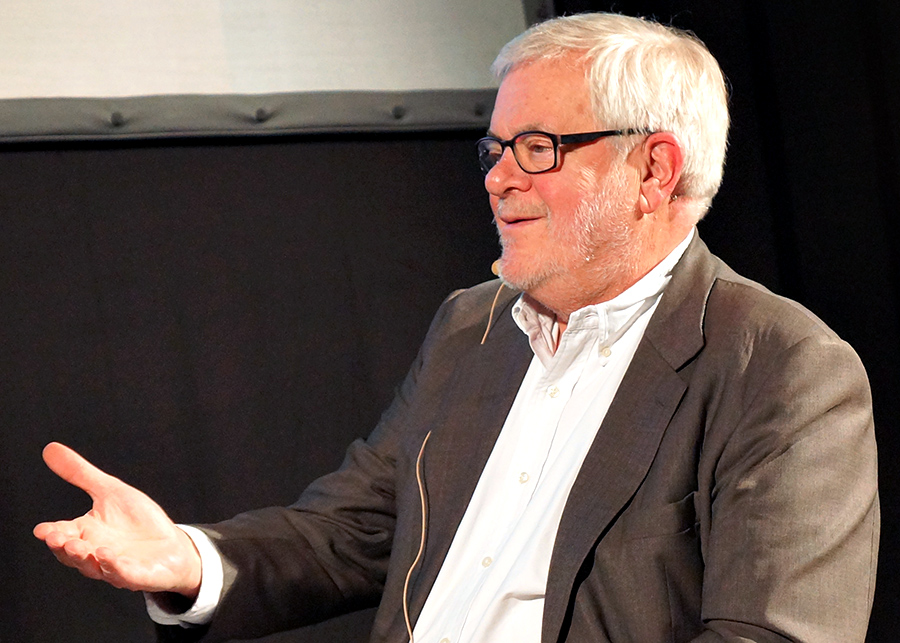

Frank Esmann (27 August 1939 – 27 November 2016) was a Danish journalist. He served as editor-in-chief of Weekendavisen from 1978 to 1984 and later worked for national Danish broadcaster DR.

== Biography ==
Esmann was born in Odense and was educated as a journalist from the Danish School of Journalism. He began his career as a foreign correspondent in Eastern Europe and the United Kingdom. He returned to Denmark in 1976 and served as editor-in-chief of Weekendavisen from 1978 to 1984. He then joined DR where he served as foreign correspondent in the US and Germany from 1988 to 1998. He then served as an anchorman at the DR2 late news programme Deadline.
