= Erik Refner =

Danish photographer

- Born: 14 January 1971 (age 55); Copenhagen
- Education: Danish School of Media and Journalism
- Awards: World Press Photo of the Year 2002; Cavling Prize 2009

Erik Refner (born 14 January 1971) is a Danish photographer and former pentathlete, soldier, and model.

He is best known for winning the World Press Photo of the Year award in 2002 as a student. He also won the Cavling Prize in 2009.

== Early life ==
Refner was born on the 14th January 1971 in Copenhagen and grew up in the north of the city. As a teenager he travelled internationally, including living for three months in an Israeli kibbutz.

== Adult life ==
In the 1990s, Refner was a sergeant in the Royal Danish army after which he spent one year as part of the Danish pentathlon team. He then worked as a model for seven years, before switching to photography after one of the photographers he was working with needed an assistant.

He won the World Press Photo of the Year in 2002, while studying at the Danish School of Media and Journalism, which he attended from 1998 to 2002. His winning photograph was of the burial of a young Afghan boy in Pakistan, whose family had fled to Jalozai to escape violence in their home country.

His early work was focussed on photography in conflict zones and took him to Afghanistan, Darfur, the Democratic Republic of the Congo, Palestine, and Iraq. He worked at the Berlingske newspaper for eleven years, and did commercial photography for Canon, Coca Cola, Maersk and Nike. He has been published in Elle, Esquire, Time, Newsweek, National Geographic, Phaidon, The New York Times, and Marie Claire. He won the Cavling Prize in 2009.

In 2015, he founded the IDIP.Agency to help photographers obtain payment for copyright infringements.
