= Lisbeth Knudsen =

Danish journalist

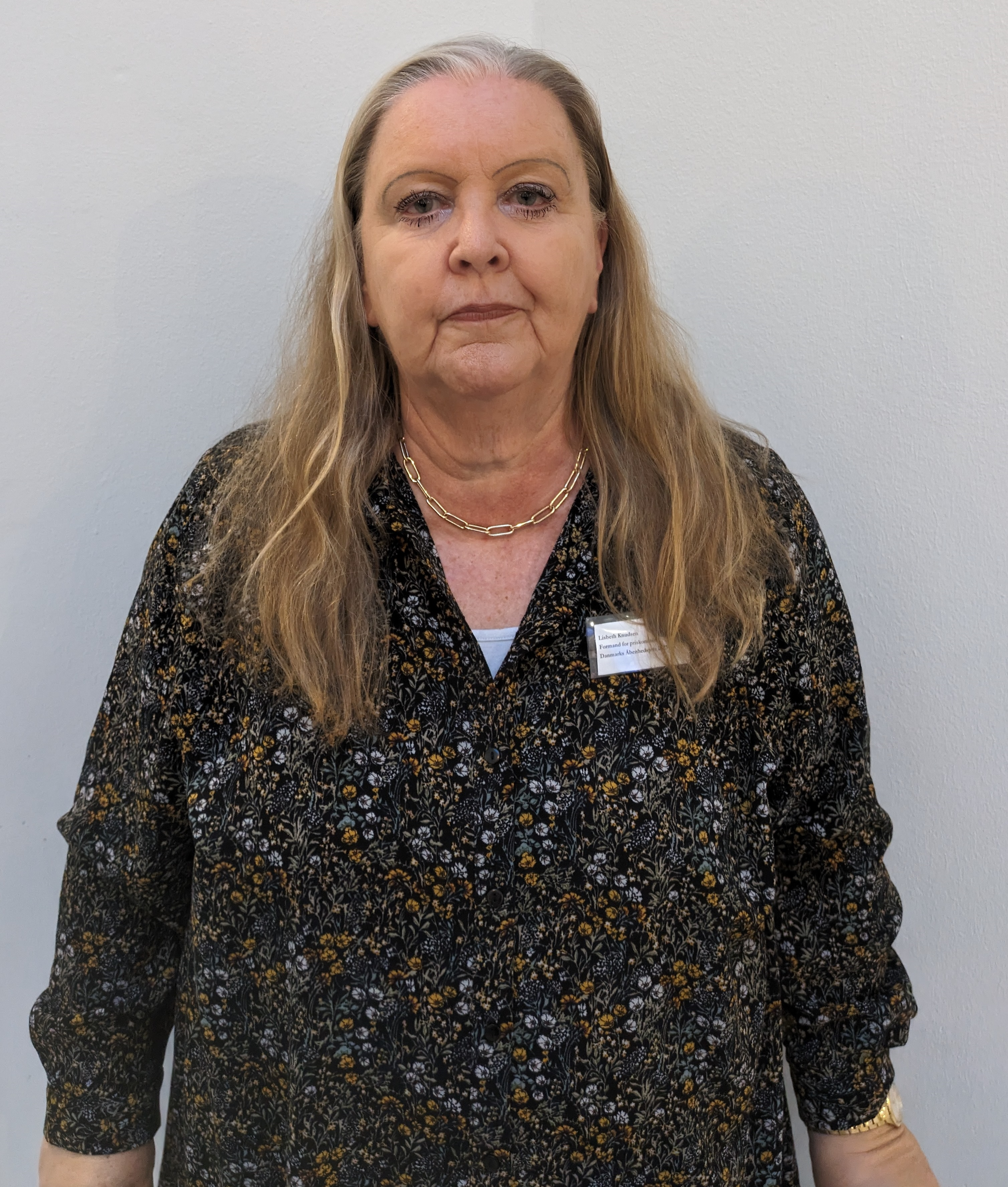
Lisbeth Knudsen (2023)

Lisbeth Knudsen (born 1953) is a Danish journalist and newspaper editor. After earning a degree in journalism in 1975, she worked in the editorial office of Berlingske Tidende. By 1986, she had become editor of the paper's Sunday edition. Subsequent posts included editor-in-chief of the Social Democratic newspaper Det fri Aktuelt (1993), news director for the Danish broadcaster Danmarks Radio (1998), editor-in-chief of Berlingske Tidende, and from 2015 director of Altinget and Mandag Morgen. In January 2016, she was appointed chair of the Royal Danish Theatre and has since served on the boards of several other companies and organizations.

== Early life and family ==
Born on 7 June 1953 in the Copenhagen district of Frederiksberg, Lisbeth Knudsen was the daughter of the manufacturer Sven Arne Knudsen and his wife Ruth née Buch. After matriculating from high school, she attended The Danish School of Journalism in Aarhus, graduating in 1975. From 1976, she enjoyed a partnership with the politician Peter Valenius until his death in 2016.

== Career ==
On graduating in 1975, she took up employment at Berlingske Tidende which had contributed to her training. After two years as a reporter, she was promoted to head of the paper's editorial office in Christiansborg Palace, the seat of the Danish Parliament. In 1984, she became editor of the business supplement and from 1986 she served as a member of the editorial board. She was appointed editor of the paper's Sunday edition in 1988.

During this period, Knudsen also played an active role in the Danish Union of Journalists where she hoped in 1984 to become chair but lost to the left-wing candidate Tove Hygum Jakobsen. In 1990, she left Berlingske Tidende to join the union-oriented newspaper Det Fri Aktuelt where she became managing director and editor-in-chief in 1993.

In 1998, Knudsen was appointed director of news at Danmarks Radio with responsibility for both radio and television news. As a result of restructuring, the posting was discontinued in 2006. In April 2007, she became editor-in-chief of Berlingske Tidende as well as head of Berlingske Media. She had to retired from the post in 2015 when the Belgian concern De Persgroep acquired the company.

In January 2016, she was appointed chair of the Royal Danish Theatre and has since served on the boards of several other companies and organizations.
