= Dear Irene =

1971 drama film

- Directed by: Christian Braad Thomsen
- Screenplay by: Christian Braad Thomsen
- Starring: Mette Knudsen
- Cinematography: Dirk Brüel
- Edited by: Anders Refn
- Music by: Blue Sun
- Release date: 1971
- Language: Danish

Dear Irene (Danish: Kære Irene) is a 1971 Danish drama film written and directed by Christian Braad Thomsen. It was screened at the 32nd edition of the Venice Film Festival.

== Cast ==
- Mette Knudsen as Irene
- Steen Kaalø as Ebbe
- Agneta Ekmanner as Agneta
- Ebbe Kløvedal Reich as Claus (as Ebbe Reich)
- Birgit Brüel as hostess
- Erik Nørgaard as Thorsen
- Elin Reimer as lady with the hat
- Bent Conradi as Irene's colleague
- Kathrine Windfeld as Irene's daughter
- Nils Ufer as Journalist
