= Otto Fog-Petersen =

Danish journalist

Otto Fog-Petersen 20 August 1914 - 10 June 2003) was a Danish journalist who served as editor-in-chief of Berlingske Aftenavis and later Weekendavisen.

== Biography ==
Fog-Petersen was born in Nibe outside Aalborg and attended Sorø Academy. He was educated from Jydske Tidende. He joined Berlingske Media in 1937 and was appointed to editor-in-chief of Berlingske Aftenavis in 1951. He was a driving force behind the establishment of Weekendavisen when Berlingske Aftenavis was closed in 1971.
