= Mette Davidsen-Nielsen =

Danish journalist (born 1965)

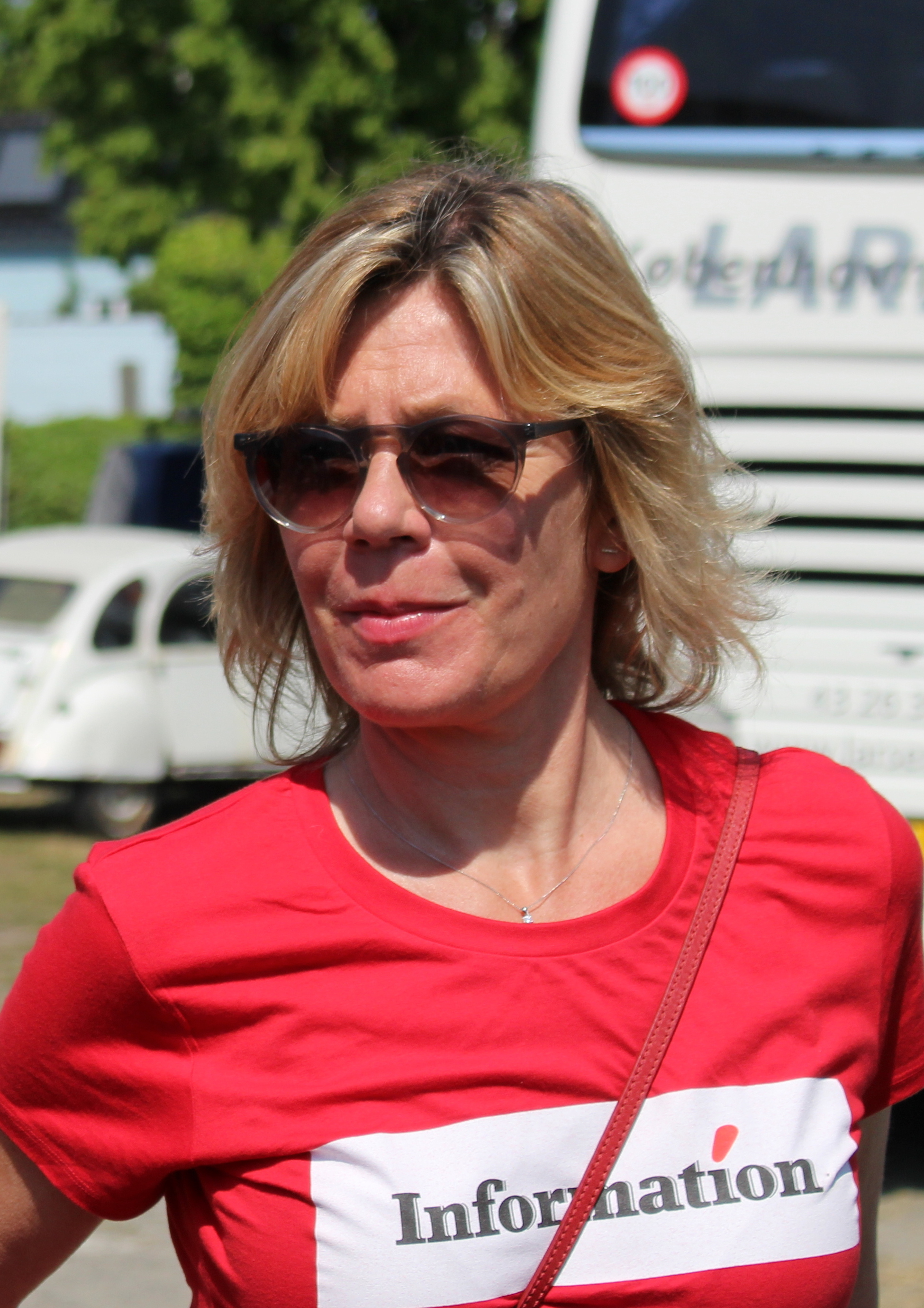
- Born: 10 May 1965 (age 61)
- Occupation: Journalist

Mette Davidsen-Nielsen (born 10 May 1965 in Frederiksberg) is a Danish journalist, who was the CEO for Dagbladet Information from 2010 to 2016. Since 2016, she has been the cultural editor for Politiken.
