= Eks Libris =

Danish comic strip

- Author(s): Sussi Bach and Frank Madsen
- Website: Official site
- Current status/schedule: Ongoing/weekly
- Launch date: 2009
- Genre(s): Humor

Eks Libris is a weekly satirical comic strip with stories from the literary world that is published in the Danish newspaper Weekendavisen's literary supplement Bøger. It is written by Frank Madsen and drawn by Sussi Bech. It was from September 2009 to October 2010 co-written by Mette Finderup. The newspaper strips is published annually in booklets by Forlaget Eudor.

== Characters ==
Characters include the writer Finn Sysholm, the poet Sune Lynder, two librarians, two booksellers and a group of editors from the fictional publishing house Buch Binders. A number of real people have also made guest appearances in the comic strip, including authors Ib Michael, Klaus Rifbjerg and Minister of Culture Per Stig Møller.

== Publication ==
The comic strips from Weekendavisen has been published in booklets by Forlaget Eudor:

- Eks Libris 1: Problemer med Carsten Jensen-robotten i Zone 7!
- Eks Libris 2: Tænk på signalværdien!
- Eks Libris 3: Jyderne er mægtig flinke… men stille!
- Eks Libris 4: Lotte går til parterapi!
- Eks Libris 5: Zenia Nyker genopliver Kulturrrrradikalismen
- Eks Libris 6: Finn Sysholm går i sort!
- Eks Libris 7: Bob Dylan svarer ikke
- Eks Libris 8: Dr. Lidegaard og Mr. Hyde
