= Dags-Telegrafen =

Daily newspaper in Denmark (1864–1891)

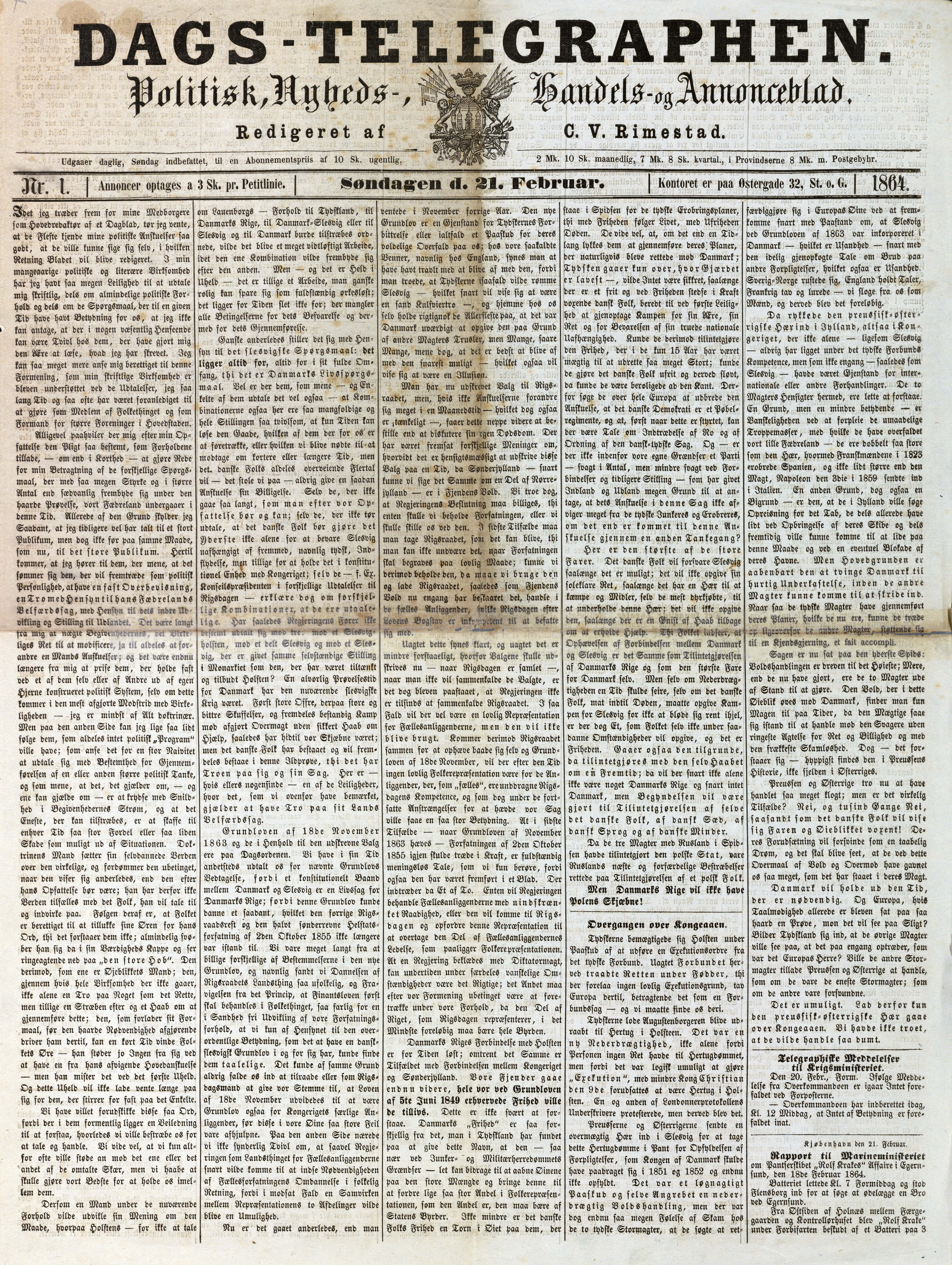
- A cover page of Dags-Telegrafen dated 1864
- Type: Daily newspaper
- Founder: J. Christian Ferslew
- Founded: 2 January 1864
- Ceased publication: 30 June 1891
- Political alignment: Conservatism
- Language: Danish
- Headquarters: Copenhagen
- Country: Denmark

Dags-Telegrafen (Danish: Daily Telegraph) was a Danish language conservative newspaper which was published in Copenhagen, Denmark, in the period of 1864–1891.

== History and profile ==
Dags-Telegrafen was established by J. Christian Ferslew in Copenhagen in 1864. Its first issue appeared on 2 January that year. The paper had a conservative stance and was the first of such newspapers in Denmark. In fact, it was affiliated with the Conservative Party. The paper was headquartered in Copenhagen.

In first half of the 1870s Dags-Telegrafen became one of the best selling newspapers in the country. An evening edition of the paper, Nationaltidende, was launched in 1876. Sophus Peter Tromholt published his auroral observations in Dags-Telegrafen which folded on 30 June 1891.
