= Politiken =

Danish daily broadsheet newspaper founded in 1884

- Type: Daily newspaper
- Format: Broadsheet
- Owner(s): Politiken Fonden (88.4%); Ellen Hørups Fond (4.4%); Others (7.3%)
- Publisher: JP/Politikens Hus A/S
- Editor: Christian Jensen
- Founded: 1 October 1884; 142 years ago
- Political alignment: Social liberal
- Language: Danish
- Headquarters: Copenhagen, Denmark
- Circulation: 88,597 (2013)
- Sister newspapers: Jyllands-Posten
- Website: politiken.dk

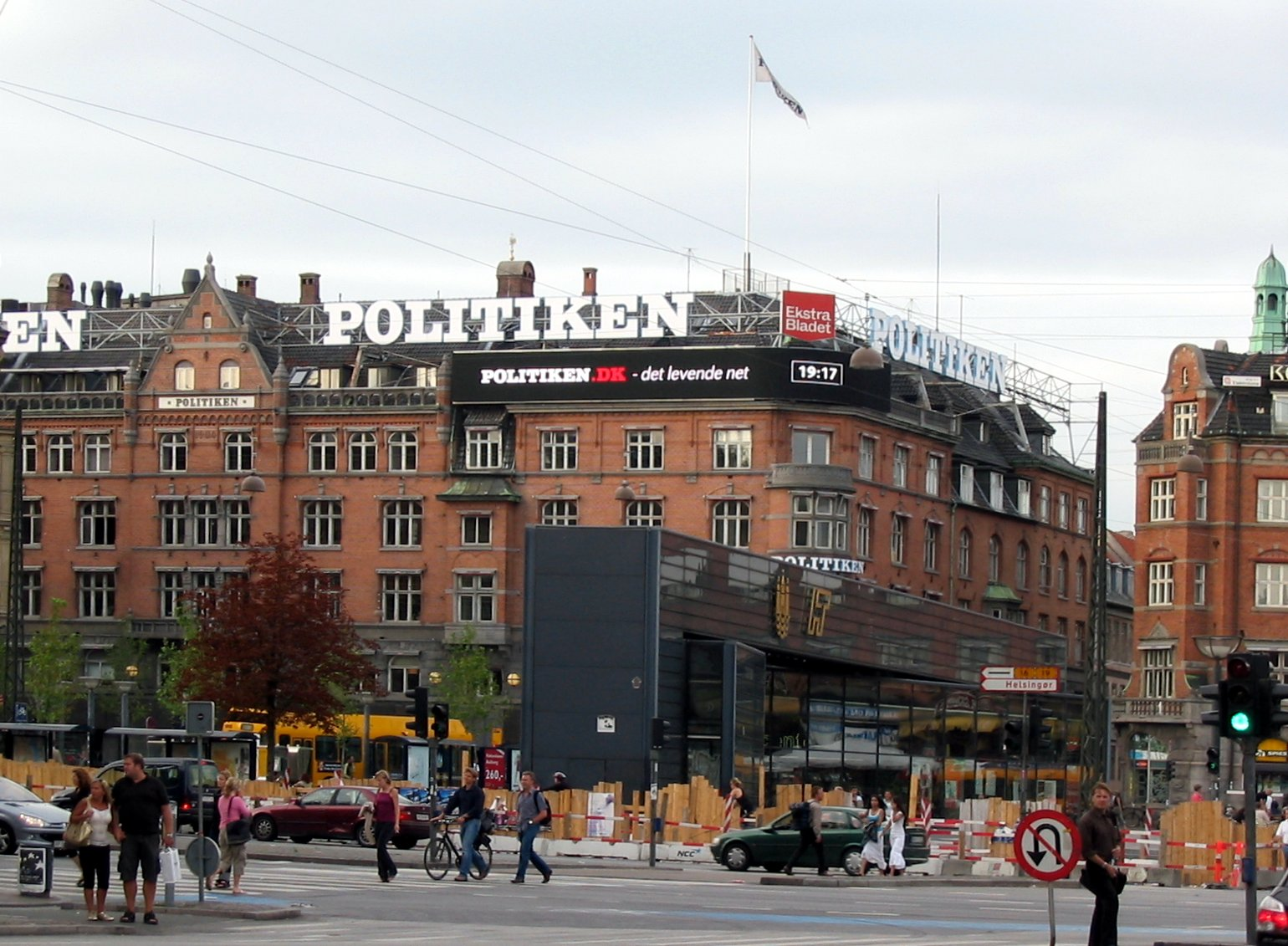
Politiken building on The City Hall Square, Copenhagen

Politiken is a Danish daily broadsheet newspaper, published by JP/Politikens Hus in Copenhagen, Denmark. It was founded in 1884 and played a role in the formation of the Danish Social Liberal Party. Since 1970 it has been independent of the party but maintains a liberal stance. It now runs an online newspaper, politiken.dk. The paper's design has won several international awards, and a number of its journalists have won the Cavling Prize.

== History and profile ==
Dagbladet Politiken was founded on 1 October 1884 in Copenhagen by Viggo Hørup, Edvard Brandes and Hermann Bing. Hørup and Brandes formed the newspaper after being fired as editors from the Morgenbladet over political differences. Hørup led the paper as editor-in-chief for fifteen years from its start in 1884.

After the death of Viggo Hørup and his wife Emma Hørup, their daughter Ellen Hørup was inherited the shares and continued her father's work. Despite the limited role women played in foreign politics in the early 20th century, Ellen Hørup emerged as one of the first female foreign policy journalists in Denmark. She was an active supporter of Mahatma Gandhi and featured his activities on Politiken.

In 1904, the tabloid Ekstra Bladet was founded as a supplement to Politiken and was later spun off as an independent newspaper on 1 January 1905. The paper established its present location in central Copenhagen at The City Hall Square in 1912.

In 1987 Politiken started its business supplement. The paper was published by Politikens Hus until 1 January 2003 when the company merged with Jyllands-Posten A/S to form JP/Politikens Hus. Thus, Jyllands-Posten became its sister paper. Politiken is published in broadsheet format.

The newspaper also publishes an international edition named Politiken Weekly which compiles the most important stories of the week for Danes living abroad.

In 2012, Politiken Foundation became one of the founding members of the European Press Prize.

In February 2020 Politiken and its editor-in-chief, Christian Jensen, had to pay a fine due to the publication of the sections from a book on the security and intelligence of Denmark in 2016.

Since 2016, Danish journalist Mette Davidsen-Nielsen has worked as the cultural editor at Politiken Foundation.

In November 2023, Politiken joined with the International Consortium of Investigative Journalists, Paper Trail Media and 69 media partners including Distributed Denial of Secrets and the Organized Crime and Corruption Reporting Project (OCCRP) and more than 270 journalists in 55 countries and territories to produce the 'Cyprus Confidential' report on the financial network which supports the regime of Vladimir Putin, mostly with connections to Cyprus, and showed Cyprus to have strong links with high-up figures in the Kremlin, some of whom have been sanctioned. Government officials including Cyprus president Nikos Christodoulides and European lawmakers began responding to the investigation's findings in less than 24 hours, calling for reforms and launching probes.

== Wartime reporting ==
On 28 April 1940, three weeks after the German invasion of Denmark, Politiken ran an editorial in which Winston Churchill was called "a dangerous man". The editorial was written by foreign affairs editor Einard Schou after a conversation in the editor-in-chief's office with chairman of the board and soon-to-be-again Danish foreign minister Erik Scavenius. The aim is thought to have been to please the German occupation force, though no other Danish newspaper took such steps at the time. Usually, it was enough to keep within the newly introduced censorship. The article led to 15,000 readers, about 10% of subscribers, cancelling their subscriptions in protest.

== Editorial line ==
During the early 1900s Politiken had a cultural radical political stance. Historically the paper was connected to the Danish Social Liberal Party (Det Radikale Venstre), but the newspaper declared its political independence in 1970. The paper has a far-leaning social, liberal and centre-left stance.

In February 2010 the editor in chief at the time Tøger Seidenfaden apologized to anyone who was offended by the newspaper's decision to reprint the cartoon drawing by Kurt Westergaard depicting Muhammed with a bomb in his turban, which was originally published in Morgenavisen Jyllands-Posten. Seidenfaden explained that "Politiken has never intended to reprint the cartoon drawing as a statement of editorial opinion or values but merely as part of the newspaper's news coverage".

== Circulation ==
Politiken started with a daily circulation of 2,000 copies. Its circulation was 23,142 copies in 1901. In 1910 its circulation rose to 41,400 copies. Later it became one of Denmark's leading newspapers in terms of both circulated copies and number of readers. Its circulation was 165,615 copies in 1950. During the last six months of 1957 the paper had a circulation of 148,169 copies on weekdays. It fell to 142,847 copies in 1960. The circulation of the paper was 134,728 in 1970, 138,921 copies in 1980 and 152,435 copies in 1990. During the second half of 1997 its circulation was 146,000 copies on weekdays.

Politiken had a circulation of 143,000 copies on weekdays and 185,000 copies on Sundays in the first quarter of 2000, making it the third best selling newspaper in the country. It was 142,780 copies in 2000. In 2002 it was the third best-selling newspaper in the country with a circulation of 142,000 copies. The circulation of the paper was 137,000 copies in 2003, making it again the third best selling newspaper in the country. In 2004 the paper had a circulation of 134,000 copies.

The circulation of Politiken was 110,230 copies in 2007. The number of copies sold per day in the first half of 2012 were 97,820 on weekdays and Saturdays, and 120,411 on Sundays. The same year the number of readers were 375,000 on weekdays and Saturdays, and 479,000 readers on Sundays. The paper had a circulation of 88,597 copies in 2013.

Its online newspaper, politiken.dk, received around 800,000 monthly users in 2011 and was the tenth most viewed page among the members of the Association of Danish Interactive Media.

== Awards ==
Internationally, Politiken has received recognition for its design through the form of several awards. In 2012 Politiken was declared 'World's Best' along with four other newspapers in a competition carried out by the Society for News Design. In 2014 the paper was chosen as one of Scandinavia's best-designed newspapers in the Best of Scandinavian News Design competition.

The paper's design, format, and brand was given as the reason, when in 2010, the European Newspapers Congress awarded Politiken with the European Newspaper Award in the national newspaper category.

Politiken has also been known for its photography. Jan Grarup, winner of several World Press Photo Awards and numerous other prizes, was a staff photographer from 2003 until 2009.

Anselm Hüwe is one of the contemporary awarded photographers.

=== The Cavling Award ===
Cavlingprisen ("The Cavling Award") is a Danish honorary award for journalism. It was named after a former reporter and editor-in-chief at Politiken Henrik Cavling. Cavling award winners at Politiken:

- 1945 Henrik V. Ringsted
- 1946 Kristian Find (Findus)
- 1962 Jørgen Hartmann-Petersen (Habakuk)
- 1966 Herbert Pundik
- 1967 Sune Skallerup Sørensen
- 1968 Erik Nørgaard
- 1974 Anne Wolden-Ræthinge (Ninka)
- 1976 Inger Østergaard
- 1982 J. B. Holmgaard
- 1992 Svend Bjering Schmidt (Svenne)
- 2006 Miriam Dalsgaard (photographer) and Olav Hergel

== Editors in chief ==
Politiken has had a number of editors in chief since its inception. In some periods there were more than one editor at a time, causing overlap.

- 1884–1901: Viggo Hørup
- 1901–1904: Edvard Brandes
- 1905–1927: Henrik Cavling
- 1927–1937: Valdemar Koppel
- 1937–1933: Ove Rode
- 1931–1959: Niels Hasager
- 1941–1963: Poul Graae
- 1946–1959: Hakon Stephensen
- 1959–1963: Svend Tillge-Rasmussen
- 1963–1966: Bo Bramsen
- 1963–1970: Ernst Priemé
- 1963–1971: Harald Engberg
- 1966–1971: Arne Ejbye-Ernst
- 1970–1993: Herbert Pundik
- 1971–1982: Bent Thorndahl
- 1981–1993: Agner Ahm
- 1981–1992: Jørgen Grunnet
- 1993–2011: Tøger Seidenfaden
- 2011–2016: Bo Lidegaard
- 2016-: Christian Jensen

== See also ==
- List of non-English newspapers with English language subsections
