= Alt for Damerne =

Danish women's magazine

ALT for Damerne
- Categories: Women's magazine
- Frequency: Weekly
- Publisher: Egmont Magasiner AS
- Founder: Dan Folke
- Founded: 1946; 80 years ago
- Company: Egmont Group
- Country: Denmark
- Based in: Copenhagen
- Language: Danish
- Website: ALT.dk (Alt for Damerne)

Alt for Damerne (stylized as ALT for Damerne; Danish: Everything for the Ladies) is a Danish language weekly women's magazine published in Copenhagen, Denmark. It has been in circulation since 1946.

== History and profile ==
Alt for Damerne was established in 1946. Its founder was Dan Folke, a composer. The magazine is part of the Egmont Group and is published on a weekly basis by Egmont magasiner AS, a subsidiary of the group. The headquarters of the magazine is in Copenhagen. The weekly targets women 25–49 years who have high-income and are well-educated. It covers latest news on fashion, beauty, interior design, food, beverages and home furnishing. However, during the 1970s the magazine covered mostly political news and investigative reports.

== Circulation ==
Alt for Damerne sold 75,000 copies in its first year. In 1950 the circulation of the magazine became 200,000 copies.

Its circulation was 89,000 copies in 2001 and 86,000 copies in 2003. The magazine was the tenth best-selling magazine in Denmark in 2006 with a circulation of 83,800 copies. In February 2007 its circulation was 75,273 copies. During the first half of 2007 the circulation of the weekly was 76,010 copies. It fell to 75,300 copies in the last six months of 2007. The magazine had a circulation of 73,000 copies in 2008. It fell to 66,000 copies in 2009 and to 61,059 copies in 2010. The circulation of the magazine was 55,386 copies in 2011 and 49,415 copies in 2012. The weekly had a circulation of 44,604 copies between July and December 2013, making it one of the ten best-selling magazines in Denmark.

== See also ==
- List of magazines in Denmark
