= Ellen Hørup =

Danish journalist, non-fiction writer

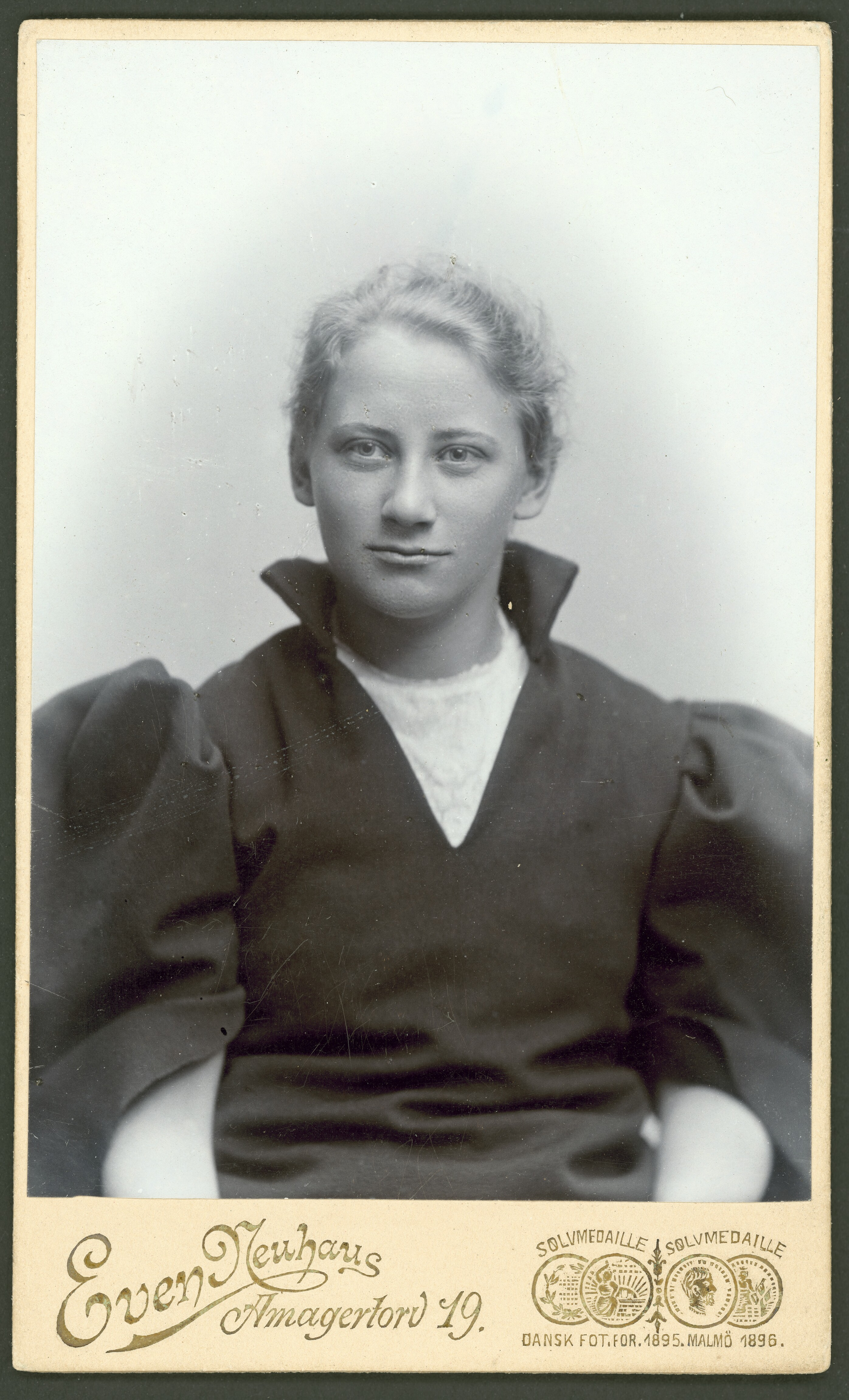
- Born: 29 December 1871
- Died: 25 March 1953; Copenhagen
- Occupations: Journalist, feminist, pacifist, anti-fascist
- Parents: Viggo Hørup (father); Emma Hørup (mother)

Ellen Gunhilde Hørup (29 December 1871 – 25 March 1953) was a Danish feminist, journalist, pacifist and anti-fascist. She wrote extensively in several languages including English in support of peace, improvements in childcare, and women's rights. Hørup was also an active supporter of Mahatma Gandhi, working with him for a time. She was also a translator and non-fiction writer.

== Biography ==
Born in Copenhagen, Hørup grew up in a rather radical home for the times as her mother Emma Hørup continued to teach rather than raise her daughter at home while her father, the politician Viggo Hørup, was known for his pacificism. Although she trained as a dentist, graduating in both Denmark (1893) and France (1894), she only practised for a short period of training practice.

In 1886, she married the lawyer Vilhelm Nielsen who soon became a leading player at the newspaper Politiken. For a number of years, she continued virtually unnoticed, except for adding to her emancipated reputation by becoming the first female rower and racing cyclist in Denmark. She was also the fifth female dentist in Denmark. In her early forties, she began work as a translator, producing an Italian version of Hans Christian Andersen's fairly tales. In 1912, she published her first articles in Tilskueren before joining Politikken as a translator. It was not until 1927 that she published the first of a series of long editorial articles in the paper. Thanks to her excellent knowledge of English, Russian and Italian, she is thought to be the first Danish woman who wrote articles on international politics before the Second World War. As a journalist, Hørup wrote more than 600 feature articles and editorials, and more than 300 shorter articles in newspapers, magazines and books about international politics, armament and disarmament, and imperialism. She also wrote against fascism and Nazism, against totalitarian governments, and militarism, including NATO.

She was financially independent after the death of her mother as she inherited shares in the paper her father had started. Continuing her father's work, she was an active supporter of the Indian Congress Party and Mahatma Gandhi. Together with the ceramic artist Cathinca Olsen and the Norwegian singer Bokken Lasson, she worked with Gandhi in the 1920s and 1930s. After the Salt March of 1930 in India, the British government tightened censorship, restricting news from India. Ellen Hørup along with her friends across Europe and America created a small informal group whose members visited India from time to time on their own. The group took an interest in the severe repression during the 1930-31 Civil Disobedience Movement in India led by Gandhi. Hørup stayed in India for four months during this time. She met Gandhi, as well as other Indian leaders such as Jawaharlal Nehru, Moulana Abul Kalam Azad and Subhas Chandra Bose.

In 1930, she founded Indiens Venner (Friends of India) together with a journal bearing the same name, reflecting branches of Friends of India organizations around the world. In 1932, she established The International Committee for India which held a number of conferences in Geneva.

Following a quiet period during the war, she resumed editorial writing in 1949, criticising in particular the lack of organised child care in Denmark and the unsatisfactory conditions in homes for children. She founded a children's home of her own and became a member of the Danish branch of the Fédération Démocratique Internationale des Femmes, now known as Danmarks Demokratiske Kvindeforbund.

Ellen Hørup, through her journalism, activism, and international organising, paved one of the key pathways through which ahimsa entered European consciousness.

== Selected works ==
- Gandhis Indien, 1931
- Magtens Vej, 1936
- Politik og Krig, 1937
- Hvorfor faar vi Krig?, 1938
- Hvordan Freden reddes, 1939
- Der er kun en Krig, 1946
- Kapitalisme, kommunisme og krig, 1949

== See also ==
- List of peace activists
