= Paul Geleff =

Danish socialist organizer

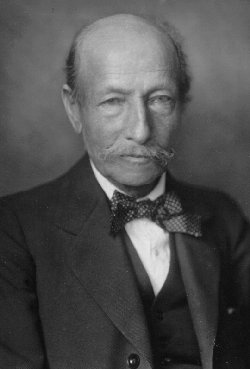
Paul Johansen Geleff

Paul Johansen Geleff (January 6, 1842 – May 16, 1928) was a Danish socialist organizer. He was one of the founders of the socialist movement in Denmark.

Geleff completed his education as school teacher in 1864, and went on to work as a teacher and publisher. In 1867 he issued the publication Hejmdal. He was sentenced to pay a fine after having insulted the Prussian state in one of his articles. In 1871 he came into contact with H. F. V. Brix, and through Brix he became acquainted to Louis Pio. The three began organizing a socialist movement. The trio founded the publication Socialisten ('The Socialist') in July 1871. In October the same year they founded a Danish branch of the First International.

The organization supported a bricklayers strike and had called for a meeting to mobilize support. In response, the authorities banned the organization and all its meetings. All three were arrested in the summer of 1872. Geleff was sentenced to three years forced labour. Geleff had also been accused of fraud, but after re-paying the amount he was accused of having embezzled those charges were dropped. Geleff wrote a book about his prison ordeals, Under Laas og Lukke ("Under lock and key") was published in 1876. After his release from jail, he and Pio again begun organizing socialist activities. In 1876 he was one of the founders of the Social Democratic Party. In March 1877 Geleff and Pio emigrated to the United States, with financial assistance from the Danish police. Their intention was to set up a colony in America. After settling down in America, Geleff and Pio broke their contacts. Geleff wrote a short publication about his trans-Atlantic travel and split with Pio, Den rene, skære Sandhed om Louis Pio og mig selv ("The pure truth about Louis Pio and myself") published in 1877.

Geleff occasionally wrote articles for Den Danske Pioneer, published from Omaha in Nebraska. Geleff played a crucial role in formulating the radical agenda of the newspaper.

Geleff returned to Denmark in 1920, and lived as a pensioner with support from the Social Democratic Party. Geleff died in 1928. He was buried on Capri.
