= Viggo Hørup =

Danish politician and journalist

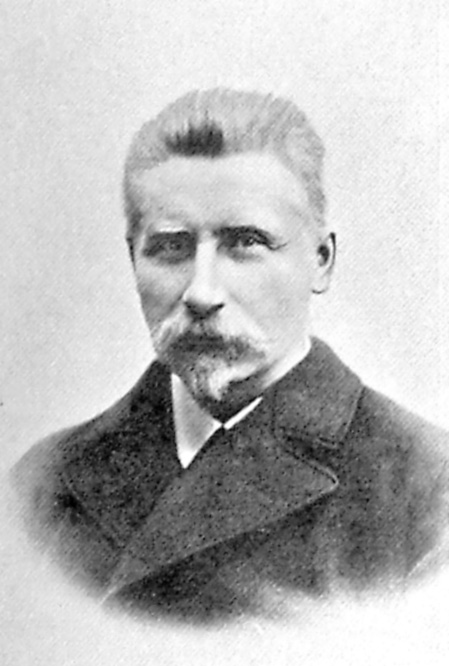
Viggo Hørup

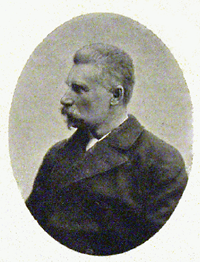
Viggo Hørup

Viggo Lauritz Bentheim Hørup (22 May 1841 – 15 February 1902) was a Danish politician, journalist and agitator. He was the father of Ellen Hørup (1871-1953). He was one of the most influential politicians of the Danish non-Socialist left wing.

== Biography ==
Hørup was born in Torpmagle near Hundested, the son of a North Zealandian schoolteacher, but belonged to the relatively well-to-do middle class. Already as a student Hørup took interest in politics, early joining the party Venstre after a short conservative intermezzo. From the start he opposed both the middle and upper class of the capital and the National Liberal academic circles. After some failing attempts he was 1876 elected to the Danish parliament's first chamber (the Folketing) and kept his seat until 1892. Hørup soon had a leading position in Left and is regarded as one of "the five Left leaders" with only the leader of the more traditional farmer wing Christen Berg as his equal. During the constitutional struggle against the prime minister Estrup from Højre he became one of the central figures.

First of all Hørup was a social liberal and anti-militarist in the Danish parliament. He rejected the military defence as an unrealistic, dangerous and expensive protection of Denmark and he founded a long-standing scepticism against the army that has affected many Danes. Besides he sharply turned against all chauvinist and nationalist points of view (and against all that he regarded as such). His domestic political views seem to have been a parliamentarian rule but first of all the recognition of the peasants and the smallholders as socially equal persons. Though not a socialist himself he also co-operated with the Social Democrats and his uncompromising political view about equality impressed some workers and socialists.

Perhaps his greatest direct influence is due to his work as a journalist. After some years of working for the more traditional liberal press he cofounded the radical liberal newspaper Politiken (Eng. The Policy) in 1884. Hørup was the owner and this was enough to make his daughter financially independent because she came to have shares. Here he attacked the conservative forces and their thoughts. He also connected radical authors to his case, for instance Georg Brandes, whose brother Edvard was Hørups co-editor and party colleague. This created a long-standing connection between liberal radical forces and the men of literature. In fact he himself both worked as a poet and a translator.

However Hørup's political influence and power were limited because of the "eternal opposition" of Left. As the leader of the most radical part of Left he was often at the odds with the more national and moderate wings of his party who disapproved of many of his opinions. He condemned the attempts of compromise with the Right and his relationship to his fighting companion and opponent Christen Berg was switching between co-operation and obstruction. An attempt of making a compromise himself 1887 failed and after his loss of his parliament seat he had to leave most of the daily leadership of his political fraction to others. However he went on fighting as an editor and also supported the attempt of Left unit after the resignation of Estrup cabinet.

In July 1901 Hørup, already dying from cancer, was made Minister of Public Works in the first Left cabinet, the Cabinet of Deuntzer. In 1905 his supporters founded the political party Det Radikale Venstre as whose mental inspiration he has since been acknowledged. His daughter Ellen Hørup (1871-1953) was a journalist, pacifist, anti-fascist and feminist. He died in Copenhagen, aged 60.

The long distance influence of Hørup has been immense. Left liberals and socialists as well as communists have referred to him and quoted his apothegms regarding him as the ideal unselfish and consequent progressive politician. In return his harsh criticism of national ideals also created many bitter enemies. In fact some parts of Hørup's person and thoughts are still not fully cleared up. Perhaps his legacy is first of all his wish of the creation of a political culture based upon regular political differences, upon an equal social evaluation and upon sense of realities.

He was the cousin of the poet Holger Drachmann and was married to his cousin the journalist Emma Holmsted.

A monument for him was erected in Copenhagen`s Rosenborg Have Park (Kongens Have) in 1908, sculptor J.F. Willumsen.

== Quotes ==
- Democracy is its own verdict, its own measure and its own weight! (1874)
- Nothing above and nothing besides the Folketing! (1878) (Of the relations between the houses of the Danish parliament, the Folketing elected by equal votes and the Landsting elected with the votes of the rich having more weight)
- What is the use? (of a proposed ring of fortification around Copenhagen, 1884)
- One must not light the fire under the pot of laws when the enemy's soup is on.
- Divide yourselves according to your opinions! (1901)

== Literature ==
- Dansk Biografisk Leksikon, vol. 7, Copenh. 1981.
- Politikens Danmarkshistorie, vol. 12 by Vagn Dybdahl, Copenh. 1964.
- Erik Arup: Viggo Hørup. Copenh. 1941.
- Torben Krogh: Viggo Hørup, Copenh. 1984.

Political offices
Preceded by Christian Juul-Rystensteen	Minister for Public Works of Denmark; 24 July 1901 – 15 February 1902	Succeeded by Christopher Hage
