= Nationaltidende =

Danish newspaper

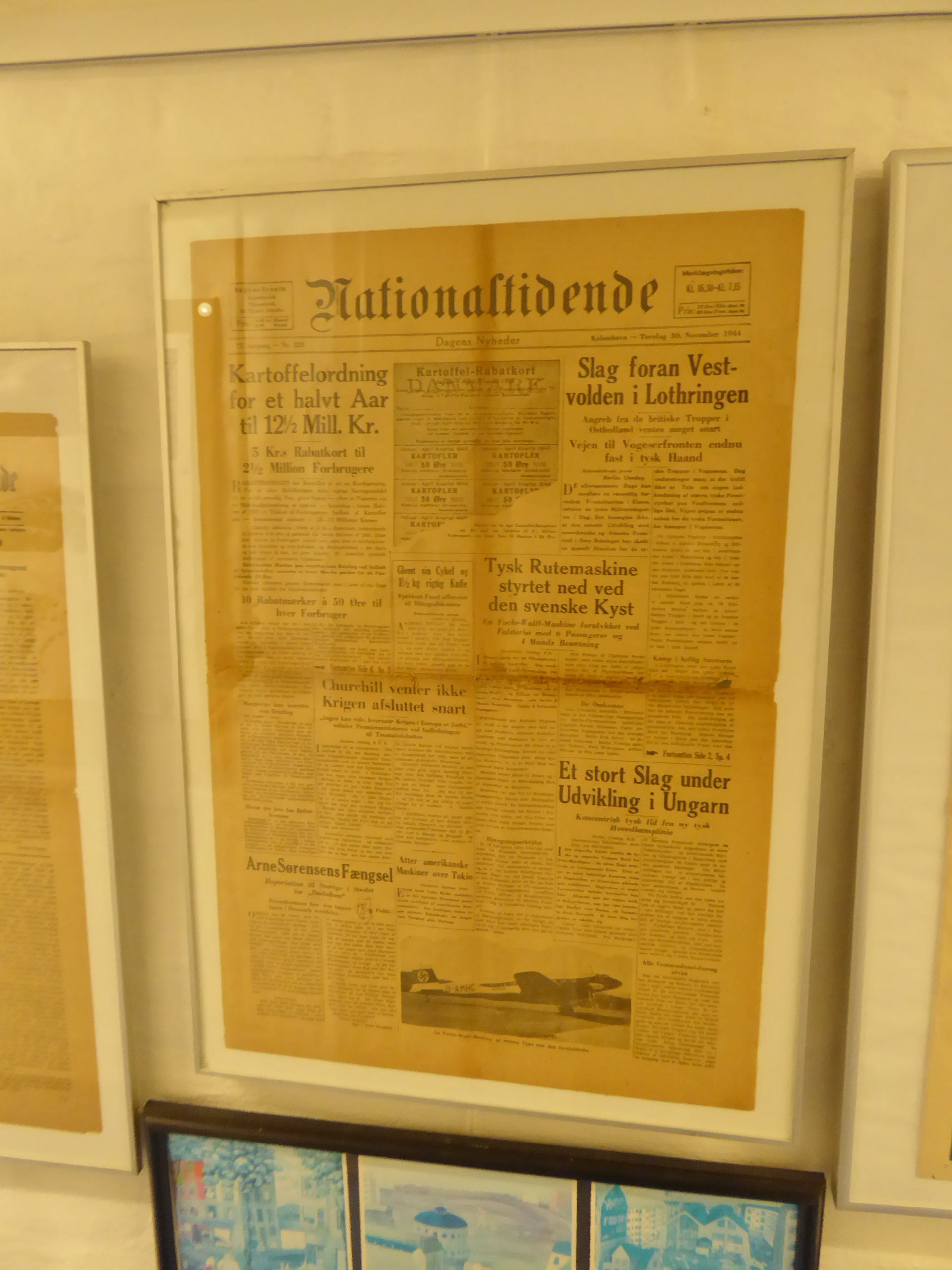
- Nationaltidende, 1944
- Founder: Jean Christian Ferslew
- Publisher: De Ferslewske Blade
- Founded: 18 March 1876
- Ceased publication: 3 September 1961
- Language: Danish
- Headquarters: Copenhagen
- OCLC number: 751710886

Nationaltidende was a Danish daily newspaper published from 18 March 1876 to 3 September 1961 by De Ferslewske Blade in Copenhagen, Denmark.

== History and profile ==
Nationaltidende was established by Jean Christian Ferslew in March 1876. It was started as an evening newspaper to supplement Dags-Telegrafen, also published by Ferslew, by September the same year the paper was published twice daily (morning and evening) as a high-quality newspaper for the bourgeoisie and the civil service. With its many supplements, Nationaltidende was Denmark's most richly presented daily. After breaking away from Dags-Telegraphen's management, Jean Christian Ferslew, the founder and owner, and Emil Bjerring, who was editor from 1876 to 1896, collaborated closely making significant headway in Danish journalism. Major contributors were Hermann Bang (society), P. Hansen (literature), (R. Besthorn) foreign news and Frantz von Jessen (politics). While it was a decidedly right-wing, royalist publication, it was also one of the most actively critical publications under the influence of Carl Carstensen who became editor in 1896. During the early 1900s it had a conservative stance which had its headquarters in Copenhagen.

From about 1908, Asger Carstensen attempted to develop the paper as the voice of middle-class conservatism built on universal suffrage. While Nationaltidende maintained editorial excellence, it increasingly ran into competition from Dags-Telegrphen (later Dagens Nyheder and Dagbladet), also run by the Ferslew group. From 1891 to 1920, the classified advertisement section (Avertissementstidende) became particularly important for the Copenhagen community. On Ferslew's death in 1910, the paper was beset by management problems. The same year its circulation was 10,000 copies. After modernization in 1914, the morning edition increasingly resembled Dagens Nyheder although the society and cultural columns in the evening edition continued in their own right. During the 1920s, Berlingske Tidende succeeded in attracting a significant proportion of the capital's classified advertisements, leading to financial problems and changes in staffing at Nationaltidende.

After Helweg-Larsen brought in a new team in 1926, the editorial situation improved but could not be maintained in the face of increasing competition from Berlingske'. In 1931, Gyldendal bought up the Ferlew interests, combining its papers as Dagens Nyheder, but without much success. In 1936, the paper was sold further to two private investors.

With morning and evening editions each day, together with extensive coverage of foreign news and culture, it was aimed principally at the bourgeoisie and the civil service. Politically, it took a conservative slant. After running into difficulties in the 1920s, the paper merged with Dagens Nyheder on 14 July 1931. In the 1940s, thanks to its restored name (with the component "national"), it prospered during the German occupation of Denmark. After the war, in the face of competition, especially from Berlingske Tidende, its popularity gradually declined until it closed in 1961.

While Nationaltidende was hardly competitive, it maintained a high level of reporting and attracted ambitious new collaborators. Furthermore, it increasingly became an important political organ, especially during the years of German occupation, thanks partly to the "national" flavour of its name. After the war, its popularity slowly sagged, leading to final closure in 1961.
