= Det fri Aktuelt =

Daily newspaper in Denmark (1871–2001)

- Type: Daily newspaper
- Format: Tabloid
- Founder: Louis Pio
- Founded: 22 July 1871
- Ceased publication: April 2001
- Political alignment: Social democratic
- Language: Danish
- Headquarters: Copenhagen
- Country: Denmark

Det fri Aktuelt was a daily newspaper published in Copenhagen, Denmark, between 1871 and 2001. It was the first socialist and the earliest newspaper published by a labor union in the world. In addition, it was the last major social democrat newspaper in Denmark.

== History and profile ==
The newspaper was established under the name of Socialisten (Danish: the Socialist) by the cofounder of the Social Democratic party, Louis Pio, in 1871. Its first issue appeared on 22 July that year. The paper was the organ of the Social Democratic party. Its headquarters was in Copenhagen. In the mid-1970s, the owner of the paper was A/S FagbevægeIsens Presse, a limited liability company. Then It became owned by the trade union movement until 1987, when it declared its independence and freedom. The paper was published by the Labour Movement Press during its final years.

The paper was published under different names. The original name, Socialisten, was changed into Socialdemokraten in 1874. It was used until 1959, when it began to be published under the name of Aktuelt. In 1987, the paper was renamed as Det fri Aktuelt.

Aktuelt had a Sunday edition which was published in tabloid format from 1966. In 1973, the format of the paper was also changed to tabloid.

Det fri Aktuelt ceased publication in April 2001.

== Political stance and contributors ==
Being an official media outlet of the Social Democratic party the paper had a social democrat political leaning. At the end of the 1880s it discouraged the immigration of Swede workers to Denmark. However, its attitude towards them totally changed in the 1890s, and it supported the right of poor Swede workers to obtain Danish citizenship. The paper followed the decisions taken in the Second International and adopted a positive approach towards labor immigration to the country until World War I. It also supported the immigration of the Russian socialist refugees and Jews to the country from 1905 to the end of World War I. The paper suggested in 1975 that East Germany was one of the places for Danish families to visit during the summer holidays.

Emil Wiinblad was appointed editor-in-chief of the paper in 1881. At the beginning of the 1930s the editor of the paper was H. P. Sørensen. Carsten Jensen was among its contributors. As of 1997 Lisbeth Knudsen was the editor-in-chief.

== Circulation ==
In 1901 the circulation of the paper was 42,000 copies. From 1911 to the 1950s the paper had a fixed circulation of 55,000 copies. During the last six months of 1957 its circulation was 39,445 copies on weekdays. The paper sold 41,000 copies in 1963. Its circulation was 39,400 copies during the first half of 1966. The paper sold 53,000 copies in 1973 and 54,600 copies in 1983.

The circulation of Det fri Aktuelt was 47,000 copies in 1991 and 45,000 copies in 1992. The paper sold 41,300 copies in 1993. Its circulation was 40,000 copies in 1994, 39,000 copies in 1995 and 37,000 copies in 1996. It further fell to 36,000 copies in 1997, to 30,000 copies in 1998 and to 28,000 copies in 1999. Its circulation was 26,000 copies both in the first quarter of 2000 and in 2000 as a whole, making it one of the top 20 newspapers in the country.

=== Legacy ===
The photo archive of the paper is kept in Arbejdermuseet (Danish: the Workers' Museum).
