= Louis Pio =

Danish politician (1841–1894)

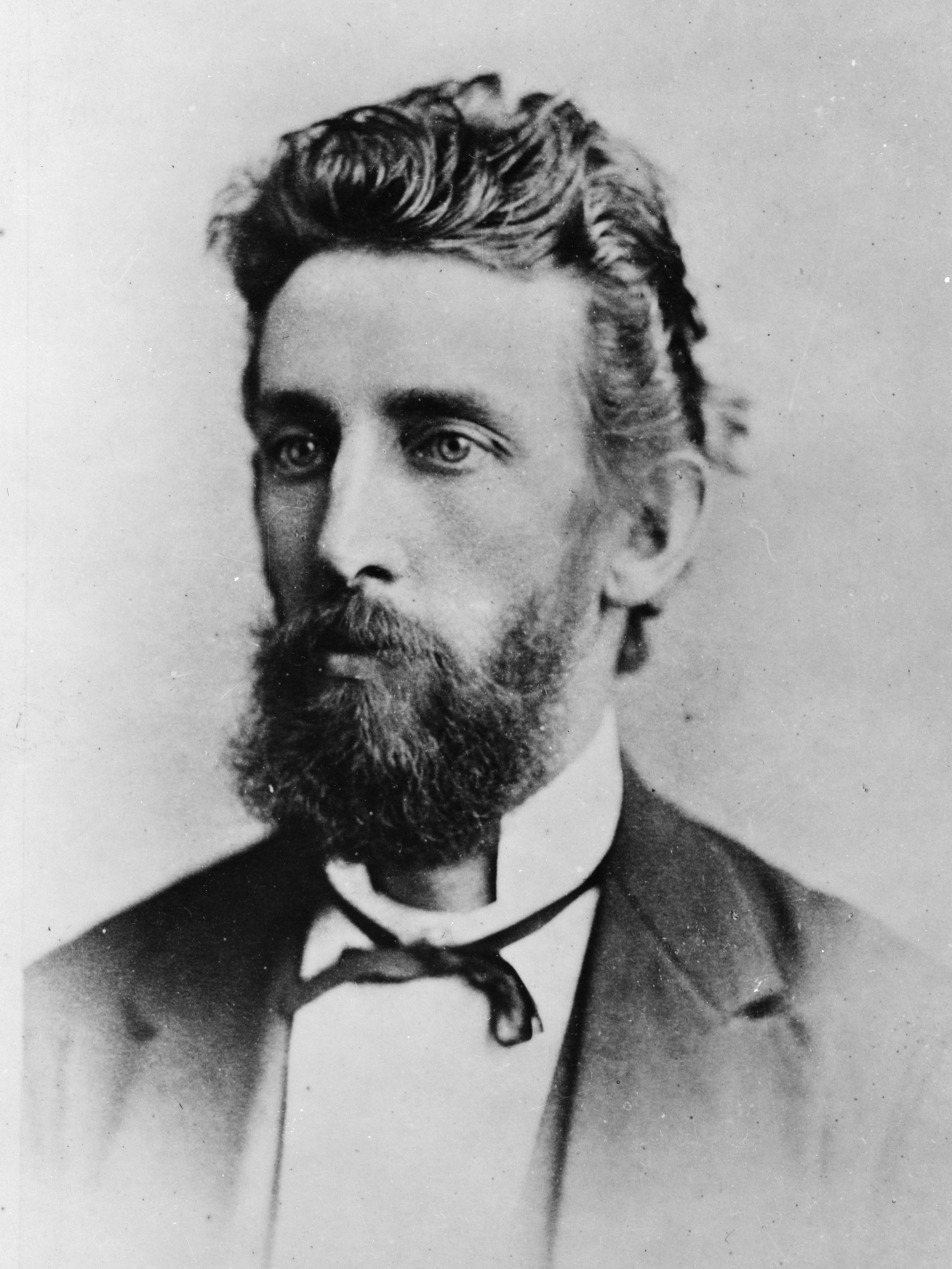
- Pio, c. 1875
- Born: 14 December 1841; Roskilde, Denmark
- Died: 27 June 1894 (aged 52); Chicago, Illinois, U.S.
- Occupations: Journalist, socialist political organizer
- Known for: Founding Danish Social Democratic Party

Louis Albert François Pio (14 December 1841 – 27 June 1894) was a Danish politician who founded and served as the first chairman of the Danish Social Democratic Party from 1872 to 1874 and again from 1876 to 1878.

== Early life ==
Louis Albert François Pio was born 14 December 1841 in Roskilde, Denmark. His father was an officer in the Danish Army, of French ancestry, and his mother came from a North Jutland bourgeois family. Pio's childhood was not especially happy: the family was poor and his parents divorced when he was 12. He was expelled from school due to disciplinary problems, but nevertheless managed to work as an adjunct teacher at a private school with a progressive curriculum (the Borgerdydskole). He tried, without success, to enter a teacher's seminary and, later, to obtain an officer's commission.

Eventually, he began to study Danish folklore and had some success as a writer, issuing a book on Holger Danske. In 1869, Pio began to write articles for a paper (Dags Avisen) established by his cousin Harald Brix. In 1870, Pio began to work for the Danish postal service, where he made the lasting contribution of inventing the red postbox, seen everywhere in Denmark even today.

== Activist for Socialism ==
Pio had become interested in socialism through his reading of Danish folk literature, which often depicted the oppressed joining together to oppose their oppressors. But it was not until 1871, when news of the Paris Commune swept Europe, that he established contact with formal socialist movements. In that year, he resigned from the Danish postal service, and began a written correspondence with the German-speaking branch of the Socialist International in Geneva, as well as meeting like-minded socialists in Copenhagen.

Together with Harald Brix and Poul Geleff, he labored to set up a Danish section of the Socialist International, following the English model of setting up trade unions. During the day, Pio worked as a tutor for a wealthy bourgeois family, and during the evenings he wrote for Socialisten, Brix's new weekly newspaper whose first edition was published on 21 May 1871. The paper was very successful, and Pio became the main writer for its articles as well as the main theoretician for the group of socialists. Ideologically, Pio did not hew to a narrow path, and presented ideas primarily from Ferdinand Lassalle and Karl Marx. On 15 October 1871, the Danish section of the Socialist International was founded, with Pio as its foreman. His leadership was controversial since other Danish socialists considered his style somewhat dictatorial, but he established good contacts with socialist movements elsewhere in Europe, maintaining an extensive correspondence with other socialist leaders, much of which survives today.

Pio is known for his tactical skill in employing strikes. He argued that three conditions must be met before a strike could be initiated: a majority of the strikers must be members of the International; there must be sufficient funds to sustain the strikers; and strikes must not occur simultaneously in more than one trade. These tactics brought workers concrete gains in the form of higher wages, and were the primary reason for the rapid growth in membership achieved by the international worker's association for Denmark beginning in late 1871.

On 4 May 1872 Pio, Brix, and Geleff were arrested for calling a public workers' meeting, in defiance of a government prohibition against such meetings. Widespread disturbances followed their arrest. Pio was sentenced to five years imprisonment. He was cultivated as a martyr by the socialist movement, and continued to write articles which were smuggled from prison and published in Socialisten. Released early, he reestablished himself as the movement's leader in 1875. The movement had become increasingly popular, and the newspaper, now called Social Demokraten had a wide circulation. But the movement became increasingly unhappy over Pio's authoritarian leadership style. In 1877, he left Denmark, to the great indignation of Danish socialists, who discovered that he had been bribed by the police to leave the country.

He, his wife (they married after arrival) and child emigrated to the U.S. They settled at Smoky Hill River, Kansas, where he founded a socialist colony. This soon failed because of the lack of agricultural expertise among the colonists.

He moved to Chicago, Illinois, where he lived in poverty, working at odd jobs. In 1878, he founded Den Nye Tid, a Danish- and Norwegian-language socialist newspaper, which he edited for only a few months. It was in operation until 1884.

Pio died on 27 June 1894.
