= Weekendavisen =

Danish weekly newspaper

- Type: Weekly newspaper
- Format: Broadsheet
- Owner: Berlingske Media
- Publisher: Weekendavisen A/S
- Editor: Martin Krasnik
- Founded: 1971
- Political alignment: Conservative, classic liberalism
- Language: Danish
- Headquarters: Copenhagen, Denmark
- Website: www.weekendavisen.dk

Weekendavisen (meaning The Weekend Newspaper in English) is a Danish weekly broadsheet newspaper published on Fridays in Denmark. Its circulation (as of 2007) is approximately 60,000 copies, about ten per cent of which cover subscriptions outside Denmark. According to opinion polls, however, the actual number of readers is much higher (290,000 in 2007).

== History ==
Until 1971 the Danish postal service distributed mail twice daily, in the morning and in the afternoon. When afternoon mail delivery was discontinued, Berlingske Aftenavis (Berlingske Evening Newspaper), which was the evening edition of the daily newspaper Berlingske Tidende, had to cease publication, and Weekendavisen came into existence as a replacement, known for the first several years as Weekendavisen Berlingske Aften. The owner and publisher of the paper is the Berlingske Officin.

Weekendavisen's logo contains the original coat of arms of Berlingske Tidende, including the words "ANNO 1749", and its volume count begins in that year rather than in 1971 because its publishers and editors regard it as a continuation of the original Berlingske Tidende.

== Characteristics ==
Weekendavisen is a highbrow newspaper containing in-depth analyses of society and politics as well as extensive coverage of literature and fine arts. The weekly covers matters of national and international rather than local interest.

Weekendavisen is split into four sections each week: Society, Culture, Books and Ideas, which covers science-related news and articles.

== Awards ==
Weekendavisen presents the annual Weekendavisen Book Award. The nominees are selected by the newspaper's corps of literary critics and the final winner is selected by the readers.

== Editors-in-chief ==
- 1950-1973: Otto Fog-Petersen
- 1973-1978: Henning Fonsmark
- 1978-1984: Frank Esmann
- 1984-1987 Jørgen Schleimann
- 1987-1992 Tøger Seidenfaden
- 1992-1998 Peter Wivel
- 1998-2017 Anne Knudsen
- 2017- Martin Krasnik

== See also ==
- Eks Libris
