= Danish Union of Journalists =

Danish trade union

- Dansk Journalistforbund
- Mediar & kommunikation (English: Media & communication)

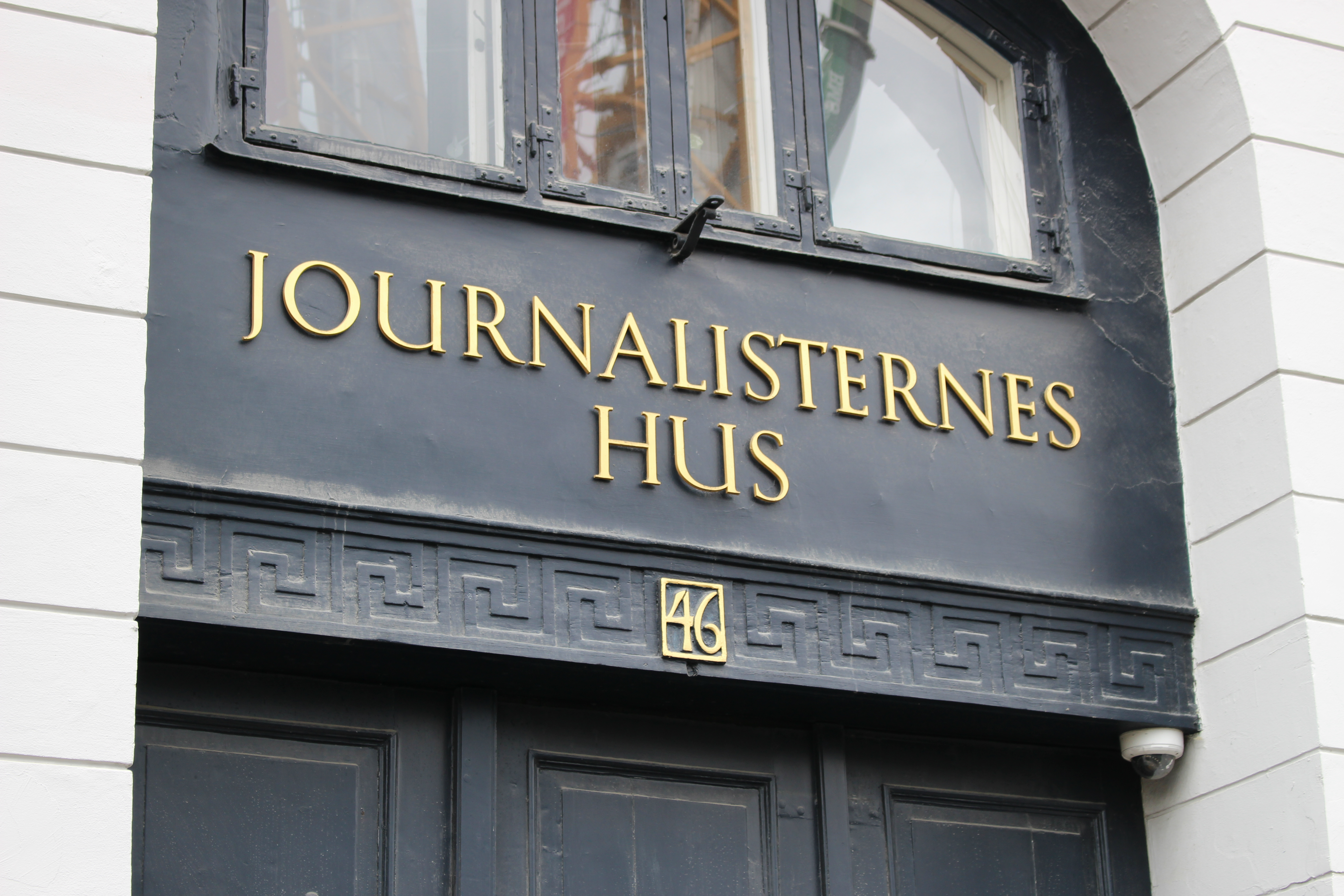
- Headquarters building
- Abbreviation: JD
- Established: January 1, 1961; 65 years ago
- Type: Trade union
- Field: Journalism
- Members: 15,500 (2012)
- Official language: Danish
- President: Tine Johansen
- Publication: Journalisten
- Affiliations: Independent
- Website: djmk.dk

Danish Union of Journalists (Dansk Journalistforbund, DJ) is a Danish trade union for journalists, graphic designers, communication officers, photographers, media technicians, etc., which was founded on 1 January 1961. Members are both permanent employees and freelancers. The President is Tine Johansen.

DJ is an independent trade union not linked to key organizations such as LO, AC and FTF.

The union has 15,500 members (May 2012) of which 2,000 are members through organisations for students in journalistic education.

== Publications ==
The Danish Union of Journalists publishes a member magazine Journalisten 20 times a year.

== List of presidents ==
- (1961-1971) Carsten Ib Nielsen
- (1971-1975) Vagn Fleischer Michaelsen
- /1975-1980) Carl John Nielsen
- (1980-1984) Hans Erik Larsen
- (1984-1990) Tove Hygum Jakobsen
- (1990-1999) Lars Werge Andersen
- (1999-2015) Mogens Blicher Bjerregaard
- (2015-2019) Lars Werge Andersen [da]; from
- (2019-present) Tine Johansen

== See also ==
- Danish newspaper cartoon illustrators Danske Bladtegnere
- Danish Travel Writers’ Association Danske Rejsejournalister
- The Freelancegroup Freelancegruppen
- Association for Investigative Journalism Foreningen for Undersøgende Journalistik
- Association for Labour Market Journalists Foreningen af Arbejdsmarked Journalister (FAJ)
- DONA – Danish Online News Association
- Network FOREIGN
- Police and Court Reporters Association Politi- og Retsreporternes Forening
- Pressphotographers Union Pressefotografforbundet
- Danish Sports Journalists Danske Sportsjournalister
- Association of Danish Teater Journalists Foreningen af Danske Teaterjournalister da:Foreningen af Danske Teaterjournalister
- The Danish Association of Traffic Journalists Trafikjournalisternes Klub i Danmark
