= Dagbladet Information =

Danish newspaper

Information
- Type: Daily newspaper
- Format: Compact
- Owner: A/S Information
- Publisher: A/S Information
- Editor: Rune Lykkeberg
- Founded: August 1945
- Political alignment: Progressive
- Language: Danish
- Headquarters: Copenhagen
- ISSN: 1602-2572
- Website: information.dk

Information (Danish pronunciation: [e̝nfɒmæˈɕoˀn]), full name: Dagbladet Information ([ˈtɑwˌplɛˀð̩ e̝nfɒmæˈɕoˀn]), is a Danish newspaper published Monday through Saturday.

== History and profile ==
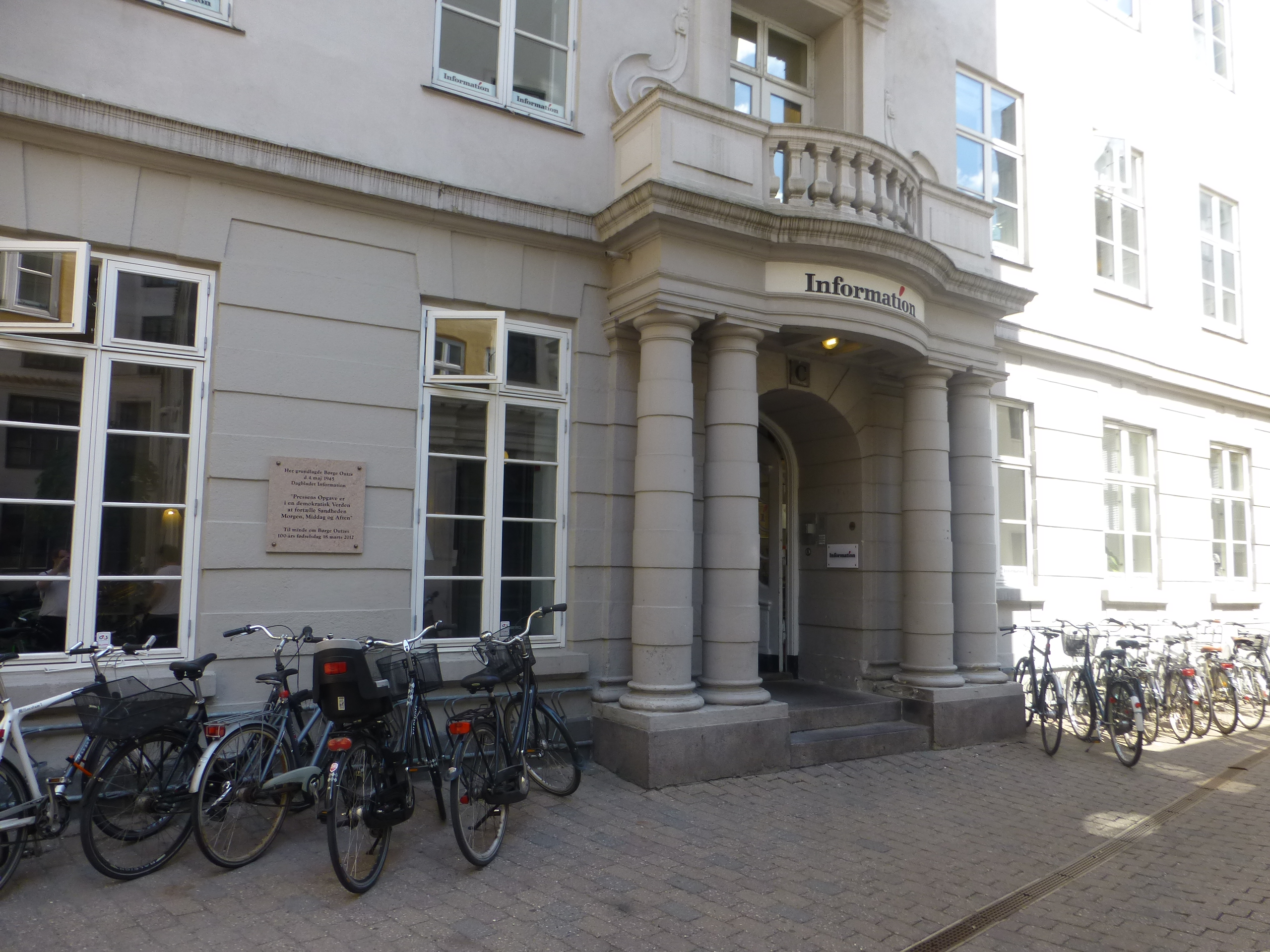
Entrance to the headquarters of Dagbladet Information at Sankt Annæ Passage in Indre By, Copenhagen

Dagbladet Information was established and published by the Danish resistance movement in 1943 during World War II. The paper was edited by Børge Outze, and was illegal during the war as it was not regulated by the German occupying power. Following the liberation on 5 May 1945 Dagbladet Information was a reality and was officially founded in August 1945. Outze continued to work as the paper's editor in chief to his death in 1980. It has its headquarters in Copenhagen.

Dagbladet Information is the youngest major newspaper in Denmark, and remains independent of the larger publishing houses. The paper is owned by A/S Information, and is published by A/S Dagbladet Information from Monday to Saturday. It is based in Copenhagen. In the 1970s, Dagbladet Information was one of the alternative media together with Politisk Revy in Denmark and covered all dimensions of new social movements.

The newspaper, despite being politically independent, is regarded as left liberal, or left-wing, and is known for being equally critical in its point of view of all political organizations. It prints letters from prominent conservative figures and it tries to see several sides of a case. The tone is serious and the number of charts and pictures is limited, comparable to the French newspaper Le Monde. Information has a syndication agreement with the British newspaper The Guardian, and often collaborates with The Independent for articles and reports. The paper covers in-depth analytical articles.

Dagbladet Information was published in broadsheet format until 30 November 2004 when it switched to a compact format. On 8 September 2006, the newspaper printed six of the less offensive entries from the Iranian Holocaust cartoon exhibition, which was a response to the Jyllands-Posten Muhammad cartoons controversy. The editor chose the cartoons after consulting the main rabbi in Copenhagen. Danish journalist Mette Davidsen-Nielsen served as the paper's CEO from 2010 to 2016.

== Circulation ==
During the last six months of 1957 Dagbladet Information had a circulation of 24,214 copies on weekdays. The circulation of the paper was 22,000 copies on weekdays during the second half of 1997. Its circulation was also 22,000 copies in the first quarter of 2000. The paper had a circulation of 20,000 copies in 2004, and 20,600 copies in 2005. In 2009, it was the smallest national daily newspaper in Denmark, with a daily circulation of 22,000 copies.
