= 1972 in Norway =

- Centuries: 18th; 19th; 20th; 21st
- Decades: 1950s; 1960s; 1970s; 1980s; 1990s
- See also: List of years in Norway

Events in the year 1972 in Norway.

== Incumbents ==
- Monarch – Olav V.
- Prime Minister – Trygve Bratteli (Labour Party) until 17 October, Lars Korvald (Christian Democratic Party)

== Events ==
- 15 June – The Norwegian pension age is lowered to 67.
- 16 July – Divers discover the wreck of the Dutch merchant ship Akerendam which sank near the island Runde in 1725 during its maiden voyage killing the entire ship's crew of 200 people. A large gold and silver treasure was also discovered aboard the ship.
- 25 September – Norwegian European Communities membership referendum where a 53.5 majority says "No" to joining the European Community
- The cabinet of Trygve Bratteli resigns as a direct result of the referendum
- 18 October – Lars Korvald becomes Prime Minister of Norway
- 18 October – Korvald's Cabinet was appointed.
- 23 December – Braathens SAFE Flight 239 crashes in Asker upon landing at Fornebu airport, Oslo, Norway, killing 40 of 45 people on board.
- The Norwegian Ministry of the Environment is established
- Molde Airport, Årø is opened for traffic
- The Rock carvings at Alta are discovered
- Tripp Trapp, the original Norwegian designed adjustable wooden high chair for children, launched and soon became a best selling item in Norway

=== Literature ===
- Bortreist på ubestemt tid, crime novel by Sigrun Krokvik.

== Notable births ==
=== January ===
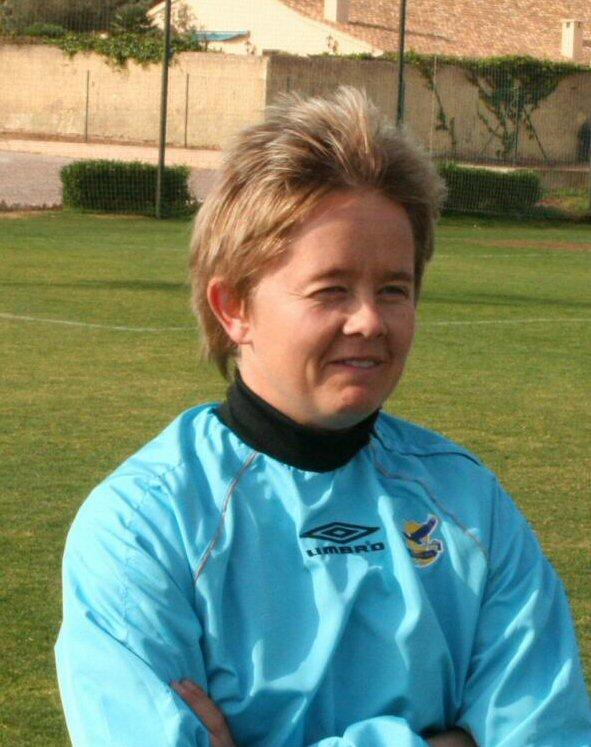
Gøril Kringen

- 2 January – Egil Østenstad, footballer
- 8 January – Lotte Søvre, sport wrestler.
- 8 January – Rune Støstad, politician.
- 9 January – Arild Andersen, footballer
- 11 January – Kåre Conradi, actor.
- 12 January – Espen Knutsen, ice hockey player
- 25 January – Anita Østby, politician.
- 28 January – Gøril Kringen, footballer.
- 31 January – Anne Holten, sport wrestler.

=== February ===
- 1 February – Nils Christian Moe-Repstad, poet (died 2022).
- 2 February – Jarle Wee, footballer
- 15 February – Asle Andersen, footballer
- 17 February – Johnny Jensen, handball player.
- 18 February – Glenn Solberg, handball player and coach.
- 27 February – Steinar Johansen, speed skater.
- 27 February – Kenneth Storvik, footballer
- 28 February – Jo Tessem, footballer

=== March ===
- 4 March – Nocturno Culto, musician
- 5 March – Knut Erik Folland, footballer and manager
- 9 March – Ingrid Lorentzen, ballet dancer.
- 21 March – Ole Bjørn Sundgot, footballer
- 23 March – Line Verndal, actress.
- 27 March – Anne-Kat. Hærland, comedian.
- 28 March – Jeanette Lunde, alpine skier and sailor.

=== April ===
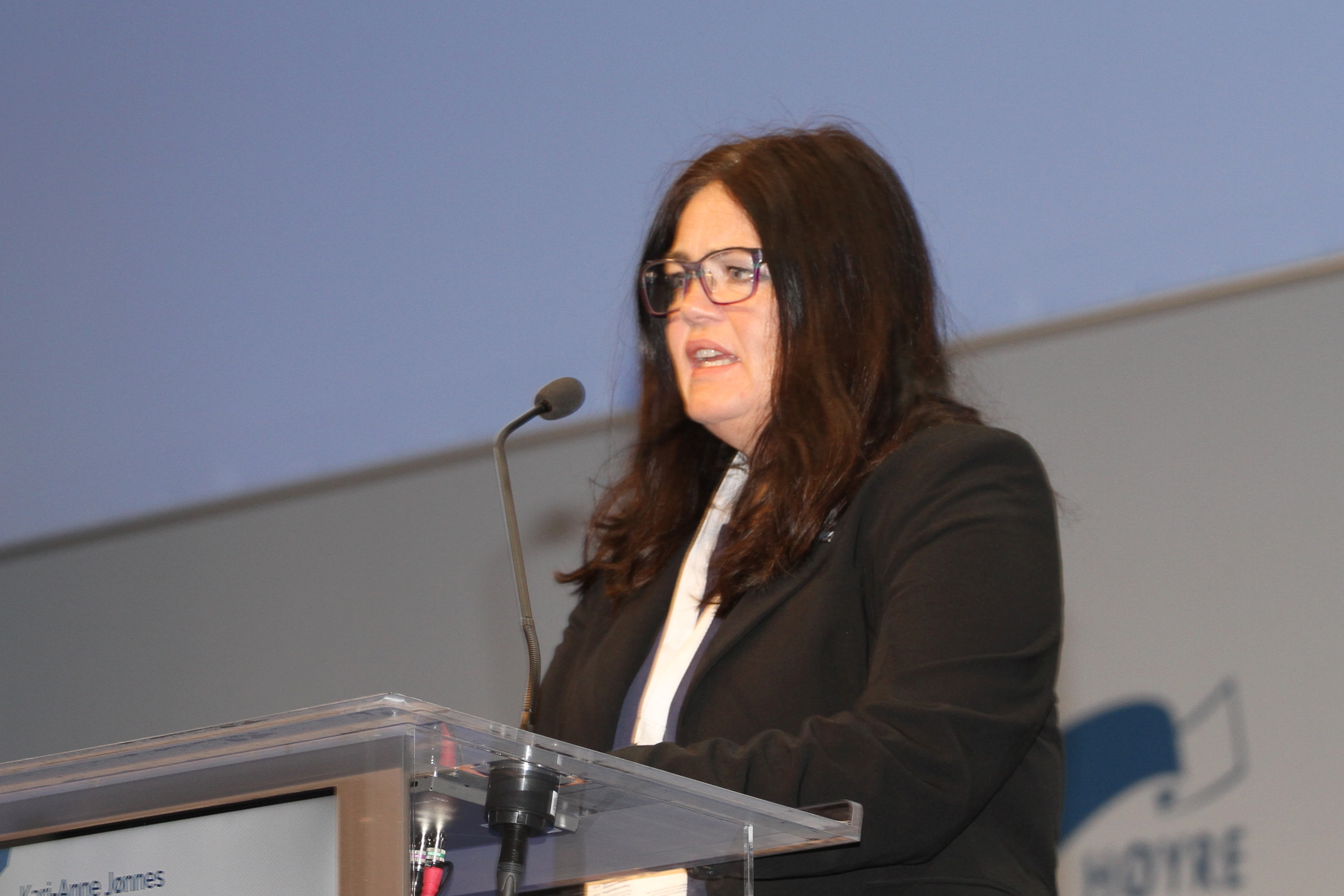
Kari-Anne Jønnes

- 13 April – Kari-Anne Jønnes, politician.
- 13 April – Hugo Rocha, Norway-born Portuguese sailor.
- 16 April – Arild Stavrum, footballer
- 19 April – Eivind Melleby, sailor.
- 21 April – Vidar Riseth, footballer
- 22 April – Jim Svenøy, steeplechase runner.
- 23 April – Barbro-Lill Hætta-Jacobsen, politician
- 27 April – Bjørn Arild Levernes, footballer

=== May ===
- 1 May – Steinar Nilsen, footballer
- 3 May – Gard Kristiansen, footballer
- 9 May – Christian Holter, footballer
- 12 May – André Nevstad, footballer
- 12 May – Sander Solberg, footballer
- 15 May – Rune Vindheim, footballer
- 16 May – Kirsti Husby, newspaper editor.
- 16 May – Frank Strandli, footballer
- 20 May – Bård Borgersen, footballer
- 29 May – Tor Åge Larsen, footballer
- 31 May – Frode Estil, cross-country skier

=== June ===
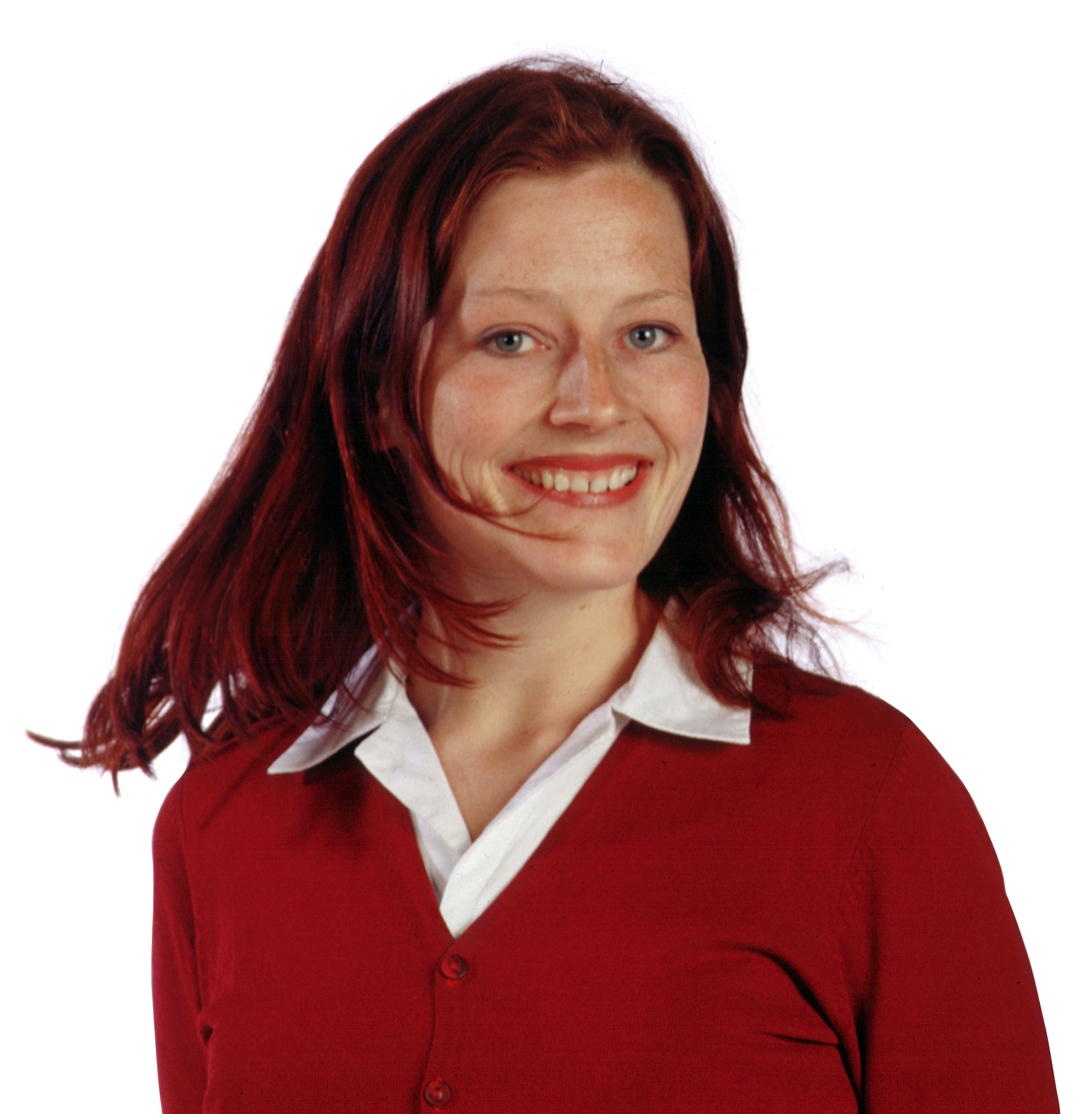
Synnøve Konglevoll

- 12 June – Jan Steinar Engeli Johansen, politician
- 13 June – Stig Johansen, footballer
- 16 June – Synnøve Konglevoll, politician.
- 17 June – Bjørn Tore Kvarme, footballer
- 24 June – Mette Gundersen, politician
- 27 June – Jeanette Nilsen, handball player.
- 28 June – Heikki Holmås, politician

=== July ===
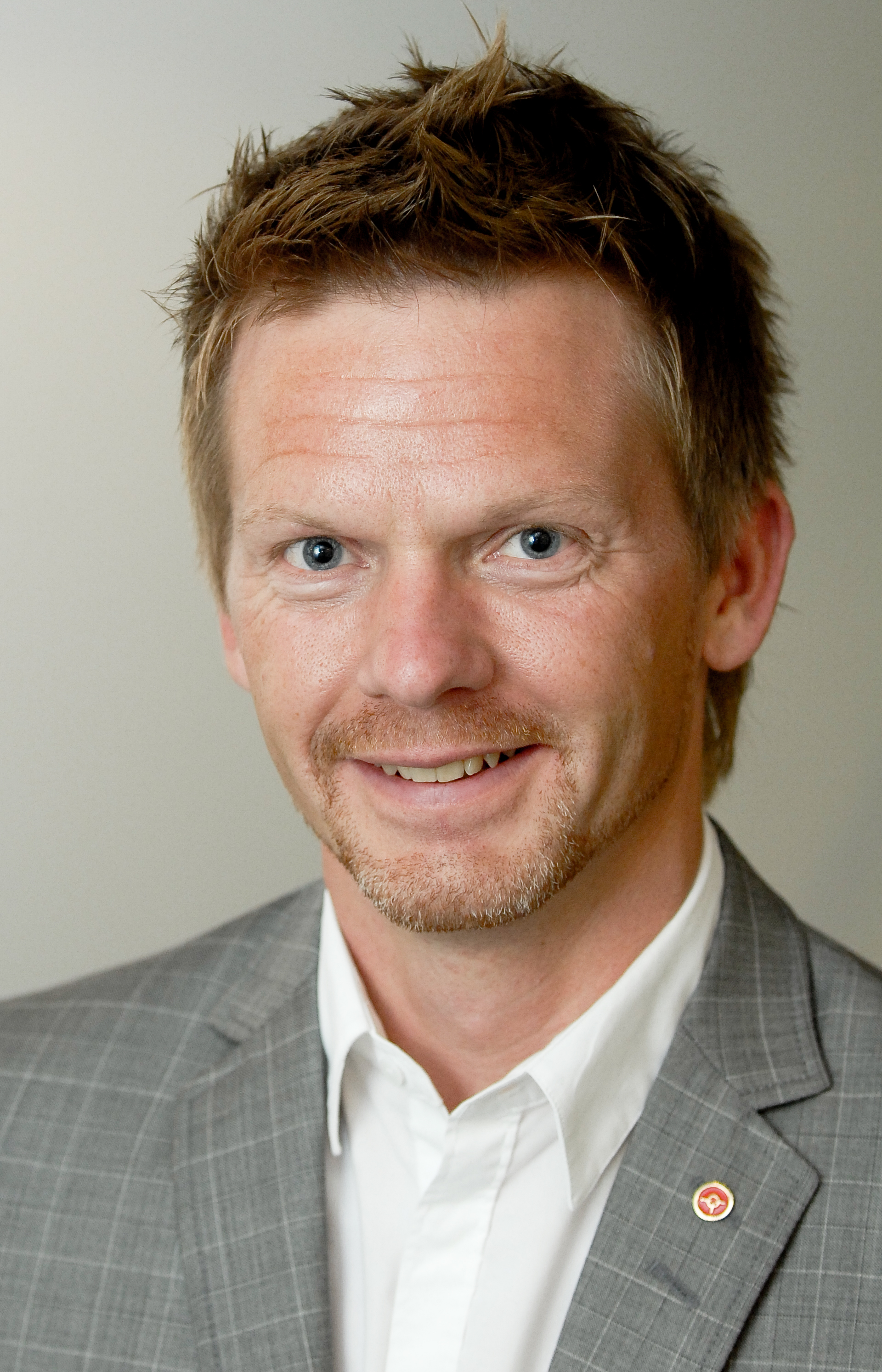
Tage Pettersen

- 13 July – Selma Lønning Aarø, writer.
- 19 July – Sigrid Moldestad, folk musician.
- 21 July – Marte Gerhardsen, organizational leader and politician.
- 25 July – Tage Pettersen, politician and sports official
- 30 July – Jon Olav Hjelde, footballer

=== August ===
- 1 August – Christer Basma, footballer
- 4 August – Øyvind Vågnes, writer, editor, and professor of media science (died 2025).
- 7 August – Vegar Barlie, ice hockey player
- 11 August – Stian Larsen, footballer
- 12 August – Espen Skistad, footballer
- 24 August – Christian Ruud, tennis player.
- 27 August – Espen Horsrud, footballer
- 30 August – Vegard Strøm, footballer

=== September ===
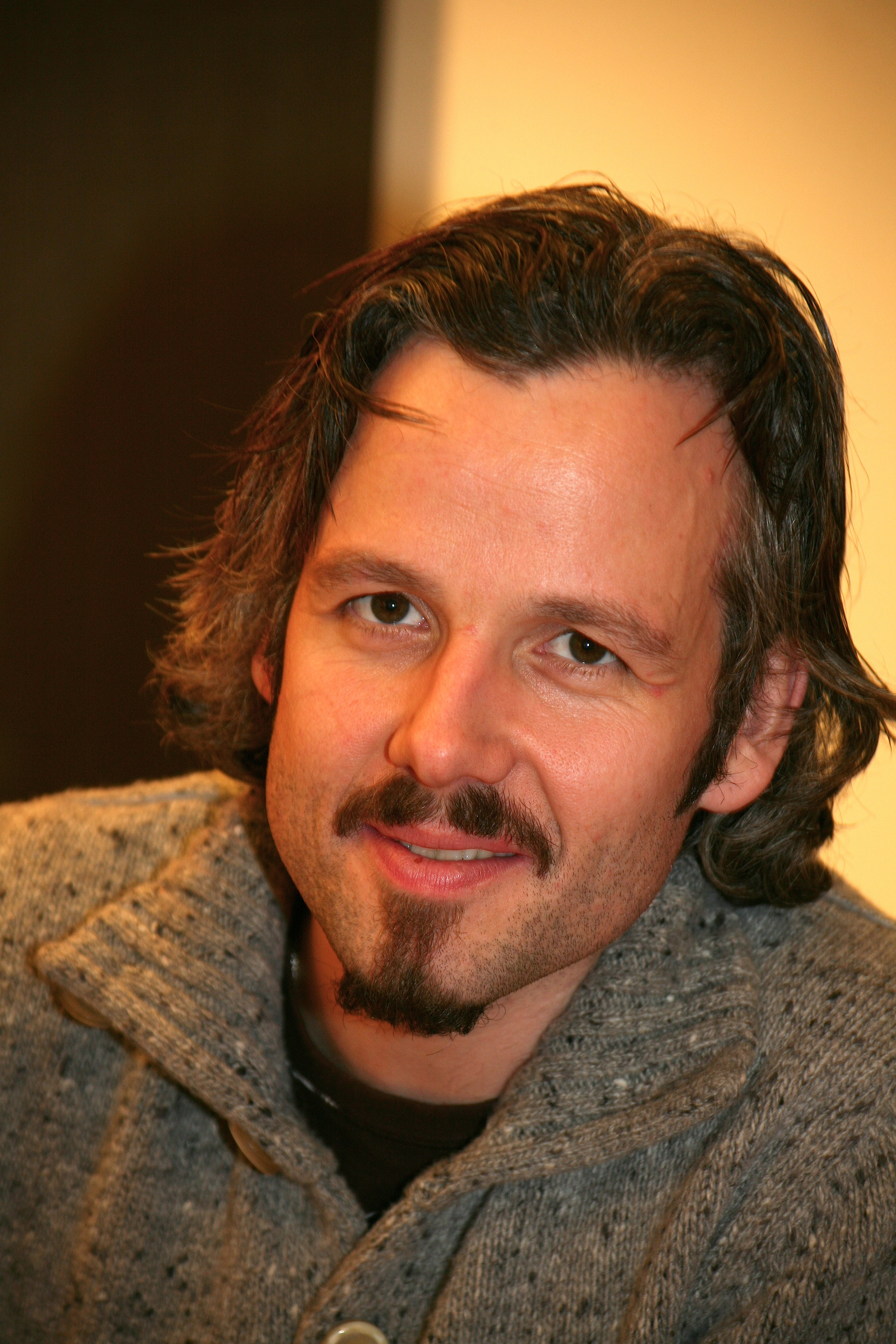
Ari Behn

- 10 September – Bente Skari, cross-country skier.
- 19 September – Kristoffer Joner, actor
- 20 September – Glenn Arne Hansen, footballer
- 28 September – Anne and Nina Nymark Andersen, footballers.
- 30 September – Ari Behn, author (died 2019)

=== October ===
- 8 October – Lars Joachim Grimstad, footballer and author
- 16 October – Tommy Bergersen, footballer
- 30 October – Gro Espeseth, footballer.

=== November ===
- 5 November – Thomas Frigård, footballer
- 6 November – Sveinung Stensland, politician.
- 16 November
  - Ingunn Bollerud, cyclist.
  - Karianne Eikeland, sailor.
- 23 November – Alf-Inge Haaland, footballer.
- 27 November – Thormod Ness, footballer
- 28 November – Cato André Hansen, footballer and manager
- 29 November – Hege Haukeland Liadal, politician.

=== December ===
- 2 December – Trond Fausa Aurvåg, actor.
- 9 December – Dagfinn Enerly, footballer
- 13 December – Jonny Hanssen, footballer and manager
- 16 December – Geir-Asbjørn Jørgensen, politician.
- 17 December – Alfred Bjørlo, politician.
- 18 December – Trine Strand, sport wrestler.

== Notable deaths ==
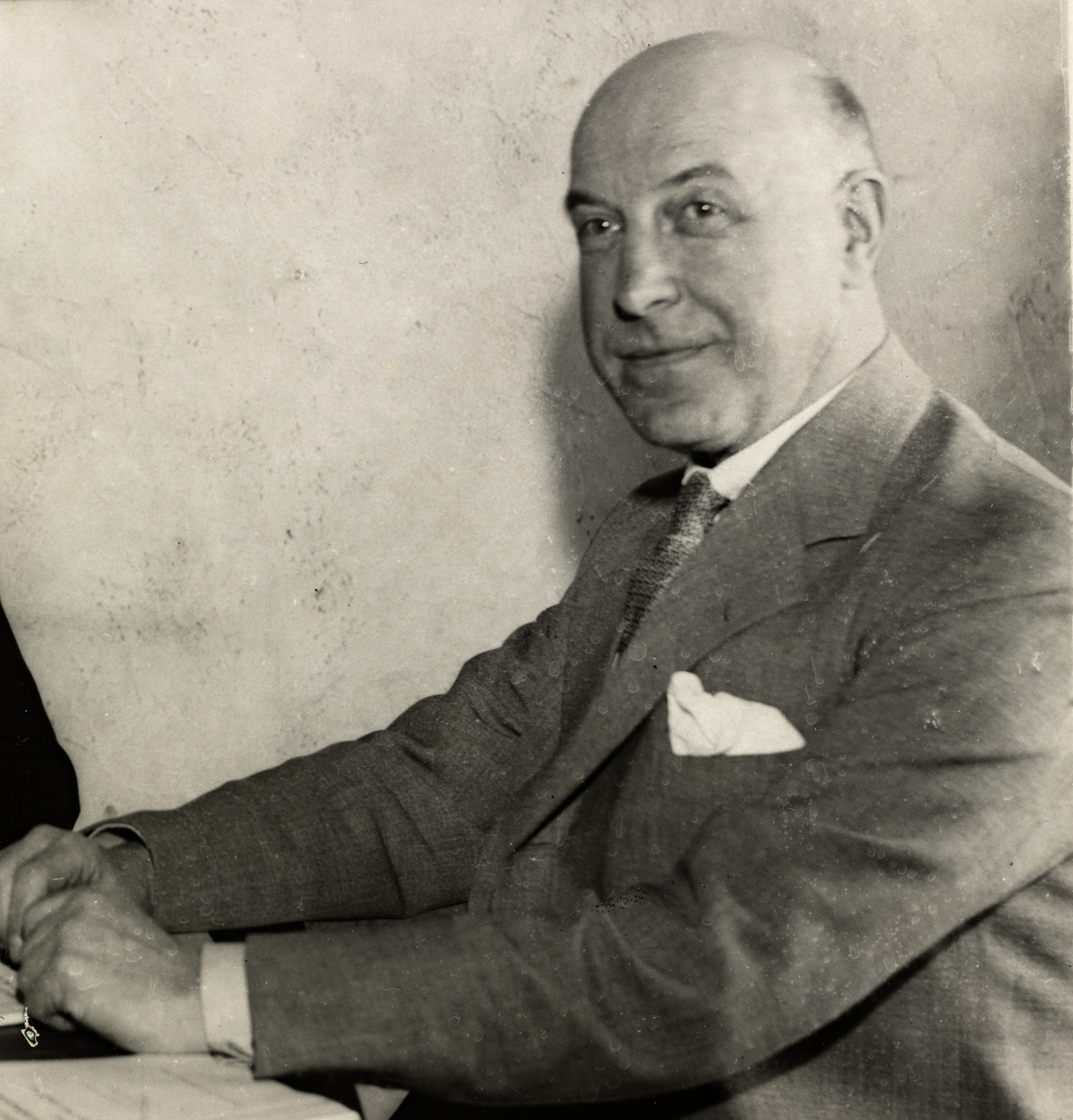
Arne Kildal

- 5 January – Olav Midttun, philologist, media executive and magazine editor (born 1883).
- 6 January – Hans Mikal Solsem, politician (b.1912)
- 2 February – Einar Staff, wholesaler (born 1889).
- 3 February – Sverre Grøner, gymnast and Olympic silver medallist (b.1890)
- 3 March – Oskar Slaaen, politician (b.1907)
- 29 March – Reidar Magnus Aamo, politician (b.1898)
- 4 April – Haldis Tjernsberg, politician (b.1903)
- 7 April – Mons Arntsen Løvset, politician (b.1891)
- 11 April – Reidar Ødegaard, cross country skier and Olympic bronze medallist (b.1901)
- 22 April –
  - Isak Abrahamsen, gymnast and Olympic gold medallist (b.1891)
  - Arne Espeland, writer (b. 1885)
- 18 May – Gunnar Thoresen, bobsledder (b.1921)
- 7 June – Bjarne Eilif Thorvik, politician (b.1908)
- 13 June – Per Severin Hjermann, politician (b.1891)
- 16 July – Knut Severin Jakobsen Vik, politician (b.1892)
- 17 July – Oscar Engelstad, gymnast and Olympic bronze medallist (b.1882)
- 30 July – Arne Sunde, politician, Olympic shooter, army officer and diplomat (b.1883)
- 1 September – Tor Lund, gymnast and Olympic gold medallist (b.1888)
- 6 September – Terje Wold, judge, politician and Minister (b.1899)
- 14 September – Oddmund Myklebust, politician and Minister (b.1915)
- 15 September – Erik Hesselberg, sailor and crew member on the Kon-Tiki expedition (b. 1914)
- 18 September – Gunvald Engelstad, politician (b.1900)
- 22 September – Olaf Solumsmoen, newspaper editor and politician (b.1896)
- 26 September – Carl Bonnevie, jurist and politician (born 1881).
- 28 September – Ole Bae, civil servant (b.1902)
- 29 September – Nils Ebbessøn Astrup, ship owner (born 1901).
- 8 October – Karl Johan Fjermeros, politician (b.1885)
- 11 October – Nils Fixdal, athlete (b.1889)
- 17 October – Alf Gowart Olsen, shipowner (born 1912).
- 19 October – Jacob Christie Kielland, architect (b.1897)
- October – Reidar Rye Haugan, newspaper publisher in America (b.1893)
- 11 November – Guri Johannessen, politician (b.1911)
- 1 December – Harald Houge Torp, politician (b.1890)
- 7 December – Arne Kildal, librarian and civil servant (b.1885)
- 12 December – Rasmus Birkeland, sailor and Olympic gold medallist (b.1888).

=== Full date unknown ===
- Petter Martinsen, gymnast and Olympic gold medallist (b.1887)
- Gunnar Schjelderup, businessperson (b.1895)
- Jon Sundby, politician and Minister (b.1883)
- Helge Thiis, architect and art critic (b.1897)
- Jørgen Vogt, newspaper editor and politician (b.1900)
