= 1912 in Norway =

- Centuries: 18th; 19th; 20th; 21st
- Decades: 1890s; 1900s; 1910s; 1920s; 1930s
- See also: List of years in Norway

Events in the year 1912 in Norway.

== Incumbents ==
- Monarch – Haakon VII.
- Prime Minister – Wollert Konow until 20 February; then Jens Bratlie

== Events ==
- 7 March – Roald Amundsen announced his success in reaching the South Pole
- 26 July – Elise Sem was authorized as the first female barrister in Norway
- Norsk Hydro established artificial fertilizer production at Glomfjord in Nordland. This activity is today Yara International.
- The 1912 Parliamentary election took place.

== Popular culture ==
=== Literature ===
- The Knut Hamsund novel Den sidste Glæde (The Last Joy, also known as Look Back in Happiness), was published.
- The Olav Duun novel Hilderøya (Hilder Island), Storbåten, was published.

== Births ==
- 5 January – Karstein Seland, politician (died 2005)
- 6 January – Thorleif Lintrup Paus, lawyer and diplomat (died 2006)
- 27 January – Arne Næss, philosopher (died 2009).
- 27 January – Lars Holen, politician (died 1994)
- 4 February – Ola Skjåk Bræk, banker, politician and Minister (died 1999)
- 14 February – Thorvald Wilhelmsen, long-distance runner (died 1996)
- 14 February – Sigurd Evensmo, author and journalist (died 1978).
- 17 February – Hans Mikal Solsem, politician (died 1972)
- 2 April – Eva Haalke, ballet teacher and dancer (died 2003).
- 8 April – Sonja Henie, figure skater, three time Olympic gold medallist, World Champion and actress (died 1969).
- 10 April – Sally Olsen, social worker (died 2006).
- 14 April – Arne Brustad, international soccer player and Olympic bronze medallist (died 1987).
- 15 April – Henry Karlsen, politician (died 1975)
- 20 April – Johan A. Vikan, politician (died 1997)
- 28 April – Øivind Holmsen, international soccer player and Olympic bronze medallist (died 1996).
- 9 May – Per Imerslund, politician, soldier and writer (died 1943)
- 19 May – Jens Gunderssen, singer, songwriter, actor, stage producer and theatre director (died 1969).
- 30 June – Alf Gowart Olsen, shipowner (died 1972).
- 3 July – Kaare Wahlberg, ski jumper and Olympic bronze medallist (died 1988)
- 4 July – Sverre Heiberg, photographer (died 1991).
- 12 July – Eugen Haugland, triple jumper (died 1990)
- 30 July – Alf Tveten, sailor and Olympic silver medallist (died 1997).
- 20 August – Birger Hatlebakk, industrialist and politician (died 1997)
- 9 September – Sam Melberg, sports diver and sports instructor (died 1998).
- 14 September – Asbjørn Berg-Hansen, boxer (died 1998)
- 14 September – Johannes Seland, politician (died 1999)
- 14 September – John Systad, long-distance runner (died 1998)
- 17 September – David Sandved, architect (died 2001)
- 21 September – Ragnhild Butenschøn, sculptor (died 1992).
- 2 October – Bjarne Iversen, cross country skier and Olympic silver medallist (died 1999).
- 7 October – Trygve Owren, politician (died 1987)
- 12 October – Arne Arnardo, circus performer and owner (died 1995)
- 18 October – Anders Skauge, politician (died 2000)
- 19 October – Arne Arnardo, circus performer and owner (died 1995).
- 26 October – Birger Breivik, politician (died 1996)
- 10 November – Ove Skaug, engineer and civil servant (died 2005)
- 21 November – Magli Elster, poet (died 1993).
- 9 December – Rolf Wickstrøm, labour activist, executed (died 1941)
- 12 December – Egil Aarvik, politician (died 1990)
- 12 December – Thorbjørn Egner, playwright, songwriter and illustrator (died 1990)
- 12 December – Sverre Walter Rostoft, politician and Minister (died 2001)

=== Full date unknown ===
- Peter Bastiansen, businessperson and politician (died 1995)
- Olav Brunvand, newspaper editor and politician (died 1988)
- Hans Engen, journalist, diplomat and politician (died 1966)
- Gunvor Galtung Haavik, interpreter charged with espionage (died 1977)
- Kåre Jonsborg, painter and textile artist (died 1977)
- Harald Wergeland, physicist (died 1987)

== Notable deaths ==
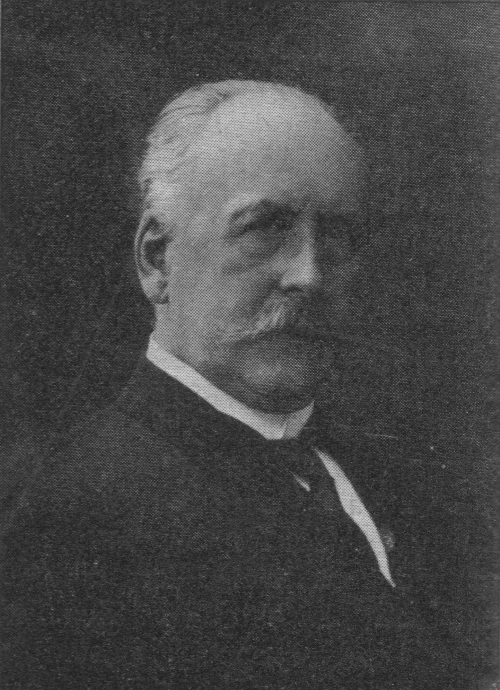
Ebbe Carsten Horneman Hertzberg

- 12 February – Gerhard Armauer Hansen, physician (born 1841)
- 4 July – Emil Stang, jurist, politician and Prime Minister of Norway (born 1834)
- 23 July – Haldor Boen, teacher and politician in America (born 1851)
- 1 August – Jens Jonas Jansen, priest (born 1844)
- 10 August – Jens Carl Peter Brandt, businessperson and politician (born 1848)
- 2 October – Ebbe Hertzberg, politician (born 1847).

=== Full date unknown ===
- Nils Hansteen, painter (born 1855)
- Lars Knutson Liestøl, politician and Minister (born 1839)
