= Adresseavisen =

Norwegian newspaper

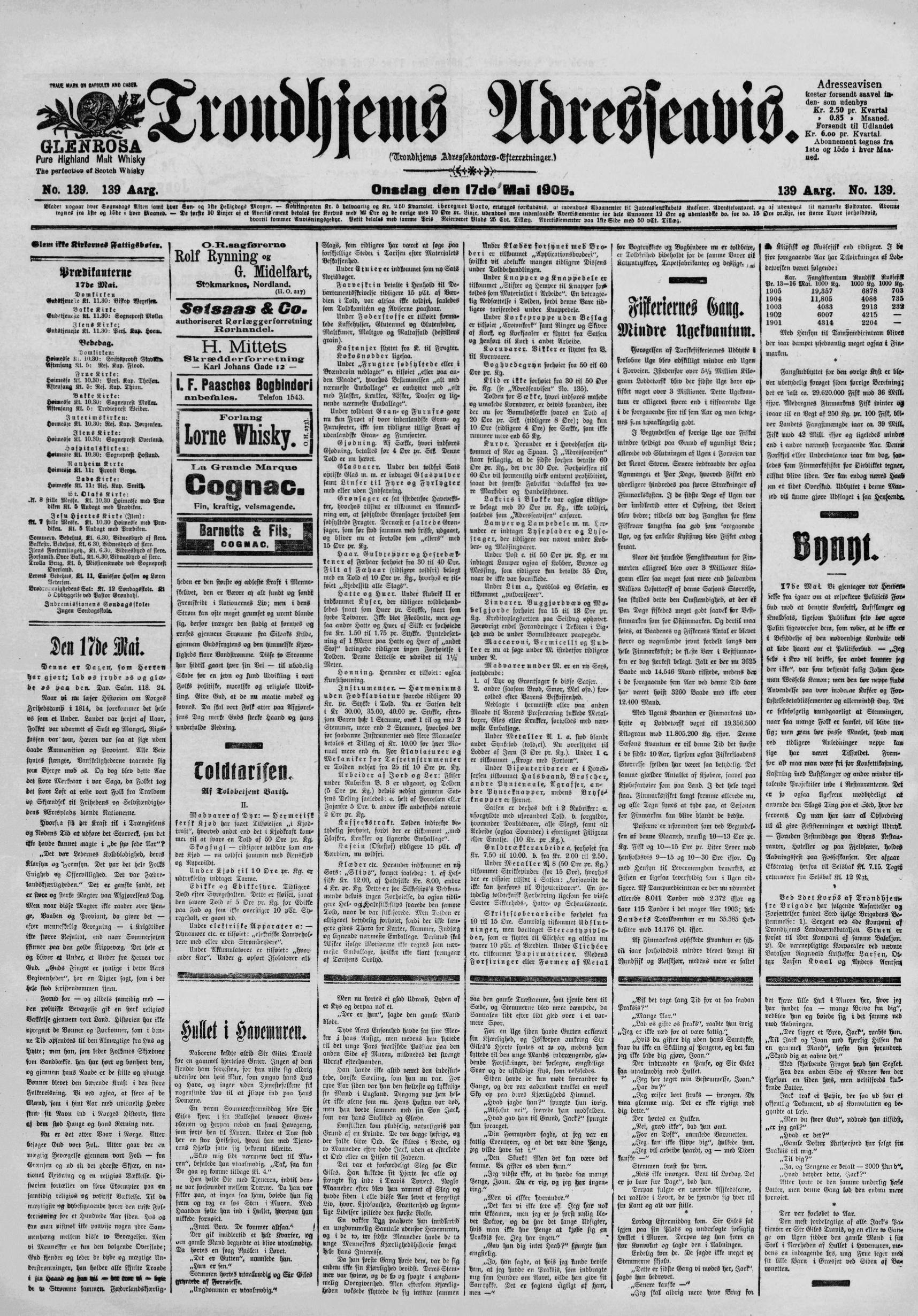
- The front page of Adresseavisen ("Trondhjems Adresseavis") dated 17 May 1905.
- Type: Daily newspaper
- Format: Tabloid
- Owner(s): Adresseavisen Media Group; Polaris Media; Schibsted ASA
- Editor: Kirsti Husby
- Founded: 3 July 1767; 259 years ago
- Language: Norwegian
- Headquarters: Trondheim, Norway
- Circulation: 78,000 (2024)
- Website: adressa.no

Adresseavisen (Urban East Norwegian: [ɑˈdrɛ̀sːəɑˌviːsn̩]; commonly known as Adressa) is a regional newspaper published daily, except Sundays, in Trondheim, Norway. The paper has been in circulation since 1767 and is one of the oldest newspapers in Norway after Norske Intelligenz-Seddeler which was launched in 1763.

Adresseavisen is owned by Polaris Media, in which Schibsted controls 29% of the shares.

== History and profile ==
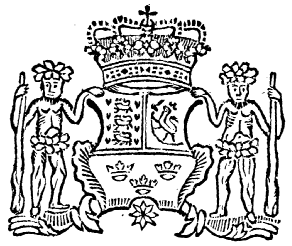
The Royal Coat of Arms on the header of the first page of the first issue, published on 3 July 1767.

The newspaper was first published on 3 July 1767 as Kongelig allene privilegerede Trondheims Adresse-Contoirs Efterretninger, making it the oldest Norwegian newspaper still being published. The paper was founded as a classified advertising publication. The name of the newspaper was changed several times before its present name began to be used in 1927. Locally it is often referred to as Adressa. The newspaper is based in Trondheim and covers the areas of Trøndelag and Nordmøre.

Martinus Lind Nissen (1744–1795) was the founder and first editor of Adresseavisen. At his death, Nissen was succeeded by Mathias Conrad Peterson, a French-oriented revolutionary pioneering radical journalism in Norway. Later editors, however, have been more conservative. In Peterson's age the paper was renamed Trondhjemske Tidender (roughly Trondhjem Times) and began to look more like a modern newspaper. Changing names, owners and profile several times during the 19th century, the paper was named Trondhjems Adresseavis in 1890. Its first press picture was published in 1893. During the 1920s, the paper was nearly bankrupted, but it was saved by the new editor, Harald Houge Torp, who held the position from 1927 to 1941, and then from 1945 until 1969.

In 1941, during the German occupation of Norway, the occupiers took control of the paper. The editorial leadership was dismissed and some were arrested. Jacob Skylstad, a member of the Norwegian Nazi party, Nasjonal Samling, was appointed as chief editor. Under Nazi leadership the paper was published until the liberation of Norway in May 1945. During this period the paper was considered "less bad" than Dagsposten which was the official Nasjonal Samling publication in Trondheim. At the end of the war the dismissed editorial leadership was reappointed.

Adresseavisen describes itself as conservative and is part of the Adresseavisen Media Group which owns several smaller local newspapers in the Trøndelag region. It also owns and operates a local radio station, Radio-Adressa, and a local TV station, TV-Adressa (prior to 30 January 2006: TVTrøndelag). In addition, the company owns the local newspapers Fosna-Folket, Hitra-Frøya, Levanger-Avisa, Sør-Trøndelag, Trønderbladet and Verdalingen. As of 2006 Schibsted had a share of the paper (31.7%). Stocks in Adresseavisen are traded on the Oslo Stock Exchange.

Adressavisen became the first Norwegian newspaper to use computer technology in 1967. Its website was launched in 1996. Gunnar Flikke was editor-in-chief from 1989 to 2006. Adresseavisen switched from broadsheet to tabloid format on 16 September 2006.

== Circulation ==
Adresseavisen sold 87,000 copies in 2003, 79,789 in 2007 and 61,086 in 2014. In the first half of 2024 Addresseavisen had an average circulation of 78,000 (rounded to the closest thousand). Note that from 2020 the circulation numbers includes both paper copies and digital subscriptions.

The online newspaper Adressa.no had an average of 155,000 daily readers in 2015. In October 2024 Adressa.no had a weekly average of 148,838 unique visitors. The paper had across its paper and digital editions during the second quarter of 2024 an estimated total of 191,796 daily readers.

== Notable chief editors ==
- Martinus Nissen (1767–1795)
- Matthias Conrad Peterson (1795–1800)
- Harald Torp (1927 – 1941, 1945 – 1969)
- Jacob Skylstad (1941–1945)
- Andreas Norland (1975–1977)
- Kjell Einar Amdahl (1977–1996)
- Gunnar Flikke (1989–2006)
- Arne Blix (2007–2015)
- Tor Olav Mørseth (2015–2017)
- Kirsti Husby (2017 – incumbent)

== See also ==
- List of oldest companies
