= Framtid i Nord =

Local newspaper in northern Troms county, Norway

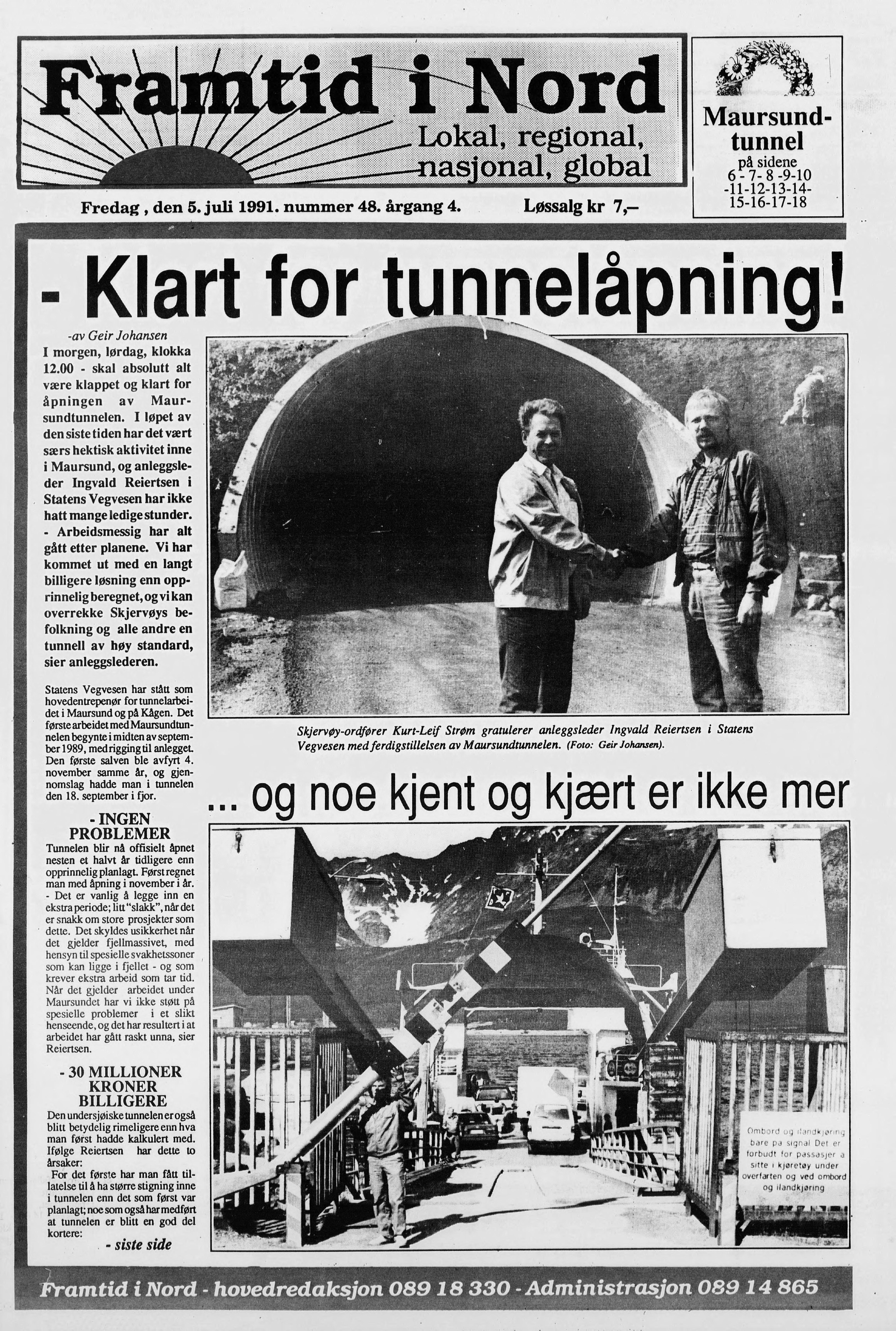
Front page in 1991

Framtid i Nord (English: Future in the North) is a local newspaper in northern Troms county, in Northern Norway. It focuses on local news from the municipalities of Kvænangen, Nordreisa, Lyngen, Skjervøy, Gáivuotna, and Storfjord. It is published three days a week and has a circulation of 5,294, of whom 4,413 are subscribers. The editor is Kjetil Martesønn Skog.

The newspaper is based in Nordreisa, and claims to be the only newspaper published from within the Arctic Circle. It is published by the company Framtid i nord avisdrift AS, which is in turn owned by Polaris Media (58.6%), Bladet Tromsø (21.0%), and Troms Folkeblad (20.4%).
