= Byavisa =

Former Norwegian newspaper

Byavisa (lit. 'The Town Gazette') was a free newspaper published in Trondheim, Norway from 1996 to 2016. It was distributed to all households in Trondheim Municipality as well as the central part of the neighboring Melhus Municipality. The paper was issued every Wednesday. The newspaper was discontinued due to a long-term operating deficit. The last issue was released on May 25, 2016.

== History ==
Byavisa was established by former employees of Avisa Trondheim when that paper went bankrupt in February 1996. The first issue was released in May 1996.

Byavisa was purchased by the company Norsk Avisdrift in 1998. Denmark's Søndagsavisen and later A-pressen joined as owners in 1999, replacing among others former pornographic magazine founder Sten Ture Jensen as owners. In 2001, A-pressen completely sold its share to the Danish company.

In addition to Byavisa, the company Norsk Avisdrift published four other free newspapers in Oslo and Akershus. In 2002 all of these newspapers were discontinued, including Osloposten, which was costing its owners NOK 100 million alone. However, Byavisa was allowed to continue.

In 2003 the newspaper started to publish Byens Næringsliv (City Business Life). In November 2005 a sister publication was established in Stjørdal Municipality and the surrounding area called Byavisa Stjørdal (lit. 'The Stjørdal Town Gazette'). Byavisa Stjørdal was discontinued after one year of operation.

In 2008, the paper's Danish owners sold Byavisa and its publishing company Norsk Avisdrift to the company NR1 Adressa-trykk Orkanger, which is owned by A-Media AS (Nr1trykk AS) (50%) and Polaris trykk Trondheim AS (50%), which are affiliates of Amedia and Polaris Media.

Byavisa had a print run of approximately 73,000 copies in Trondheim and central parts of the municipality of Melhus. The newspaper was distributed by Adressa Distribusjon AS. Karina Lein was the editor until June 1, 2016, and Erlend Rogstad was the paper's manager until May 31, 2016. The newspaper was officially discontinued on June 1, 2016.
