= Linda Johansen =

Norwegian model and contributing editor

- Born: 1967 (age 57–58); Ski, Norway
- Occupation(s): Businesswoman, model, softcore pornography editor

Linda Johansen (born 1967) is a Norwegian businesswoman, former glamour model, and former editor of the softcore pornographic magazine Lek.

Johansen was born in Ski, Norway. She became the editor of Lek in 1993. At the same time, she was also the editor of the magazines Det nye Cocktail and Kontakt Forum. The magazines were a financial success, not least of all due to her as an eye-catcher. In 1989, Johansen appeared on the covers of the American magazine Penthouse and the Norwegian Alle Menn. In the 1990s, she was often referred to as "Lek-Linda" because of her association with the magazine. She resigned as editor of the magazines in 1998 and also stopped modeling.

Johansen has also worked in music, and she recorded a new version of the old hit song "Hands Up" with the group Hype, for which she was a vocalist in the mid-1990s. She also appeared in an episode of the situation comedy Mot i brøstet.

Since the beginning of the 2000s, Johansen has operated two beauty salons: Beauty Lounge and Beauty Express. For the first five years they officially operated at a loss, but in 2006 they made a profit for the first time. In 2008, the newspaper NA24 reported that outlets had shown a solid profit in 2007. In the late 1990s she ran the nightclubs Gozzip and Gallery in Oslo, together with her partner at the time, Bjørn Løvstad.

== Autobiography ==
In 2004 Johansen published her autobiography For alles øyne (For Everyone's Eyes), which deals with her life in the pornography industry. In the book, she states that she has come to terms with her past as a softcore pornography model. The book reveals, among other things, that she had a romance with Hollywood star Charlie Sheen in the early 1990s. She also writes about being raped while in the Mediterranean at age 20. On the talk show Først & sist on March 5, 2004, the lawyer Tor Erling Staff (the two of them were guests together on the show) revealed that he had been asked to block her upcoming autobiography.

== Other ==
Johansen created a stir in the media when she acquired a Bengal cat in 1997, which she named Lady Cheeba. The cat also appeared in the episode of the situation comedy Mot i brøstet that she had a guest appearance in. Shortly thereafter, she acquired two additional cats.

== Guest appearances on TV ==
- Først & sist (NRK1, 2004)
- Stol aldri på en kjendis (TV2, 1998)
- Komplottet (TV3, 1997)
- Mot i brøstet (TV2, 1997, in the episode "I full strekk")
- Nåde den som tror (TV2, 1996)
