= Innherred (newspaper) =

Norwegian newspaper

- Type: Newspaper
- Format: Tabloid
- Owner: Polaris Media
- Publisher: Mediahuset Innherred AS
- Founded: 30 May 2015; 11 years ago
- Language: Norwegian
- Headquarters: Verdalsøra
- City: Verdal
- Country: Norway
- Circulation: 9213 (as of 2023)
- Website: innherred.no

Innherred is an online and printed local newspaper covering Levanger Municipality and Verdal Municipality in Trøndelag, Norway. It has two editorial locations, in Verdalsøra and the town of Levanger. It is majority-owned by Polaris Media and published by Mediahuset Innherred AS. The newspaper had its first edition on 30 May 2015. It was created as a merger between Levanger-Avisa and Innherreds Folkeblad og Verdalingen.

== History ==
Levanger-Avisa was founded as Nodre Trondhjems Amtstidende in 1848 and covered Levanger Municipality. Innherreds Folkeblad og Verdalingen was created in 1952 through the merger of Innherreds Folkeblad (founded in 1900) and Verdalingen (founded in 1945) and covered Verdal Municipality. Both Levanger-Avisa and Innherreds Folkeblad og Verdalingen were of similar size and scope, with about four thousand subscribers, similar revenue of 15 million kroner and three weekly printed editions, and both majority-owned by Polaris Media.

Work on the merger began in 2014. Both newspapers were struggling financially, and both were considering scaling down production to save costs. Instead, they decided to combine their operations and geographic scope. Innherred received its first issue on 30 May 2015. Former Levanger-Avisa editor Roger Rein was the newspaper's inaugural editor-in-chief. The new newspaper received two editorial offices, one in each of the town centers, Verdalsøra and Levanger, in an attempt at a joint publishing location. The operating company Mediahuset Innherred is incorporated in Verdal.

The merger resulted in combined increase in circulation with 900 subscribers immediately after its launch. From 2016 it introduced paywalled content. It had a circulation of 6967 in 2016 and 9213 in 2023. Espen Leirset replaced Rein as editor-in-chief in December 2021.
