= Sten Ture Jensen =

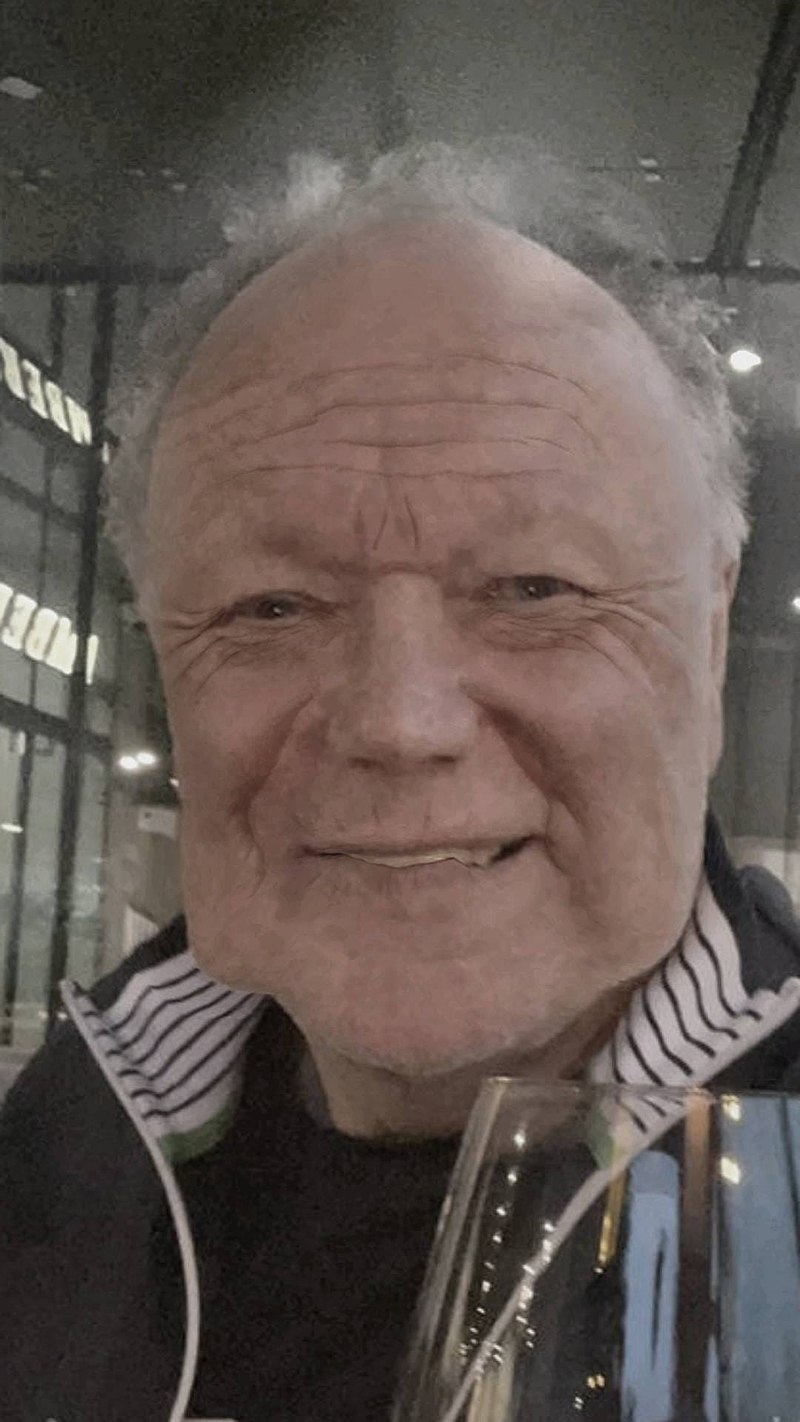
Sten Ture Jensen, 2021

Sten Ture Jensen (born April 29, 1956) is a Norwegian editor and investor, originally from Alsvåg in Øksnes Municipality and living in Oslo.

In 1976, at the age of 20, he was appointed by magazine-owner Leif Hagen to become the editor of Norway's first pornographic magazine, Aktuell Rapport. He was the editor of Alle Menn from 1979 to 1984. He was later involved in publishing the softcore pornographic magazines Lek and Cocktail.

Jensen was one of the creators of the company Media Holding, which was listed on the stock exchanged in 1997. Media Holding created a stock market bubble, earning the founders, including Jensen, large amounts of money. The company was declared bankrupt in 1999 but reemerged in 2000, when it turned out that there was still value left in it. Since then, Jensen has worked as a property investor in Thailand. He has also established a legal and auditing firm in Myanmar.
