= Fjordenes Tidende =

Norwegian newspaper

Logo.

Fjordenes Tidende is a Norwegian newspaper published two times a week in Måløy in Vestland county.

== History and profile ==
Fjordenes Tidende started on 5 April 1910 as the Liberal Left Party organ in the region Nordfjord. Måløy, where it was based, had become a mercantile hub. In 1931 the Conservative Party took over, before it was sold to Sunnmørsposten in 1994. The paper is published by a company owned by Polaris Media.

Fjordenes Tidende is published three days a week, Monday, Wednesday and Friday, and the circulation was 4 518 copies in 2014.
