= Thormod =

Thormod is a masculine given name. Notable people with the name include:

- Thormod Næs (1930–1997), Norwegian sport shooter
- Thormod Ness (born 1972), Norwegian footballer and coach
