= Espeland (surname) =

Espeland is a Norwegian surname. Notable people with the surname include:

- Arne Espeland (1885–1972), Norwegian writer
- Stefan Espeland (born 1989), Norwegian ice hockey player
- Velle Espeland (1945–2024), Norwegian folklorist

== See also ==
- Espeland Falls
