= Gunnerud =

Gunnerud is a surname. Notable people with the surname include:

- Arne Vinje Gunnerud (1930–2007), Norwegian sculptor
- Jon Arne Gunnerud, Norwegian handball player
- Jørgen Gunnerud (1948–2025), Norwegian crime fiction writer
- Sverre M. Gunnerud (born 1948), Norwegian television presenter
