= Arne Blix =

Norwegian journalist

Arne Blix (born 20 September 1954) is a Norwegian journalist.

Since 2006 he is the editor-in-chief of the newspaper Adresseavisen. Starting his career as a journalist in Bladet Tromsø from 1976 to 1978 and in Verdens Gang from 1978 to 1985, he has worked in Adresseavisen since, except for the years 1987 to 1989. He took the cand.jur. degree at the University of Oslo in 1986.

Media offices
Preceded by Gunnar Flikke	Chief editor of Adresseavisen; 2006–2015	Succeeded by Tor Olav Mørseth
