= Thorgils =

Thorgils, Torgils, Þorgils, Torgil or Thorgil is a Nordic masculine given name that may refer to

- Þorgils gjallandi (1851–1915), Icelandic author
- Þorgils Mathiesen (born 1962), Icelandic handball player
- Thorgils Skarthi, 10th century Viking leader and poet
- Thorgil Sprakling, 10th century Danish chieftain
- Torgils Orrabeinfostre, legendary Norse hero
- Torgils Lovra, Norwegian editor
- Torgil Øwre Gjertsen (born 1992), Norwegian football player
- Torgil Thorén (1892–1982), Swedish military officer
- Torgil von Seth (1895–1989), Swedish politician
- Torgils Knutsson (?–1306), Swedish nobleman
