= Skauge =

Skauge is a Norwegian surname. Notable people with the surname include:

- Anders Skauge (1912–2000), Norwegian politician
- Arne Skauge (born 1948), Norwegian politician
- Hallvard Skauge (born 1945), Norwegian illustrator

== See also ==
- Skaug
