= Skaug =

Skaug is a surname. Notable people with the surname include:

- Arne Skaug (1906–1974), Norwegian economist, civil servant, diplomat and politician
- Gunnar Skaug (1940–2006) was a Norwegian politician
- Morten Skaug, Norwegian curler and curling coach
- Ove Skaug (1912–2005), Norwegian engineer and civil servant

== See also ==
- Skauge
