= Alf Olsen =

Alf Olsen may refer to:

- Alf Olsen (footballer) (1893–1976), Danish amateur football player
- Alf Olsen (gymnast) (1925–2001), Norwegian gymnast
- Alf Gowart Olsen (1912–1972), Norwegian ship owner and ship broker
