= Sunnmørsposten =

Norwegian newspaper

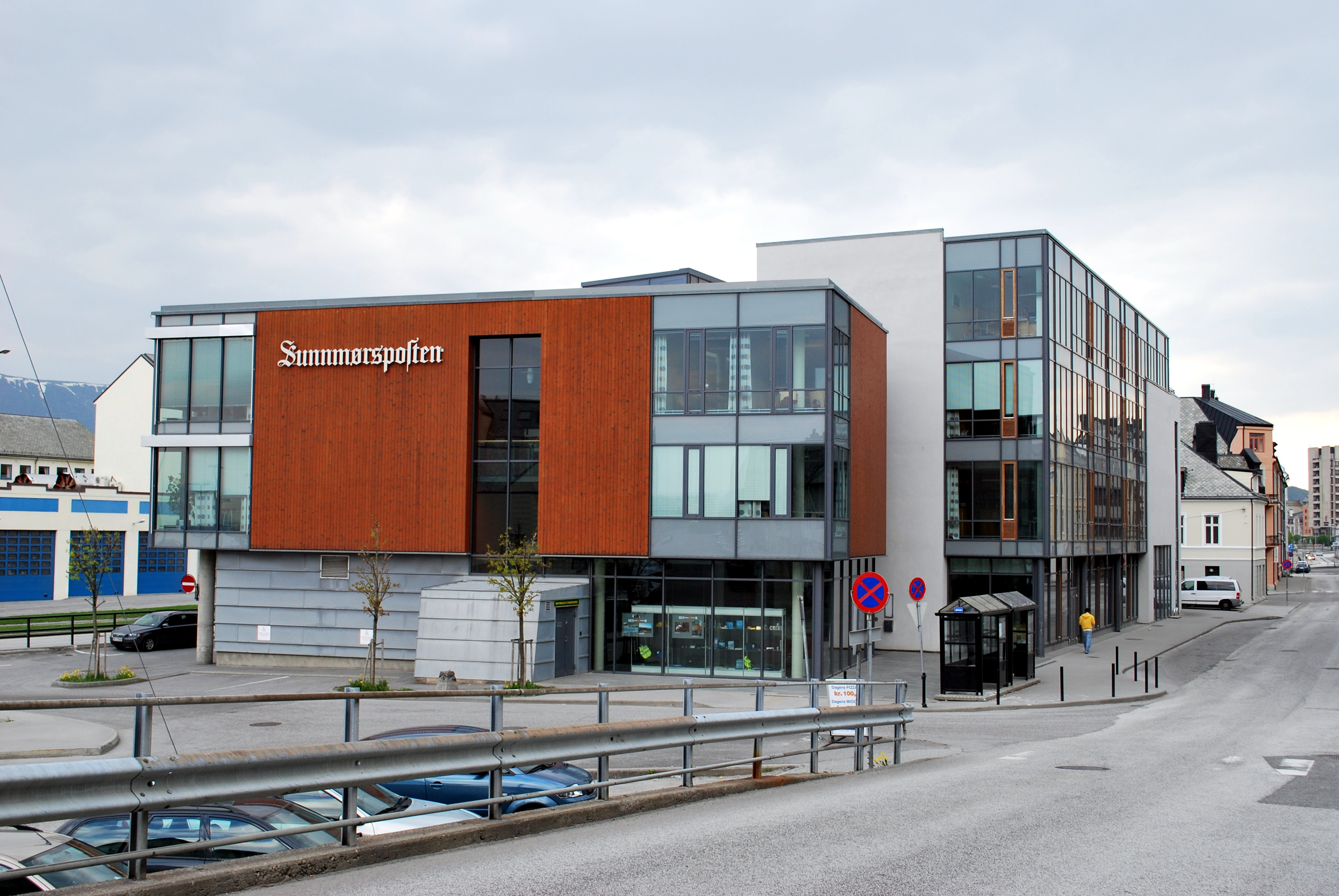
- Type: Daily (Monday through Saturday) newspaper
- Format: Tabloid from May 2006
- Owner: Polaris Media
- Editor: Hanna Lovise Relling Berg
- Founded: 1882
- Headquarters: Ålesund, Norway
- Price: NOK 15,-
- Website: www.smp.no

Sunnmørsposten (Urban East Norwegian: [ˈsʉ̂nːmøːʂˌpɔsːtn̩]) is a newspaper published by Polaris Media in Ålesund, Norway.

== History and profile ==
In its early days, Sunnmørsposten competed with several other local newspapers, including Aalesunds Avis (1917–1957), Aalesunds blad (1871–1895), Aalesunds Handels- og Sjøfartstidende (1857–1904), Aalesunds Socialdemokrat (1908–1910), and Arbeidernes blad (1898).

Until May 2006 Sunnmørsposten was published in broadsheet format. At the time of its transition to compact format, it was one of the last newspapers in Norway to be published in broadsheet. Published in compact format (tabloid) six days a week, the paper consists of two sections; one for local news, sports and classified ads, and one for culture, weather, opinions and editorials and obituaries. On Saturdays they print a third weekend-section.

Mecom owned Sunnmorsposten until February 2009 when it was sold to the Polaris Media.

In 2012 Sunnmorsposten launched a project in datajournalism.
