= Mat fra Norge =

Norwegian food and drink magazine

Mat fra Norge (Food from Norway) is a magazine with articles about Norwegian food and drink published by Aftenposten.

The first issue of the magazine was published in the fall of 2011 in a print run of 45,000 copies. In February 2014 the magazine was the country's most widely read food magazine, with 101,000 readers. Mat fra Norge is published eight times a year and is available through newsstand sale or subscription. Typical material includes contributions by local producers, restaurant reviews, articles about raw materials, product news, tests, and cultural history articles.

The magazine's editor is Per A. Borglund.
