= NA24 =

Norwegian business newspaper

- Type: Online business newspaper
- Format: Online
- Owner(s): TV2 Group; Aller Internett
- Founded: 22 March 2006
- Language: Norwegian
- Headquarters: Norway
- Country: Norway
- Website: na24.no

Næringslivsavisen NA24.no AS or NA24 is a Norwegian online business newspaper. It was created on 22 March 2006 as a merger between the business sections of Nettavisen, Fædrelandsvennen, Stavanger Aftenblad, Bergens Tidende and Adresseavisen, and the online newspapers iMarkedet and Propaganda. It has 400,000 weekly users, and editor-in-chief is Inge Berge. It is owned 40% by the TV2 Group, 20% by Aller Internett and 10% by each the four participating regional newspapers.
