= Tor Olav Mørseth =

Norwegian newspaper editor and business executive

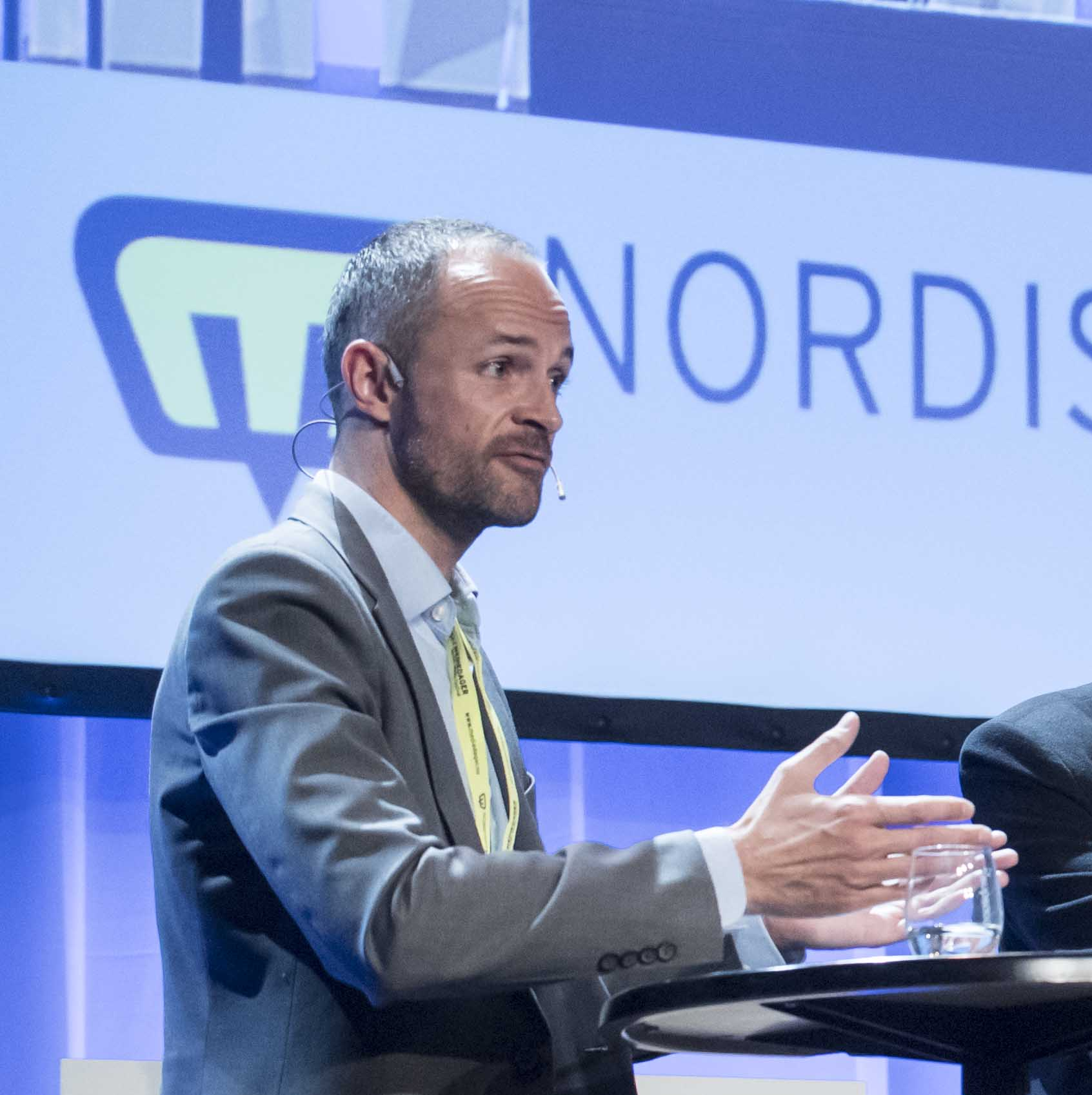
- Born: 30 July 1980 (age 45); Stjørdal Municipality, Norway
- Education: Economist
- Alma mater: Norwegian School of Economics; Copenhagen Business School
- Occupations: Business executive and former newspaper editor

Tor Olav Mørseth (born 30 July 1980) is a Norwegian business executive and former newspaper editor. He has worked as journalist, development editor and product manager for Bergens Tidende, was chief editor of the newspaper Adresseavisen from 2015 to 2017, and has been manager for Snøhetta since 2020.

== Biography ==
Born in Stjørdal Municipality on 30 July 1980, Mørseth studied economy at the Norwegian School of Economics, and at the Copenhagen Business School.

He was assigned to the newspaper Bergens Tidende from 2001 to 2015, first as journalist and later news editor, development editor, and product manager. From 2015 to 2017 he was chief editor of the newspaper Adresseavisen, and then CEO of the company Digital Norway. From 2020 he was appointed director of the Oslo department of the architectural company Snøhetta.

Media offices
Preceded by Arne Blix	Chief editor of Adresseavisen; 2015–2017	Succeeded by Kirsti Husby
