= Møre-Nytt =

Local newspaper in Norway

- Type: Local newspaper
- Owner(s): Polaris Media
- Founder(s): Alf and Øivind Bergmann
- Founded: 1935; 90 years ago
- Language: Norwegian
- Headquarters: Ørsta
- Website: Møre-Nytt

Møre-Nytt is a local newspaper published in Ørsta, Norway, which has been in circulation since 1935.

== Profile ==
Møre-Nytt was established by Alf and Øivind Bergmann in 1935. The paper was published three times a week, but now it appears two times per week. It is based in Ørsta and serves Ørsta Municipality and Volda Municipality. Its website was closed in November 2012.

The Bergman family was the owner of Møre-Nytt until 2007 when its majority share was acquired by the Sunnmørsposten, a subsidiary of the Edda Media. The paper was sold to its current owner, Polaris Media, in 2009.

In 2011 Møre-Nytt introduced digital user payment.

Møre-Nytt sold 5,526 copies in 2008. The circulation of the paper was 5,214 copies in 2013.

== See also ==
- List of newspapers in Norway
