= Gunnar Flikke =

Norwegian newspaper editor

Gunnar Flicke
- Born: November 3, 1947 (age 77)

Gunnar Flikke (born 3 November 1947) is a Norwegian newspaper editor.

He was born in Steinkjer. He was employed as a freelancer in Trønder-Avisa, Morgenavisen and the Norwegian Broadcasting Corporation, before being journalist and sub-editor in Adresseavisen from 1970 to 1971 and 1974 to 1988. He was editor-in-chief of Billedbladet Nå from 1988, then in Adresseavisen from 1989 to 2006.

He has been deputy chairman of the Association of Norwegian Editors. In 2010 he became a board member of the Norwegian Broadcasting Corporation.

Media offices
Preceded by Fridtjof M. Ålstedt	Chief editor of Adresseavisen; 1989–2006 (until 1997 jointly with Kjell Einar Amdahl)	Succeeded by Arne Blix
