= Stein-Erik Mattsson =

Stein-Erik Mattsson (born January 26, 1959) is a Norwegian lawyer, journalist, and comedian, and formerly the editor of Aktuell Rapport and chief editor of Alle Menn.

Mattsson was born in Oslo. He worked for a while as a lawyer and had many high-profile clients, such as Varg Vikernes. He was the chairman of the Oslo and Akershus District of Curling from 1989 to 2001 and the director of the Norwegian Curling Association from 1992 to 1995 and from 2001 to 2003. Mattsson served as chief editor of the pornographic magazine Alle Menn from 1994 to 1997, and then as the editor of Aktuell Rapport, Gullrapport, and Cats Magazine from 2000 to 2003.

Mattsson started the Censor-Bar Scandal (Norwegian: Pornosladd-saken) in the summer of 2002 when he handed out a free porn magazine without a censor bar in downtown Oslo and was prosecuted by the politician Lena Jensen. The result of this was that pornographic magazines and films no longer needed to be censored in Norway, and that porn movies can easily be imported and distributed.

Mattsson has also worked as a comedian. Among other appearances, he performed with the comedians Herodes Falsk and Tom Mathisen in their show at Oslo Spektrum in 2001.
