= Brønnøysunds Avis =

Norwegian newspaper

- Type: Local newspaper
- Format: Tabloid and online
- Founded: 1920; 106 years ago
- Language: Norwegian
- Headquarters: Brønnøysund
- Circulation: 3,874 (as of 2013)
- Website: banett.no

Brønnøysunds Avis is a local print and online newspaper published in Brønnøysund, Norway.

== History and profile ==
Brønnøysunds Avis was founded in 1920. The paper covers Brønnøy Municipality, the Helgeland region, and vicinity and is owned 69-percent by Polaris Media. It has five weekly issues, all days except Sundays and Mondays. It is published in tabloid format and was the first Norwegian newspaper to make an online edition, on 6 March 1995.

The circulation of Brønnøysunds Avis was 3,955 copies in 2012. The newspaper had a circulation of 3,874 copies in 2013.
