= Per A. Borglund =

Norwegian newspaper and magazine editor

Per A. Borglund (born June 30, 1961) is a Norwegian newspaper and magazine editor.

Borglund was born in Gjøvik. He worked for 12 years at the newspaper Verdens Gang and was also the editor-in-chief at Egmont Hjemmet Mortensen, an editor at Scandinavia Online, the editor-in-chief and administrative director of the free newspaper Avis 1, and the general manager and publishing editor for Aftenposten. Borglund is also the author of the 2007 book 100 år med kokebøker. Mat, mennesker og historie (One Hundred Years of Cookbooks. Food, People, and History) and was a food writer for the newspaper supplement A-magasinet. He is currently the editor of the magazine Mat fra Norge (Food from Norway).

Borglund owns Norway's largest collection of cookbooks, comprising over 5,000 volumes.
