= Sør-Trøndelag (newspaper) =

Newspaper in Trøndelag, Norway

- Type: Local
- Format: Tabloid and online
- Owner: Polaris Media
- Founded: 1908
- Language: Norwegian
- City: Orkanger
- Country: Norway
- Circulation: 6,805 (as of 2013)
- Website: avisa-st.no

Sør-Trøndelag is a local online and print newspaper published in Orkanger, Norway. It covers the municipalities of Orkland, Skaun, Heim, Rennebu, and Rindal. Published in tabloid format, the newspaper had a circulation of 6,805 in 2013. The newspaper is owned by Polaris Media. It has five weekly issues, on Mondays through Saturdays. The newspaper was founded in 1908 as Søndre Trondhjems Amtstidende.
