= Egil Ulateig =

Norwegian journalist and writer (1946–2026)

Egil Ulateig (March 16, 1946 – June 28, 2026) was a Norwegian journalist and non-fiction writer.

== Life and career ==
Ulateig served as the editor of the magazine Alle Menn in the 1970s. He also wrote for the newspaper Ny Tid, which at the time was owned by the Socialist Left Party. Ulateig had more than 20 years of experience as a journalist and traveled globally for his work. He also served in the Norwegian Peace Corps in eastern Africa.

He wrote many coffee table books and documentary books, including books on Norwegians that fought for the Axis powers during the Second World War. He also wrote biographies, such as Raud krigar, raud spion (Red Warrior, Red Spy) about the communist saboteur and resistance member Asbjørn Sunde. Ulateig specialized in the history of those Norwegians who fought for the Germans during the Second World War. He repeatedly sparked debates and headlines due to disclosures and/or statements he made in his books.

Ulateig lived in Lesja Municipality in Innlandet county, where he also ran the publishing company Forlaget Reportasje. He died on June 28, 2026, at the age of 80.

== Bibliography ==
- 1973: Øyekast i en fremmed gate (Glance in a Strange Street; Aschehoug)
- 1973: Den kvite mann i Kenya: kvifor vert dei fattige fattigare? (The White Man in Kenya: Why Are the Poor Becoming Poorer? Samlaget)
- 1975: Hvite herskere – svarte slaver (White Rulers—Black Slaves; Aschehoug)
- 1984: Falstad: en konsentrasjonsleir i Norge (Falstad: A Concentration Camp in Norway; Mortensens forlag)
- 1985: Hjem til Stalin: skjebnen til 83 000 russiske krigsfanger i Norge (Home to Stalin: The Fate of the 83,000 Russian Prisoners of War in Norway; Cappelen)
- 1986: En nordmann mot mafiaen (A Norwegian against the Mafia; Mortensens)
- 1987: Dagbok frå ein rotnorsk nazist (Diary of a Genuine Norwegian Patriot Nazi; Samlaget)
- 1987: To levende og to døde (Flukten) (Two Living and Two Dead: Escape; Metope)
- 1988: I hellig tjeneste: om Norge, Israel og fem kanonbåter (In Sacred Service: Norway, Israel, and Five Gunboats; Metope)
- 1989: Raud krigar, raud spion (Red Warrior, Red Spy; Samlaget)
- 1990: Den lange reisen hjem: kongefamilien under annen verdenskrig (The Long Journey Home: The Royal Family during the Second World War; Scanbok)
- 1991: Hvit hevn (White Vengeance; Scanbok)
- 1993: Justismord: Historien om Roald Dysthe (Miscarriage of Justice: The Story of Roald Dysthe; Aschehoug)
- 1996: Med rett til å drepe (Licence to Kill; Tiden)
- 1998: Heimevernets hjerte: Heimevernskolen Dombås 1948–1998 (Home Guard Heart: The Dombås Home Guard School 1948–1998; Skolen)
- 1999: De gode mot de onde... (Good against Evil ...; Forlaget Reportasje)
- 2001: Vergeløs: Historien om Marit Sjongs liv før og etter døden (Defenseless: The Story of Marit Sjong's Life before and after Death; Reportasje)
- 2002: Veien mot undergangen: Historien om de norske frontkjemperne (The Road to Doom: The Story of the Norwegians that Fought for the Germans; Reportasje)
- 2003: Korsfestelsen: Historien om Ragnvald Skrede og Vågå (Crucifixion: The Story of Ragnvald Skrede and Vågå; Reportasje)
- 2004: Fordømte engler: Norske kvinner på Østfronten (Condemned Angels: Norwegian Women on the Eastern Front; Reportasje)
- 2005: Nordmennene på Østfronten: Deres egen historie i bilder (The Norwegians on the Eastern Front: Their History in Pictures; Reportasje)
- 2006: Jakten på massemorderne (The Search for Mass Murderers; Reportasje)
- 2007: Stjerneskudd: Ola Plassen 1907–1930 (Shooting Star: Ola Plassen 1907–1930; Reportasje)
- 2008: I Jesu navn: Krigens siste offer (In the Name of Jesus: The War's Last Victim; Reportasje)
