= Polaris Media =

Norwegian media group

Polaris Media ASA
- Company type: Allmennaksjeselskap
- Traded as: OSE: POL
- Industry: Media
- Founded: 2008
- Headquarters: Trondheim, Norway
- Subsidiaries: Adresseavisen Gruppen; Harstad Tidende Gruppen; Polaris Media Nordvestlandet; Polaris Trykk
- Website: www.polarismedia.no

Polaris Media ASA is a media group which owns thirty newspapers in Norway. Based in Trondheim, the group was established in 2008. Major newspapers owned by the group include Adresseavisen, Harstad Tidende, Troms Folkeblad, Sunnmørsposten and Romsdals Budstikke. The company is listed on the Oslo Stock Exchange.

== Business units ==
=== PNV Media ===
Stampen Group (GP, TTELA, Hallandsposten, Hallands Nyheter, Bohusläningen, StrömstadsTidning, Alingsås Tidning, Kungsbacka-Posten, Kungälvs-Posten, Lokaltidningen STO, Mölndals-Posten and Free news papers: Alingsås Kuriren, Lerums Tidning, ST-tidningen, Varbergsposten och Vänersborgaren)

=== Adresseavisen Gruppen ===
- Adresseavisen
- Avisa Sør-Trøndelag
- Brønnøysunds Avis
- Fosna-Folket
- Hitra-Frøya
- Innherreds Folkeblad og Verdalingen
- Levanger-Avisa
- Trønderbladet

=== Harstad Tidende Gruppen ===
- Altaposten
- Andøyposten
- Framtid i Nord
- Harstad Tidende
- iTromsø
- SortlandsAvisa
- Troms Folkeblad
- Vesteraalens Avis
- Vesterålen Online

=== Polaris Media Nordvestlandet ===
- Åndalsnes Avis
- Driva
- Fjordenes Tidende
- Fjordingen
- Herøynytt
- Møre-Nytt
- Nyss
- Romsdals Budstikke
- Sunnmørsposten
- Vikebladet Vestposten

=== Polaris Trykk ===
- Byavisa
- Nr1 Adressa-trykk Orkanger
- Polaris Trykk Alta
- Polaris Trykk Harstad
- Polaris Trykk Trondheim
- Polaris Trykk Ålesund
