= Avis 1 =

Norwegian local newspaper

Avis 1 (Gazette 1) was a free newspaper published in Oslo, Norway from 1998 to 2005.

The paper was established by Schibsted in 1998 in order to protect Aftenposten's share of Oslo's advertising market against the free newspaper Osloposten. Avis 1 was discontinued in 2005. During its last year of publication, it had a circulation of 175,000 copies. Its competitor, Osloposten, was discontinued in 2002. The former employees of Avis 1 were then offered jobs at Aftenposten.

Avis 1 was edited by Per A. Borglund.
