= Espen Skistad =

Norwegian footballer (born 1972)

Personal information
- Date of birth: 12 August 1972 (age 54)
- Position: Goalkeeper

Team information
- Current team: Haugesund (goalkeeper coach)

Youth career
- Nord

Senior career*
Years	Team	Apps	(Gls)
–1991	Nord		
1992–1999	Start	1	(0)
1995	→ Strømsgodset (loan)	1	(0)
1996–1999	Fyllingen		
2000–2002	Nord		
2003–2007	Vard Haugesund		

International career
1989	Norway U16	1	(0)

Managerial career
- 2008–2009: Haugar women
- 2010: Haugar
- 2011–?: Haugar (goalkeeper coach)
- 2014–2020: Haugesund (goalkeeper coach)
- * Club domestic league appearances and goals

Espen Skistad (born 12 August 1972) is a retired Norwegian football goalkeeper.

He was a son of manager Brede Skistad. He came through the youth ranks of SK Nord, represented Norway as a youth international and was called up to Norway U21.

When commencing his senior career he joined IK Start where his father became manager. Following very limited playing time, he joined Strømsgodset on loan in 1995. In 1996 he went on a permanent transfer to Fyllingen, before moving home to Haugesund where he played for Nord and SK Vard Haugesund.

In 2008 he started a managing career, for SK Haugar's women. Ahead of the 2010 season he became manager for the men's team. He changed position to goalkeeping coach in 2011. In 2014 he was hired as such in FK Haugesund. In 2016 he took the UEFA A Licence for goalkeeper coaches.

Skistad has also played in a local band and been a football pundit for local radio.
