= Sverre M. Gunnerud =

Sverre Martin Gunnerud (born February 19, 1948) is a Norwegian television presenter, editor, and former managing editor.

Gunnerud edited the magazine Alle Menn in the 1970s. He was the chief editor for the newspaper Morgenbladet from 1982 to 1984, as well as intermittently in the 1980s and 1990s, was the managing editor for the television channel TV+ in the mid-1990s, and was later the publishing director for the Schibsted media group. He was also the managing director of the Riksmål Society's secretariat and the editor of the society's quarterly magazine Ordet (The Word).
