= Torgils Lovra =

Norwegian editor (1909–1998)

Torgils Lovra (17 November 1909 – 11 January 1998) was a Norwegian editor.

He was born in Erfjord Municipality as a son of farmers. He finished his secondary education at Rogaland landsgymnas in 1933.

During the occupation of Norway by Nazi Germany, he joined the Fascist party Nasjonal Samling. In November 1941 he was installed as editor-in-chief of the newspaper Tromsø. In 1944 he briefly edited the magazine I fritiden, an organ for the welfare organization Sol i Arbeid. He also wrote poetry. In 1944 he was enlisted as a German agent by Rolf Arthur Jensen, a Norwegian journalist working for Referat III F of the Sicherheitspolizei. Lovra received the agent name Kristoffer and sent to Sweden. He was to infiltrate Norwegian resistance groups and to report to the German legation in Stockholm. Little came from his efforts, according to historian Tore Pryser.

In 1961 he started the apolitical newspaper Nesodden Budstikke, a local newspaper for Nesodden Municipality. It went defunct after four issues. He died in January 1998.
