= Aalesunds blad =

Norwegian newspaper

Aalesunds blad (The Ålesund Gazette) was a newspaper published in Ålesund, Norway between 1871 and 1895. The newspaper was politically conservative. In its first years, the editorial board consisted of the merchant Frants Mathias Olsen and printer Klaus Emil Fjelde, assisted by the lawyers Peter Anton Devold and Hans Anton Staboe Schjølberg. Responsibility was eventually taken over by the telegraph director Edvard Endresen.

In 1896, the paper changed its name to Søndmøre Folketidende.
