= Anita Østby =

Norwegian politician (born 1972)

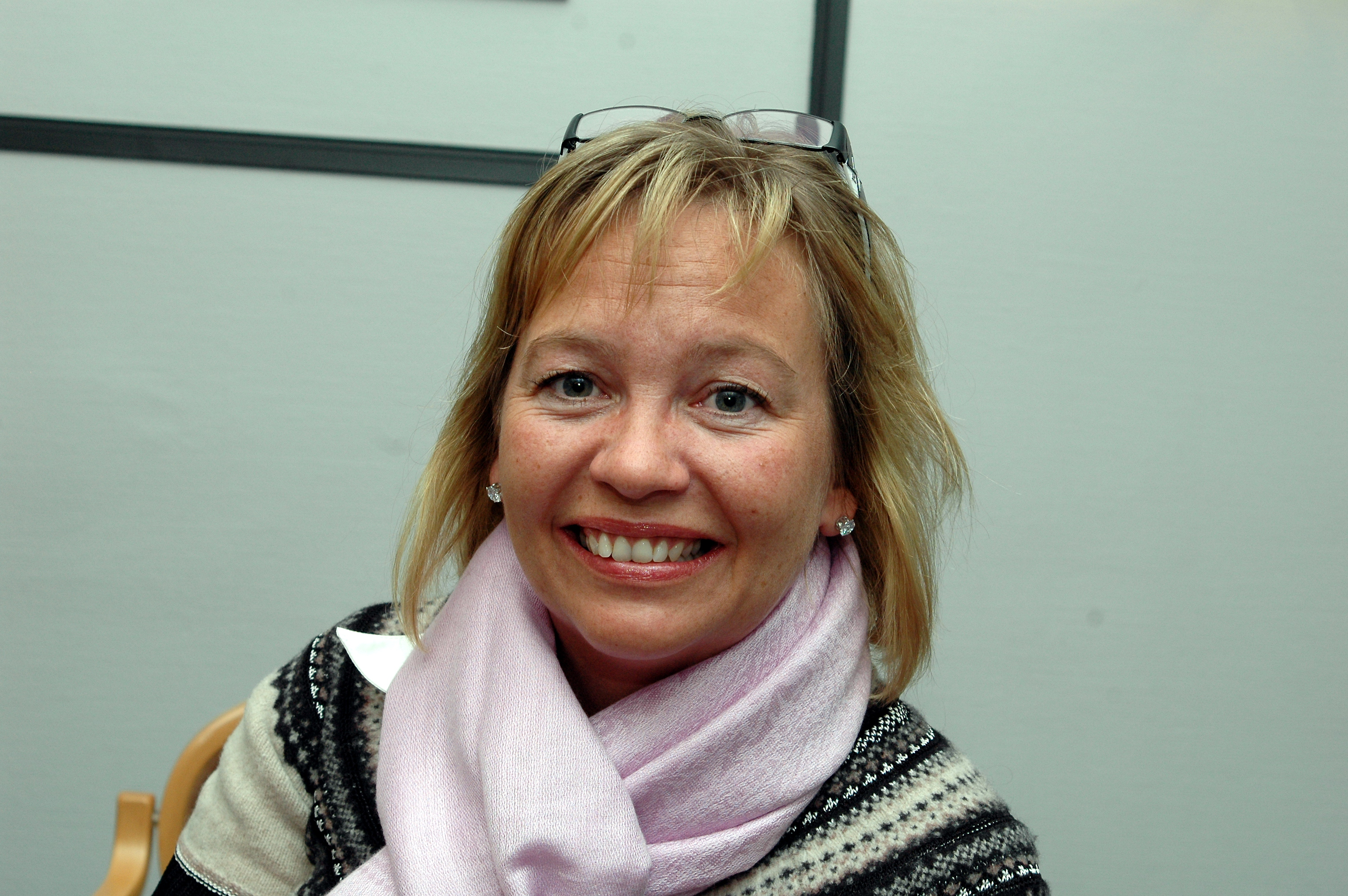
Anita Østby

Anita Østby (born 25 January 1972) is a Norwegian politician for the Liberal Party.

She served as a deputy representative to the Norwegian Parliament from Nord-Trøndelag during the terms 2005–2009.
