= Alle Menn =

Norwegian magazine

Alle Menn (meaning Every Man in English) was a Norwegian weekly magazine that was first published in 1929 by the company Forlagshuset as the crime-story magazine Mystikk. In 1945 the name of the publication was changed to the more attractive title Alle Menns Blad (Every Man's Magazine) and it was published on a monthly basis. In 1962 the name of the magazine was changed once again, to Alle Menn, and it was published by Gyldendal Norsk Forlag until 1974. The magazine ceased publication in 2006.

== 1929–1945 ==
Mystikk – Magasinet for detektivhistorier og fantastiske hendelser (Mystikk: The Magazine for Detective Stories and Fantastic Events), which was published weekly until 1943, contained only one detective story in its first years, illustrated and translated from English. Towards the end of the 1930s, the magazine started containing a main story and several shorter stories. In 1943 the magazine was given the secondary title Et blad for alle menn (A Magazine for Every Man) and started carrying comics, short reports, and the feature Frimerkesamler'n (The Stamp Collector) before its publication was interrupted because of the Second World War. Four issues of Mystikk appeared in 1945 before the magazine's name was changed to Alle Menns Blad (Every Man's Magazine).

== 1945–1962 ==
Alle Menns Blad stated appearing in August 1945 without any difference other than its logo from the four preceding issues that year. At the beginning of the 1950s, the magazine started featuring photographs, many drawings, Western fiction, reports, and a series called Gamle norske kriminalsaker (Old Norwegian Criminal Cases). In 1954 the magazine was sold to the company Romanforlaget, and in 1961 and 1962 four installments of Ian Fleming's The Spy Who Loved Me appeared in it for the first time in Norwegian.

== 1962–2006 ==
In December 1961 Alle Menns Blad was purchased by Gyldendal Norsk Forlag, which also owned Alle Kvinners Blad (Every Woman's Magazine), and starting with issue 8 in 1962 the name was changed to Alle Menn (Every Man). That same year, it started the feature Lykkepiken (Happy Girl), with black-and-white pictures of scantily clad women. Issue 5 of Alle Menn in 1966 featured Norway's first color centerfold. The feature Piker med futt (Girls with Spunk) followed this, with pictures and interviews of women with special backgrounds, including Åse Kleveland, Inger Lise Rypdal, and Grynet Molvig, and the magazine started printing crime stories selected from the works of Alfred Hitchcock.

Starting in the mid-1970s, the magazine began featuring many photos of nude women and fewer stories, and from number 40/41 in 1979 onward the magazine's focus was on sex with as many pictures as possible of women in the least amount of clothing, and with a new column with readers' own sexual experiences. From 1989 to 1993, a parallel publication, Alle Menn Spesial (Every Man's Special), was also issued with two front covers titled Spesial and Action.

In 2004 Alle Menn changed its profile to a men's journalism magazine, and the last issue of the magazine was published in 2006.

== Publishers ==
The magazine was published by the following companies from 1929 to 2006:

- 1929–1954: Forlagshuset
- 1954–1961: Romanforlaget
- 1962–1974: Gyldendal Norsk Forlag
- 1974–1979: Nordisk Forlag
- 1979–198?: Saxon og Lindström (for a while also called Alle Menn Forlag)
- 198?–1994: Saxon Forlag
- 1994–2006: Nordic Publishing

== Editors ==
The magazine Alle Menn had the following editors until 1997:

- 1960–1974: Per Aaeng
- 197?–1977: Sverre M. Gunnerud
- 1977–1979: Egil Ulateig
- 1979: Steinar Nyborg
- 1979–1984: Sten Ture Jensen
- 1984–1986: Sverre Olsen
- 1986–?: Øyvind Norstrøm
- ?–1994: Terje Øygard
- 1994–1997: Stein-Erik Mattsson
