= Thorvald Wilhelmsen =

Thorvald Wilhelmsen (14 February 1912 – 13 September 1996) was a Norwegian long-distance runner who specialized in the 10,000 metres. He represented the club Grue-Finnskog IL.

He never participated in the Summer Olympics, but finished seventh at the 1946 European Championships at Bislett stadion in a personal best time of 31:20.8 minutes. This remained his career best time. He became Norwegian champion in 1946, but his career was interrupted by World War II in Norway from 1940 to 1945.
