= Synnøve Konglevoll =

Norwegian politician

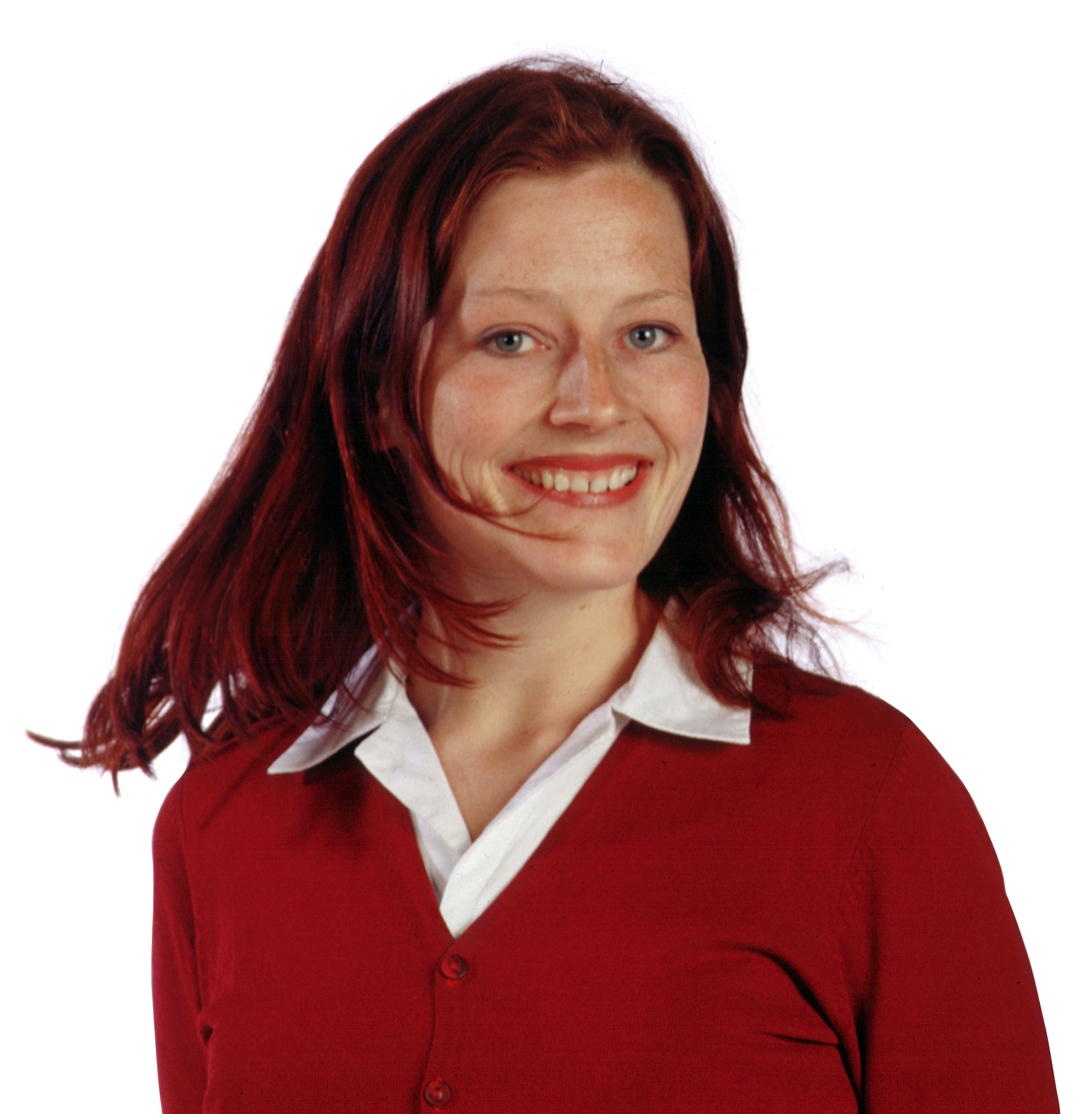
Synnøve Konglevoll

Synnøve Konglevoll (born 16 June 1972 in Tromsø) is a Norwegian politician for the Labour Party.

She was elected to the Norwegian Parliament from Troms in 1997, and was re-elected on one occasion.

She is also deputy chairman of the board of the Norwegian Society for the Conservation of Nature.
