= Aktuell Rapport =

Swedish pornographic magazine

- October 2005 cover (Norwegian edition) featuring Anette Dawn
- Editor: Lau Larsen
- Former editors: Stein-Erik Mattsson (2000–2003)
- Categories: Pornography, entertainment
- Frequency: Monthly
- Publisher: Tre-mag Sweden AB
- First issue: 1976; 50 years ago
- Final issue: 2012; 14 years ago
- Country: Norway
- Language: Swedish, Norwegian
- Website: aktuellrapport.se

Aktuell Rapport was a pornographic magazine published in Sweden, and also sold in a Norwegian edition. Published by Tre-mag Sweden AB of Stockholm, and printed in Austria, it also contains a significant amount of non-pornographic features.

== History ==
Aktuell Rapport was first published as Rapport 76 in Norway in 1976 by Leif Hagen, and prominently featured a mail-order catalogue for his company L. Hagen Import. From initially being a monthly publication, it progressed to weekly publication during the 1980s, before assuming the current bi-weekly frequency.

The current editor is Lau Larsen. The magazine was edited from 2000 to 2003 by Stein-Erik Mattsson.

Aktuell Rapport had a circulation of around 25,000 copies in Norway in 2007.
