= Levanger-Avisa =

Regional newspaper in Norway

Levanger-Avisa was a local newspaper published in Levanger, Norway. The newspaper was founded in 1848 and it was Norway's fifth-oldest newspaper still being published. It was majority-owned by Polaris Media. The publisher is a company with the same name, Levanger-Avisa AS. Levanger-Avisa became the Local Newspaper of the Year in Norway in 1999. The newspaper merged with Innherreds Folkeblad og Verdalingen on 30 May 2015 to create Innherred.
