= Ebbe Hertzberg =

Norwegian professor and social economist (1847–1912)

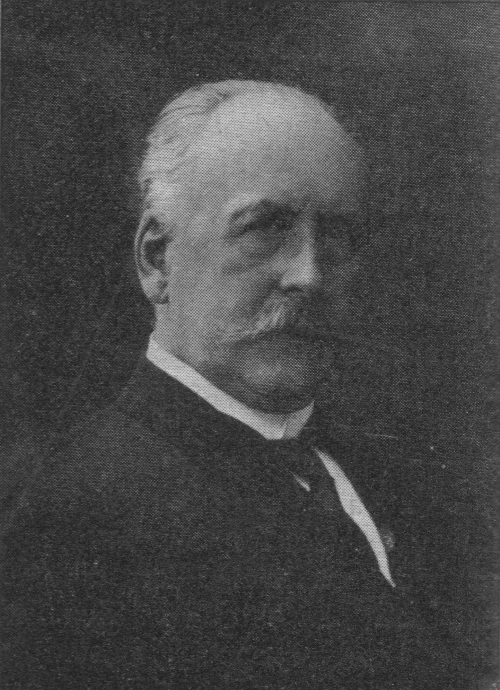
- Ebbe Hertzberg. Photography by Gustav Borgen
- Born: 11 April 1847; Holmestrand, Norway
- Died: 2 October 1912 (aged 65)
- Occupations: legal historian and social economist
- Awards: Order of St. Olav

Ebbe Carsten Hornemann Hertzberg (11 April 1847 – 2 October 1912) was a Norwegian professor and social economist. He was also a legal historian and published several works in that field.

== Biography ==
Hertzberg was born at Holmestrand in Vestfold, Norway. He was the son of Johan Christian Linde Hertzberg (1816–1884) and Inger Horneman (1820–1895). He attended the University of Christiania (now University of Oslo). In 1868, he was awarded the Crown Prince's gold medal (Kronprinsens gullmedalje) for a thesis regarding changes in Norwegian judicial institutions. He graduated as cand.jur. in 1870. He earned a travel scholarship and studied at Uppsala University from 1870. From 1872 to 1873, he studied under legal historian Konrad Maurer at the Ludwig-Maximilians-Universität München.

He was appointed professor of statistics and economics at the University of Christiania in 1877. He was a short-time government minister from April to June in 1884 as a member of the Council of State Division in Stockholm.

In 1886, Hertzberg withdrew from public life and moved away from Kristiania for a decade. Officially, this was motivated by a desire to focus on his research, but in reality he had been pushed to resign by the university after admitting to being homosexual. During his exile at the Friedrich Wilhelm University of Berlin, Holmestrand, the Ludwig-Maximilians-Universität München, and Stockholm University, he completed his greatest work, a glossary of historic Norwegian legal terms, Glossarium til Norges gamle love.

In 1896, he returned to Kristiania where in 1903 he became director of Norges Hypotekbank and in 1906 he was appointed as an administrator in the National Archives. In 1901, he was awarded Knight 1st Class and in 1907 was decorated Commander of the Royal Norwegian Order of St. Olav.

In 1902, Ebbe Hertzbergs was the anonymous author of the essay "Traces of Contrary Sexuality among the Ancient Scandinavians" in Magnus Hirschfeld's German-speaking Yearbook for Sexual Intermediates (Jahrbuch für sexuelle Zwischenstufen).

== Selected works ==
- Grundtrækkene i den ældste norske proces (1874)
- Om kreditens begreb og væsen (1877)
- Glossarium til Norges gamle love (1895)

== Bibliography ==
- Glossarium zu Norges gamle Love indtil 1387. Volltextversion auf CD-ROM eingeleitet u. mit e. Bibliographie versehen von Hans Fix. Saarbrücken: AQ-Verlag 2013. ISBN 978-3-922441-47-2
