= Kirsti Husby =

Norwegian newspaper editor and media executive

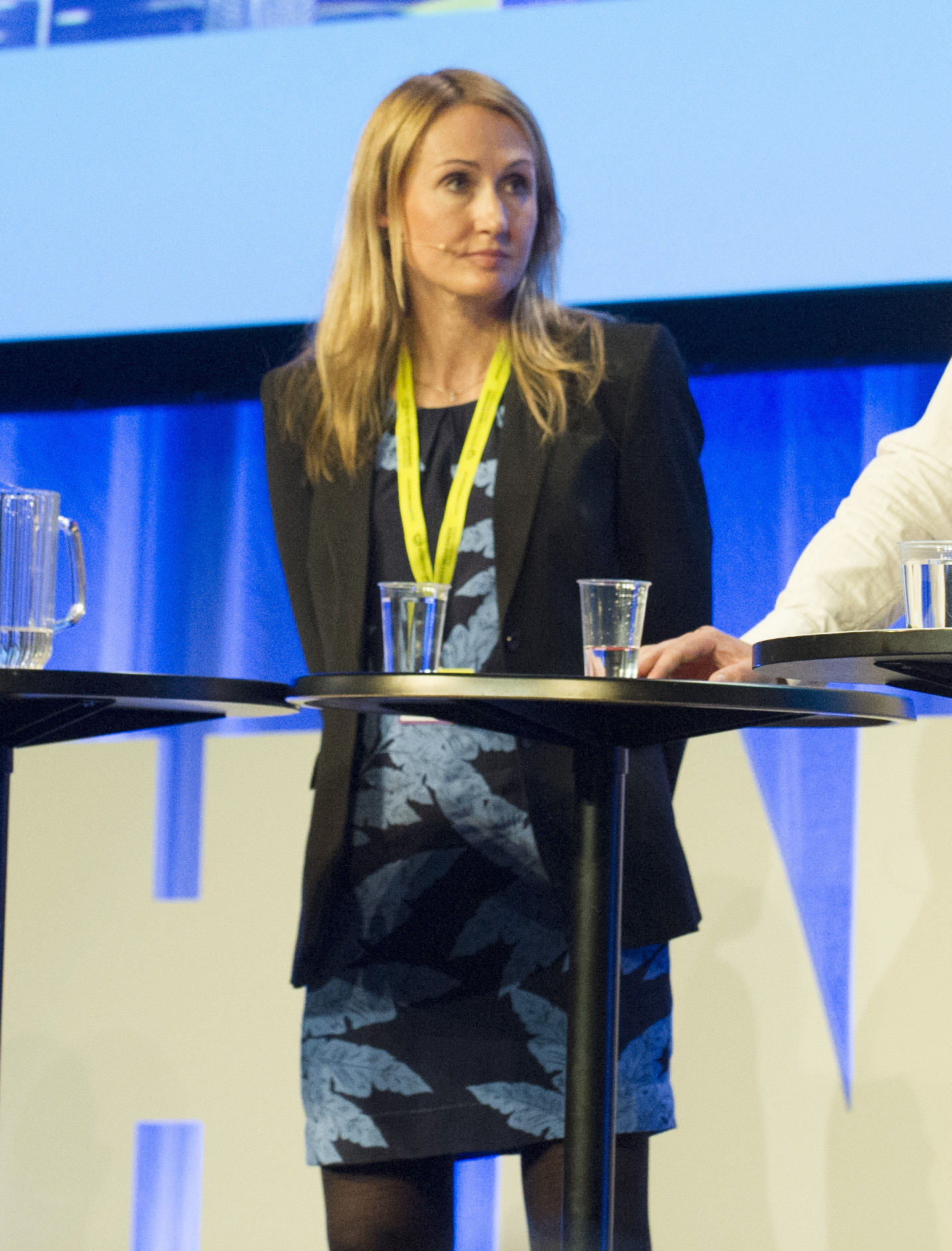
- Born: 6 May 1972 (age 54); Trondheim, Norway
- Education: Norwegian University of Science and Technology; Høgskulen i Volda
- Occupation: Newspaper editor
- Employer: Adresseavisen

Kirsti Husby (born 06 May 1972) is a Norwegian newspaper editor and media executive. Since 2017 she has been chief editor of the newspaper Adresseavisen.

== Career ==
Born in Trondheim on 6 May 1972, Husby graduated with a cand. mag. degree from the Norwegian University of Science and Technology, and has studied journalism at Høgskulen i Volda.

She started working as journalist for the newspaper Adresseavisen in 1998, and eventually assumed editorial positions in the newspaper. She was appointed chief editor of the newspaper from 2017.

Media offices
Preceded by Tor Olav Mørseth	Chief editor of Adresseavisen; 2017–	Succeeded by incumbent
