= Sander Solberg =

Norwegian footballer (born 1972)

Personal information
- Date of birth: 12 May 1972 (age 54)
- Place of birth: Fredrikstad, Norway
- Position: Midfielder

Senior career*
Years	Team	Apps	(Gls)
1988–1991	Fredrikstad		
1992–1995	Viking	83	(10)
1996	Fredrikstad		
1997–1998	Strømsgodset	38	(2)
1999	Moss	3	(0)

International career
1989	Norway U18	9	(0)
1991–1993	Norway U21	19	(2)

Managerial career
- 2018: Kråkerøy (U19)
- 2019–2021: Sarpsborg 08 (U16)
- 2022–: Fredrikstad (U16)
- * Club domestic league appearances and goals

Sander Solberg (born 12 May 1972) is a retired Norwegian football midfielder.

A prolific Norway U21 player, he also appeared in exhibition matches for Norway. He was almost signed by Heart of Midlothian F.C. in late 1997.

Ahead of the 2018 season he was hired as junior coach in Kråkerøy IL, and was subsequently hired as U16 coach of Sarpsborg 08 FF. Ahead of the 2022 season he went on to Fredrikstad's U16.
