= Trønderbladet =

Norwegian newspaper

- Type: Local
- Format: Tabloid and online
- Owner: Polaris Media
- Founded: 1979
- Language: Norwegian
- City: Melhus
- Country: Norway
- Circulation: 5,116 (as of 2013)
- Website: tronderbladet.no

Trønderbladet is a local online and print newspaper published in Melhus Municipality, Norway. It covers the news in Melhus Municipality, Skaun Municipality, Midtre Gauldal Municipality, and southern Trondheim Municipality. Published in tabloid format, the newspaper had a circulation of 5,116 in 2013. The newspaper is owned by Polaris Media. It has three weekly issues, on Tuesdays, Thursdays, and Saturdays. The newspaper was founded in 1979.
