= Thorleif Lintrup Paus =

Norwegian diplomat (1912–2006)

Thorleif Lintrup Paus (6 January 1912 – 28 November 2006) was a Norwegian lawyer and diplomat.

Born at Rjukan, he finished law school in 1937 and worked as a judge before joining the diplomatic service after World War II. He was a bureau chief at the Foreign Ministry, first secretary at the embassy in Washington D.C. and the mission in Bern, counselor at the embassy in London, counselor at the embassy in Rome and, from 1962, consul general in Singapore.

In 1965, the King appointed him ambassador to Iran and, in 1969, the ambassador to Brazil. Finally, he was ambassador to Mexico until retiring in 1980.

== Honours ==
- Commander of the Royal Norwegian Order of St. Olav (1972)

Diplomatic posts
Preceded by	Ambassador of the Kingdom of Norway to Iran; 1965–1969	Succeeded by
Preceded by	Ambassador of the Kingdom of Norway to Brazil; 1969–	Succeeded by
Preceded by	Ambassador of the Kingdom of Norway to Mexico –1980	Succeeded by
