= Jarle Wee =

Norwegian footballer (born 1972)

Personal information
- Date of birth: 2 February 1972 (age 54)
- Place of birth: Norway
- Height: 1.77 m (5 ft 9 1/2 in)
- Position: Striker

Senior career*
Years	Team	Apps	(Gls)
–1993	Haugar		
1994–2000	FK Haugesund		
2001	Motala		
2002–2012	Vard		
- * Club domestic league appearances and goals

Jarle Wee (born 2 February 1972) was a Norwegian football striker.

In his early career he played for SK Haugar. The team played in the second highest league in Norway, but performed badly in the 1992 season, conceding 97 goals. When the club FK Haugesund was formed through a merger, Wee joined that team. In the 1994 league opener he scored 4 goals against Os TF. When the club won promotion to the Norwegian Premier League after the 1996 season, Wee was the club's all-time top goalscorer. In 2001, he signed up with Motala AIF. When he came back from Sweden the next year, he signed up with SK Vard Haugesund and retired in 2012.
