= Osloposten =

Norwegian local newspaper

Osloposten (The Oslo Gazette) was a free newspaper published in Oslo, Norway from 1997 to 2002.

The paper was published by the Danish newspaper company Søndagsavisen AS in Oslo via its subsidiary Norsk Avisdrift. The paper was launched in 1997 and was distributed in 234,000 copies before it was discontinued in 2002. The paper failed to succeed against its competitor, Avis 1, which was established by Schibsted in order to protect Schibsted's share of Oslo's advertising market. Avis 1 was discontinued in 2005.
