= Kari-Anne Jønnes =

Norwegian politician

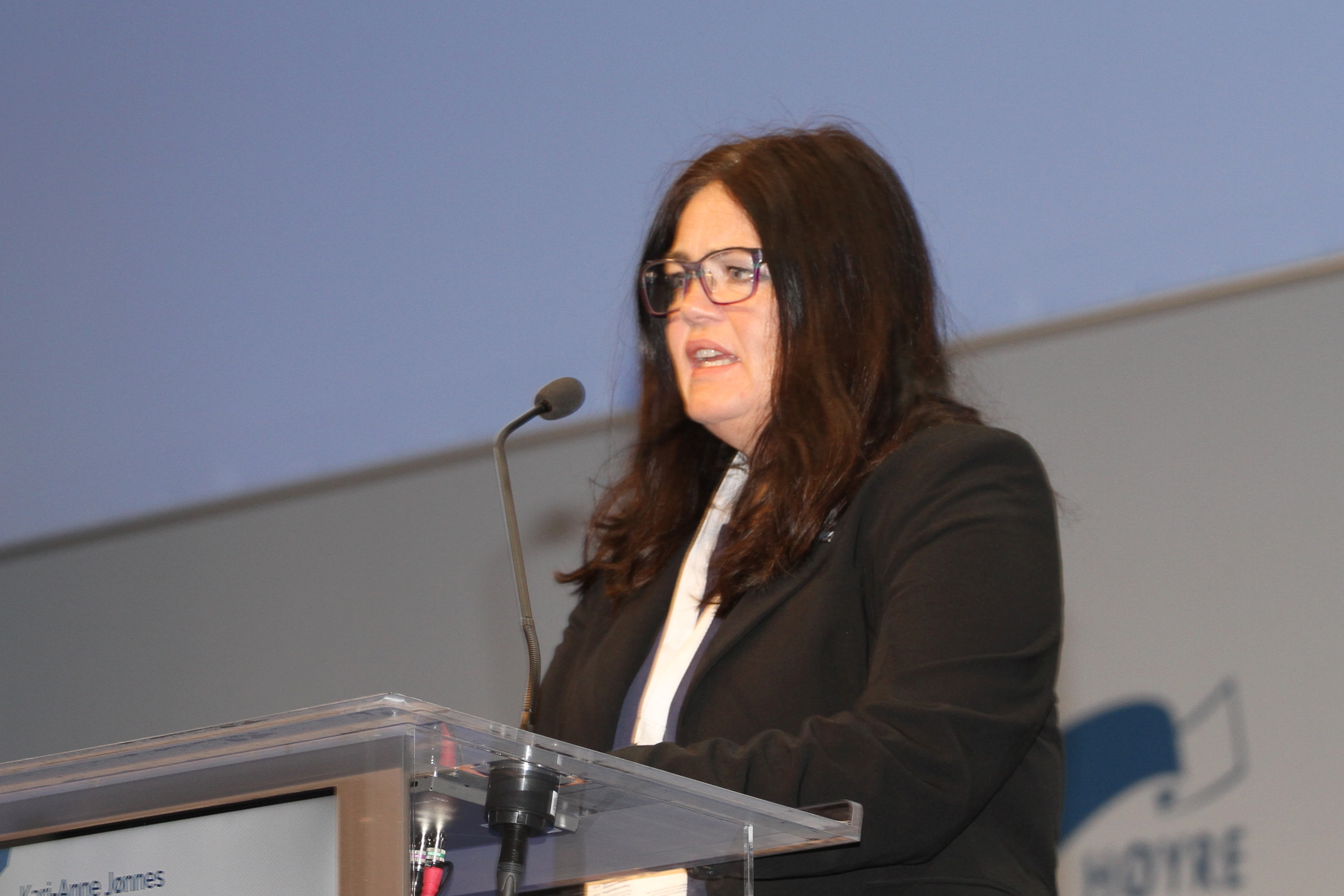

Member of the Storting
- In office 1 October 2021 – 30 September 2025
- Constituency: Oppland

Personal details
- Born: 13 April 1972 (age 54)
- Party: Conservative
- Occupation: Politician

Kari-Anne Jønnes (born 13 April 1972) is a Norwegian politician for the Conservative Party. She was a member of the Storting between 2021 and 2025.

== Biography ==
Jønnes was born on 13 April 1972. She hails from Gran Municipality, and was a member of the municipal council of Gran Municipality from 2007 to 2015.

She was elected representative to the Storting from the constituency of Oppland for the period 2021–2025, for the Conservative Party. She was a deputy representative from 2017 to 2021. She attempted to get re-elected in the 2025 election, but she and the Conservative Party lost their seat and representantion from Oppland electoral district.

In the Storting, she was a member of the Standing Committee on Education and Research for the period 2021–2025.
