= Innherreds Folkeblad og Verdalingen =

Local newspaper in Verdal, Norway

- Type: Local
- Format: Tabloid and online
- Owner: Polaris Media
- Founded: 1952
- Language: Norwegian
- City: Verdal
- Country: Norway
- Circulation: 4,413 (as of 2013)
- Website: verdalingen.no

Innherreds Folkeblad og Verdalingen was a local online and print newspaper that was published in Verdalsøra in Verdal Municipality, Norway. Owned 97.6 percent by Polaris Media, the newspaper has a circulation of 4,413 in 2013. It has three weekly issues, on Tuesdays, Thursdays and Saturdays. Published in tabloid format, the newspaper was created in 1952 through a merger to Innherreds Folkeblad and Verdalingen. The newspaper merged with Levanger-Avisa on 30 May 2015 to create Innherred.
