= Aalesunds Handels- og Sjøfartstidende =

Norwegian conservative newspaper

Aalesunds Handels- og Søfartstidende (The Ålesund Trade and Maritime Journal) was a newspaper published in Ålesund, Norway from 1856 to 1904. From 1872 to 1876 it was published under the name Aalesunds Tidende (The Ålesund Journal). It was the first newspaper published in Ålesund. The newspaper had a conservative stance.
