= Per Imerslund =

Norwegian national socialist

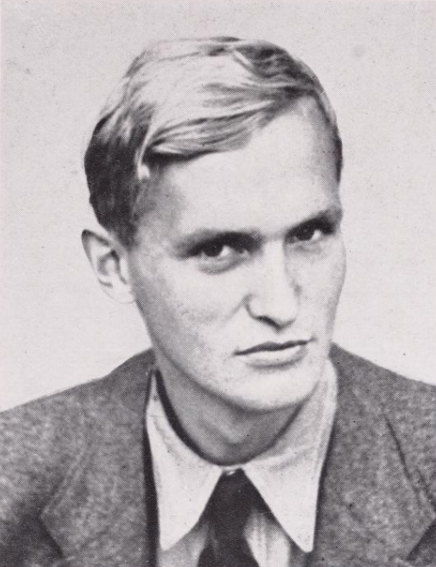
- Born: Nils Per Imerslund; 9 May 1912; Kristiania, Norway
- Died: 7 December 1943 (aged 31); Aker University Hospital, Oslo, German-occupied Norway
- Cause of death: Blood poisoning
- Military career
- Allegiance: Nazi Germany
- Branch: Waffen SS
- Service years: 1941–1943
- Rank: Oberscharführer

Nils Per Imerslund (9 May 1912 – 7 December 1943), born in Kristiania, Norway, was one of the most prominent figures of the Nazi scene in pre-World War II Norway. He first gained prominence at home and abroad with the publication in 1936 of his début book, Das Land Noruega, a fictionalised autobiography of his youth in Mexico. His blonde, blue-eyed stature and extravagant way of life gave him the position of "the Aryan Idol". A loathing of his homosexuality and self-perceived feminine traits, led him to frequently risk his life. He lived most of his early years in Mexico and Germany, fought alongside the Sturmabteilung (SA) in Berlin in the 1930s, fought alongside the Fascist Falange in the Spanish Civil War, and finally joined the Waffen-SS to fight in Ukraine and Finland, where he was severely injured. He died at Aker University Hospital on 7 December 1943. Imerslund also participated in radio broadcasts in the Nazi-controlled Norwegian Broadcasting Corporation.

== Selected works ==
- Imerslund, Per (1936). Das Land Noruega: Erlebnisse in Mexico (in German). Leipzig: Insel-Verlag. OCLC 10332738.

== Relevant publications ==
- Emberland, Terje, and Bernt Rougthvedt. Det ariske idol: Forfatteren, eventyreren og nazisten Per Imerslund. Aschehoug, 2004.
- Montfort, Ricardo Pérez. "Three Norwegian Experiences in Post-Revolutionary Mexico: Per Imerslund, Halfdan Jebe and Ola Apenes." In Expectations Unfulfilled: Norwegian Migrants in Latin America, 1820-1940, pp. 184–224. Brill, 2016.
- Neyens, Mieke. "Revisiting the revolution: a Norwegian Nazi in 1930s Mexico." Studies in Travel Writing 19, no. 4 (2015): 358-376.
