= Troms Folkeblad =

Norwegian newspaper

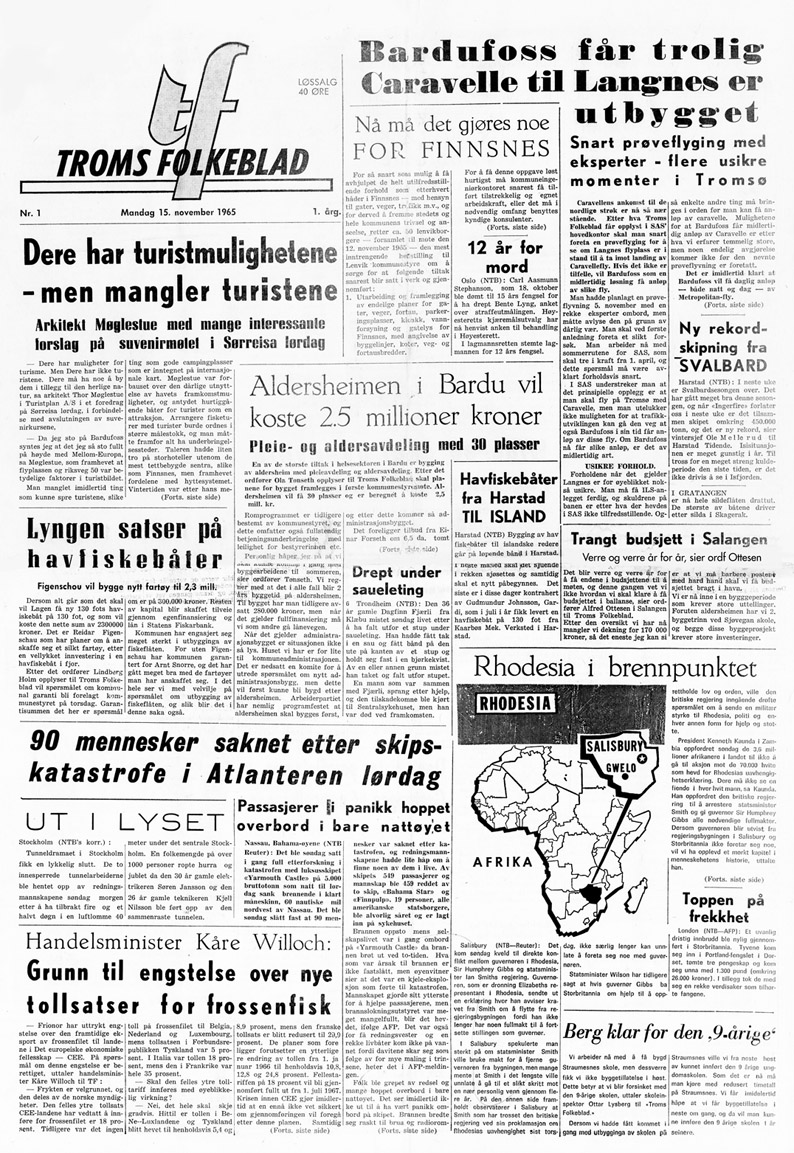
Frontpage Troms Folkeblads first edition, 15 November 1965

Troms Folkeblad is a newspaper published in Troms county, Norway. Its main office is located in the town of Finnsnes in Senja Municipality.

== History and profile ==
Troms Folkeblad was first published on 15 November 1965. The paper is part of Polaris Media and is published by Harstad Tidende Gruppen AS, a subsidiary of Polaris Media. It covers stories in the neighboring municipalities of Senja, Sørreisa, Dyrøy, Salangen, Lavangen, Bardu, and Målselv. The chief editor and publisher is Steinulf Henriksen.

The printed edition is published daily, except Sunday. The newspaper had 24,000 readers in 2007.
