= Lek (magazine) =

Norwegian softcore pornographic magazine

- Former editors: Linda Johansen (1993–1998)
- Categories: Softcore pornography
- Frequency: Quarterly
- First issue: 1971; 55 years ago
- Company: MP House
- Country: Norway
- Based in: Oslo
- Language: Norwegian
- Website: lek.no

Lek (Norwegian for 'play') is a softcore pornographic magazine published quarterly by MP House. The magazine was first published in 1971 and it contained erotic photos and stories. The magazine later moved to more pornographic content with pictures of amateur and professional models. Lek became increasingly popular after Linda Johansen became the magazine's editor in 1993.

== Affiliated publications ==
- Lek Fetish with fetish pornography
- Lek special, with different topic in every issue
- Kontakt-forum, later Lek-forum, personal advertisements published since 1993.
