= Fosna-Folket =

Norwegian newspaper

Fosna-Folket is a newspaper published in Brekstad, Norway. It covers the district of Fosen, serving the areas of Osen Municipality, Åfjord Municipality, Ørland Municipality, and Indre Fosen Municipality. The newspaper is published three days a week: Tuesdays, Thursdays an Fridays. In 2009, it had a circulation of 7,314. The newspaper is owned by Adresseavisen.
