= Harald Torp =

Norwegian newspaper editor and politician (1890–1972)

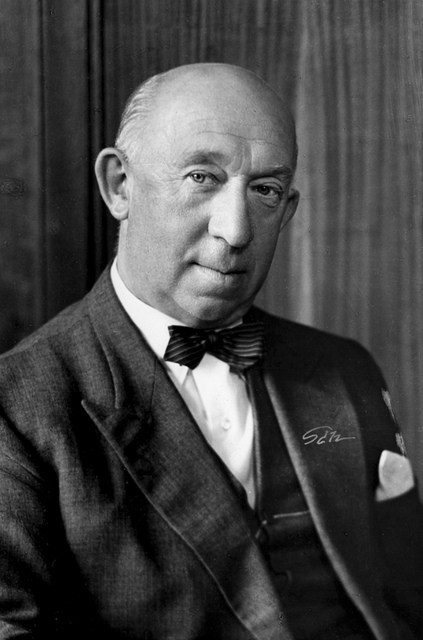

Harald Vincent Houge Torp (14 May 1890 – 1 December 1972) was a Norwegian newspaper editor and politician for the Conservative Party.

He was elected to the Parliament of Norway from the Market towns of Sør-Trøndelag and Nord-Trøndelag counties in 1937, was not re-elected in 1945 but returned for one term in 1954. Torp was a member of the executive committee of Trondheim city council from 1931 to 1937 and 1947 to 1959.

In addition he worked in various newspapers. He was born in Lillehammer and graduated with the cand.oecon. degree in 1912, and was a journalist in Aftenposten 1914–1916 and 1919–1925 as well as Morgenbladet in 1917, and editor-in-chief of Lillehammer Tilskuer 1917–1919 and Adresseavisen 1927–1941 and 1945–1969. He chaired the Conservative Press Association from 1935 to 1951, and was a board member of the Norwegian News Agency from 1951 to 1969.

Media offices
Preceded by Harald Lundh-Nilssen	Editor-in-chief of Adresseavisen; 1927–1941	Succeeded by Jacob Skylstad (Nazi)
Preceded by Jacob Skylstad (Nazi)	Editor-in-chief of Adresseavisen; 1945–1969	Succeeded by Fridtjof M. Ålstedt
