= Stian Larsen =

Norwegian footballer (born 1972)

Stian Larsen (born 11 August 1972) is a retired Norwegian football defender.

He hails from Randaberg Municipality and started his youth career in Grødem IL. He was signed by first-tier club Viking FK and made his debut at the age of seventeen. However, as he was poised to study physiotherapy in Tromsø, he joined Tromsø IL in mid-1994. Here, he enjoyed success and won the 1996 Norwegian Football Cup. He then only played six league games in 1997 and seven in 1998. He moved back to Rogaland and played for Bryne FK and Randaberg IL before retiring in 2001.
