= Gøril Kringen =

Norwegian footballer and coach (born 1972)

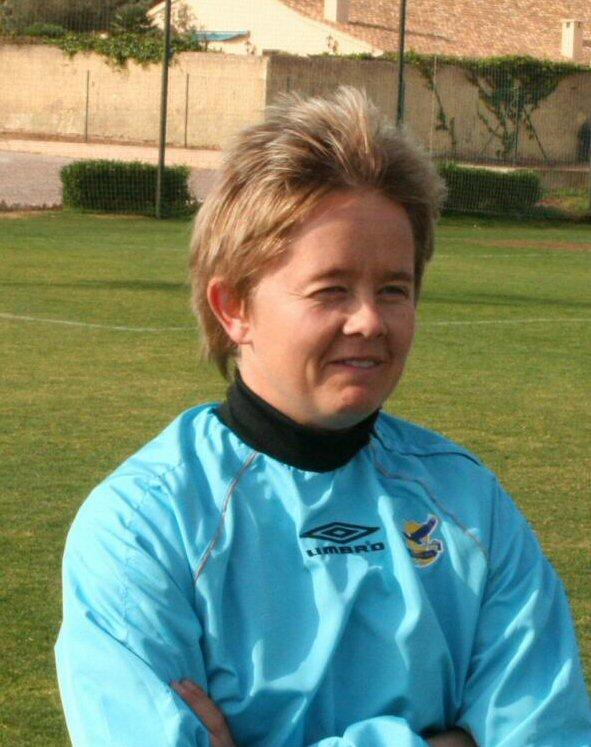

Personal information
- Full name: Gøril Kringen
- Date of birth: 28 January 1972 (age 54)
- Place of birth: Trondheim, Norway
- Height: 5 ft 5 in (1.65 m)
- Position: Defender

Youth career
- IL Stjørdals-Blink

Senior career*
Years	Team	Apps	(Gls)
1990–2005	Trondheims-Ørn		

International career^{‡}
1995–2001	Norway	72	(0)

Managerial career
- 2006–2010: Trondheims-Ørn
Medal record
Women's football
Representing Norway
Olympic Games
Gold medal – first place	2000 Atlanta	Team competition
- * Club domestic league appearances and goals as of 7 October 2014 ‡ National team caps and goals as of 7 October 2014

Gøril Kringen (born 28 January 1972) is a Norwegian former football player and coach, who has also worked as the Football Association of Norway's (NFF) head of women's football. As a player, she was an Olympic champion with the Norway women's national football team. She played club football for Trondheims-Ørn, and holds the record for total matches played for the club (515).

== Playing career ==
Playing for SK Trondheims-Ørn, Kringen won the Norwegian league seven times between 1994 and 2003. She also won the Norwegian Women's Cup eight times with Trondheims-Ørn.

Kringen made her senior national team debut in July 1995—a 2–0 win over Australia—but she was not selected for Norway's victorious 1995 FIFA Women's World Cup squad. She was on the Norwegian team that hosted UEFA Women's Euro 1997 and then finished fourth at the 1999 FIFA Women's World Cup in the United States.

She collected a total of 72 caps for Norway and won gold at the 2000 Summer Olympics in Sydney. She was Norway's captain in their UEFA Women's Euro 2001 campaign, which ended with a 1–0 defeat by hosts Germany in the semi-final.

== Coaching career ==
Kringen coached Trondheims-Ørn (2006–2010) and has also coached Norway's Under-23 team. In 2012 Kringen served as an assistant coach at Ranheim Fotball in the Norwegian [men's] First Division. She was the first woman to coach a team in the top two levels of the Norwegian football league system.

In May 2013 Kringen was appointed the Football Association of Norway's (NFF) head of women's football.
