= Johannes Seland =

Norwegian politician (1912–1999)

Mayor of Flekkefjord Municipality

Deputy representative to the Storting for Vest-Agder
- In office 1954–1957

Personal details
- Born: September 14, 1912 Norway
- Died: December 31, 1999 (aged 87) Norway
- Party: Liberal Party
- Occupation: Journalist, politician, editor-in-chief

Johannes Seland (14 September 1912 – 31 December 1999) was a Norwegian politician for the Liberal Party.

He served as a deputy representative to the Norwegian Parliament from Vest-Agder during the term 1954–1957.

He was also the editor-in-chief of Fædrelandsvennen as well as mayor of Flekkefjord Municipality.
