= Sverre Heiberg =

Norwegian photographer

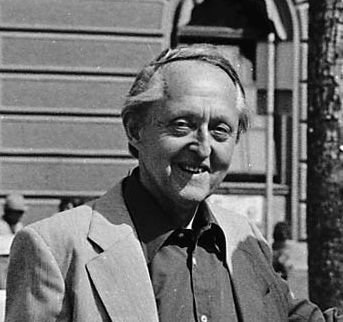
- Born: 4 July 1912; Elverum, Norway
- Died: 3 May 1991 (aged 78)
- Occupation: photographer

Sverre Heiberg (4 July 1912 – 3 May 1991) was a Norwegian photographer. He was born in Elverum. He worked as photographer for the newspaper Dagbladet from 1936 to 1988, except for the war years when Dagbladet closed down. Through his photographic works he documented the city of Oslo, the changes over time, people's life and important events. His photo collection was transferred to Oslo Bymuseum in 1989. He was awarded Oslo Arkitektforening's honorary prize in 1979, and the City of Oslo's Art Prize in 1985.
