= Lars Joachim Grimstad =

Norwegian footballer (born 1972)

Personal information
- Date of birth: 8 October 1972 (age 54)
- Position: Midfielder

Senior career*
Years	Team	Apps	(Gls)
1988–1998	Stabæk Fotball		
- * Club domestic league appearances and goals

Lars Joachim Grimstad (born 8 October 1972) is a retired Norwegian football midfielder and children's writer.

He moved to Stabekk at the age of 9, and started playing for Stabæk Fotball. He made his debut for the senior team in 1988, when they were languishing in the low leagues. However, he helped the club win successive promotions to the Norwegian Premier League. He scored 5 goals in 69 Premier League games between 1995 and 1997. He was operated for an injury ahead of the 1998 season, and was in the squad, but did not play and never returned to football. His diagnosis was "pigmented villonodular synovitis".

After retirement he was hired to work with marketing and advertisement in the company Dinamo. He later switched company to Try.

Grimstad also became a children's writer. He issued the book Statsminister Fahr & Sønn. Barna som forsvant on the publishing house Aschehoug in 2012, and followed with Solkongen (2014), Egoland (2016) and Meningen med Leif (2019).
