= Thormod Ness =

Norwegian footballer and coach (born 1972)

Personal information
- Date of birth: 27 November 1972 (age 53)
- Place of birth: Norway
- Height: 1.85 m (6 ft 1 in)
- Position: Defender

Senior career*
Years	Team	Apps	(Gls)
- Skånevik
- Vard
1996–2001	Haugesund		
2002	Sogndal	8	(1)
2004–2005	Vard		

Managerial career
- 2006: Vard (assistant coach)
- 2008–present: Torvastad
- * Club domestic league appearances and goals

Thormod Ness (born 27 November 1972) is a Norwegian football coach and former player.

He started his career in Skånevik IL, and later went to SK Vard Haugesund. He joined FK Haugesund in 1996, and enjoyed a spell in the Norwegian Premier League in the seasons 1997 and 1998. The team was relegated that year, but returned in 2000. Ness was the team captain at that time.

He left Haugesund ahead of the 2002 season for Sogndal Fotball. However, he broke his leg in May 2002, and when he returned to football two and a half years later, his club was Vard Haugesund. He retired ahead of the 2006 season, this time due to a back injury.

Having been offered non-playing positions in different clubs already in 2005, Ness worked as an assistant coach for Vard in 2006. Ahead of the 2007 season Vard was looking for a new head coach. Ness applied for the job, but as Vard hired Steinar Lein, Ness was only offered to continue as assistant coach, which he rejected. He also rejected another offer to do a comeback as a player. Ahead of the 2008 season, Ness became the head coach of Torvastad IL on the fifth tier of Norwegian football.
