= Hitra–Frøya =

Norwegian newspaper

Hitra–Frøya is a Norwegian newspaper, published in Hitra Municipality, Norway. The newspaper was founded in 1974 as Hitra-Nytt, and was called Hitra–Frøya from 1985. Editor-in-chief from 2023 is Lena Jørgensen.
