= Ove Skaug =

Norwegian engineer and civil servant

Ove Skaug (10 November 1912 – 27 August 2005) was a Norwegian engineer and civil servant.

Born in Horten, he took his examen artium in 1932. He graduated with the siv.ing. degree in electronic engineering from the Norwegian Institute of Technology in 1937.

Skaug worked twenty years as deputy as chief of operations of Trondheim Sporvei, the municipal tram company in Trondheim. In 1958 he was appointed director, but the following year he quit to become chief of administration for the municipality. From 1960, he became director of Oslo Sporveier. He retired in 1982. From 1963 to 1965 he was the president of Norske Sivilingeniørers Forening, an organization today known as Tekna.
