= Arne Espeland =

Norwegian writer

Arne Espeland (6 July 1885 – 22 April 1972) was a Norwegian writer.

He was born in Vanse Municipality on the Lista peninsula in southern Norway. He used local history as a theme for many of his books. Novels include Klar til batalje (1961) and Med livet i nevane (1964).
