= Anders Skauge =

Norwegian politician

Anders Skauge (18 October 1912 - 28 April 2000) was a Norwegian politician for the Liberal Party.

He served as a deputy representative to the Norwegian Parliament from Sør-Trøndelag during the term 1954–1957.
