= ITromsø =

Daily tabloid newspaper based in Norway

iTromsø
- Type: Daily newspaper
- Format: Tabloid (Compact)
- Owner: Polaris Media
- Editor: Trond Haakensen
- Founded: 1898
- Political alignment: None
- Language: Norwegian
- Headquarters: Tromsø, Norway
- Website: www.itromso.no

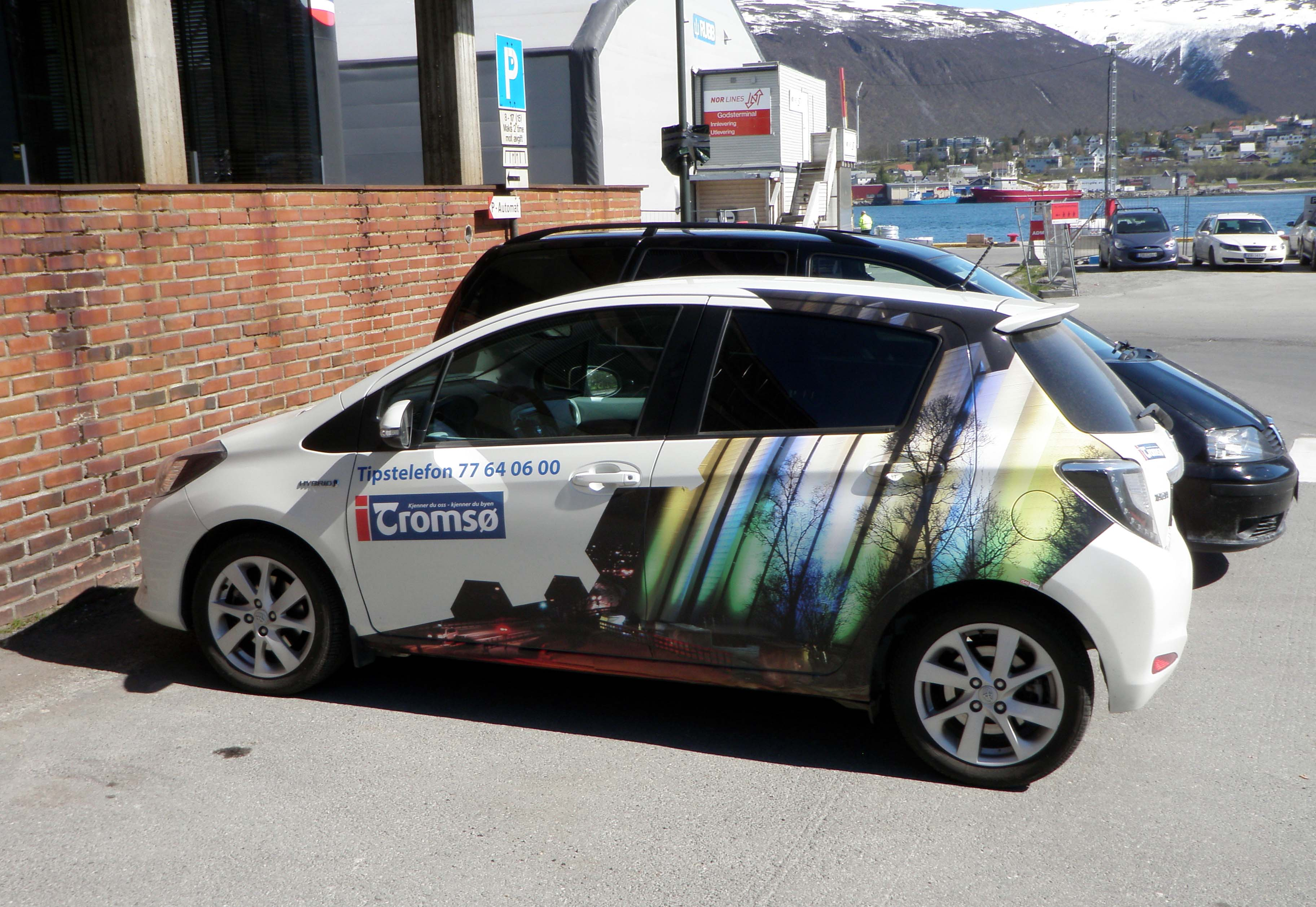
Car belonging to iTromsø

iTromsø (formerly Bladet Tromsø) is a daily (save for Sunday) newspaper published in Tromsø, Norway. Since 2 January 2026, the newspaper published issues on Tuesdays, Thursdays and Saturdays.

== History and profile ==
Bladet Tromsø was first published on 24 January 1898 with Ejnar Gjemsø as the first editor-in-chief. He was followed by Erling Steinbø in the post.

The newspaper initially supported the Liberal Party. Following the party split in 1972, it aligned with the new Liberal People's Party for a short time before declaring its support of the Conservative Party.

The newspaper was owned by the company which owns Verdens Gang from 1986 to 1992. It is now published by Mediehuset iTromsø A/S, a subsidiary of Polaris Media, which was earlier owned by the Schibsted Group. The editor-in-chief is Trond Haakensen.

In December 2009, the newspaper changed its name to iTromsø. As of 2009, it had a circulation of 9,500 copies.

== Editor in chief ==
- 1898 – 1898 Ejnar Gjemsø
- 1898 – 1912 Erling Steinbø
- 1912 – 1916 Anders Hamre
- 1916 – 1916 Sverre Melvær
- 1916 – 1917 Karl Sjurseth
- 1917 – 1917 Andreas Aas
- 1917 – 1917 Anders Hamre
- 1917 – 1961 Oscar Larsen
  - 1941 - 1943 Torgils Lovra (Installed by NS)
  - 1943 - 1944 Edvard Eriksen (Installed by NS)
  - 1944 - 1945 Peder Lind-Solstad (Installed by NS)
- 1961 – 1972 Kjell Larsen
- 1961 – 1982 Sverre Larsen
- 1972 – 1974 Wiggo Jentoft
- 1974 – 1980 Erlend Rian
- 1980 – 1985 Einar Sørensen
- 1985 – 1985 Kjell Larsen
- 1985 – 1986 Arnulf Hartviksen
- 1986 – 1990 Pål Stensaas
- 1990 – 1993 Per Eliassen
- 1994 – 2007 Yngve Nilssen
- 2007 - 2009 Jonny Hansen
- 2009 – 2014 Jørn Chr. Skoglund
- 2014 – 2015 Jonny Hansen
- 2015 – 2020 Stig Jakobsen
- 2020 – Trond Haakensen

== Lindberg case ==
Bladet Tromsø became internationally known in 1988 when they published an official report on seal hunting written by Odd F. Lindberg. The report received international attention and led to a discussion about the Norwegian seal hunt and freedom of speech. The newspaper was sued by the seal hunters and sentenced after two court rounds to pay compensation. In May 1999, the European Court of Human Rights in Strasbourg reversed the ruling of the Norwegian court, marking a change in the standards of publication.
