= Alf Gowart Olsen =

Norwegian ship owner and ship broker

- Born: 30 June 1912; Stavanger, Norway
- Died: 17 October 1972 (aged 60)
- Occupations: Ship owner and ship broker
- Awards: Order of the Dutch Lion

Alf Gowart Olsen (30 June 1912 – 17 October 1972) was a Norwegian ship owner and ship broker. He was born in Stavanger, Norway. He chaired the family shipping company Brødrene Olsen from 1932. He was a board member of several companies and foundations, including Det Stavangerske Dampskibsselskap, Stavanger Flint, Stavanger Maritime Museum and the Norwegian Shipowners' Association. He was decorated Knight of the Order of the Netherlands Lion.
