= Law of Denmark =

Law in Denmark follows a civil law system.

== Private law ==
Private law constitutes several different forms.

The Funktionærloven governs labour law concerning salaried employees. The Ferieloven governs vacation time for employees. The Købeloven governs consumer law. The Lejeloven governs landlord–tenant law. Privacy law in Denmark is important.

== Public law ==
There are several kinds of Public law in Denmark.

The Straffeloven is the criminal code.

The Planloven governs urban planning. The Serviceloven governs social programs.

There are laws about Abortion in Denmark and Danish nationality law.

Danefæ is the law stipulating that valuable objects discovered in Denmark that have no identifiable owner are the property of the state.

== History ==
The law of Denmark was originally based on regional laws, of which the most important was the Jyske Lov, or the Law of Jutland 1241. The Danske Lov, or the Danish Code of 1683, promoted unity. The law has been developed via judicial decisions and royal decrees. Roman law has not had much influence on the law of Denmark.

== See also ==
- Courts of Denmark
- Constitution of Denmark
