= Datatilsynet =

Datatilsynet may refer to:

- Danish Data Protection Agency
- Norwegian Data Protection Authority
