= Notice period =

Term in contract law and human resource management

A notice period or period of notice within a contract may be defined within the contract itself, or subject to a condition of reasonableness. In an employment contract, a notice period is a period between the receipt of the letter of dismissal and the end of the last working day. This time period does not have to be given to an employee by their employer before their employment ends. The term also refers to the period between a termination date or resignation date and the last working day in the company when an employee leaves or when a contract ends.

== Contractual provisions ==
A contract may state a period of notice which either/any party is required to give to the other contractual parties. The contract between Winter Garden Theatre (London) Ltd. and Millennium Productions Ltd., which gave rise to a 1948 legal case, stated that Millennium would have to give a month's notice if it wished to terminate, but Winter Garden's obligations were not stated. Lord MacDermott stated in that case that

The conclusion I reach is that in this contract there should be implied a stipulation to the effect that, ... the licence might be terminated by the licensors on the expiration of a reasonable notice period duly communicated to the licensees.

The duration of a reasonable notice period depends on the particular facts of a particular case. In the case of Jackson Distribution Ltd. v Tum Yeto Inc. (2009), a distribution arrangement had been established between these two companies but there was no formal written agreement. They had discussed a number of options in a series of e-mails, and draft agreements had passed between them. The High Court of England and Wales confirmed that the facts of the case and the type of contract in place would be relevant to determining the notice period applicable to terminating a contract, and that other relevant factors and any relevant trade practices could also be taken into account. A reasonable period has been judged to be 12 months in some cases, but shorter in others.

In English housing law, a Section 21 notice provides for a notice period at the end of which an assured shorthold tenancy will come to an end. In a legal case, Lower Street Properties v Jones, 1996, wording which stated that the notice period ran to "the end of the period of your tenancy which will end after the expiry of two months from service" of the notice was legally sufficient and clear because the end-date could be calculated even though it was not actually specified.

== Notice periods in employment law ==
=== Statutory redundancy notice periods in the UK ===
In the United Kingdom, the statutory redundancy notice periods are:

- at least one week's notice if employed between one month and two years
- one week's notice for each year if employed between two and twelve years
- twelve weeks' notice if employed for twelve years or more.

These statutory periods constitute the minimum notice period to be given by the employer; however, some employers may opt to give employees longer notice periods, in order to give the employees a better opportunity to find alternative employment. (Note: This section incorporates text copied from https://www.gov.uk/redundant-your-rights/notice-periods under the terms of the Open Government Licence 2.0.)

=== Notice periods in Poland ===
In Poland the same notice period applies regardless of which party (employer or employee) withdraws the contract. The statutory periods apply, unless both parties agree on other terms:

- 2 weeks if employed below 6 months
- 1 month if employed below 3 years
- 3 months if employed 3 or more years.

The week-measured period ends on Saturday. The month-measured period ends on the last day of calendar month—for instance, if 1-month period applies, a resignation or dismissal produced between 1st and 30 April results in contract termination on 31 May.

=== Notice periods in the United States ===
Because most employment in the U.S. is at-will, no notice period is required. In practice, most employees provide two weeks' notice.

=== Notice periods in Denmark ===
Notice periods for white collar workers are defined in the Danish Law on Salaried Employees or "Funktionærloven", which are:

- 1 month if employed below 6 months
- 3 months if employed below 3 years
- 4 months if employed below 6 years
- 5 months if employed below 9 years
- 6 months if employed more than 9 years.

If the employee resigns, he/she has to give a 1-month notice period.

=== Notice periods in Switzerland ===
Notice periods in Switzerland are governed by the Code of Obligations, which sets the default time scales. The notice period depends on the employee’s length of service within the company as follows:

- 7 days during the trial period
- 1 month if employed below 1 year
- 2 months if employed below 10 years
- 3 months if employed more than 10 years

The default trial period is the first month of employment, but may be extended up to three months. After the trial period, the notice period may be amended by a written contract, but not under one month, unless set by a collective labor agreement and only for the first year of employment.
