= Eugene Haynes =

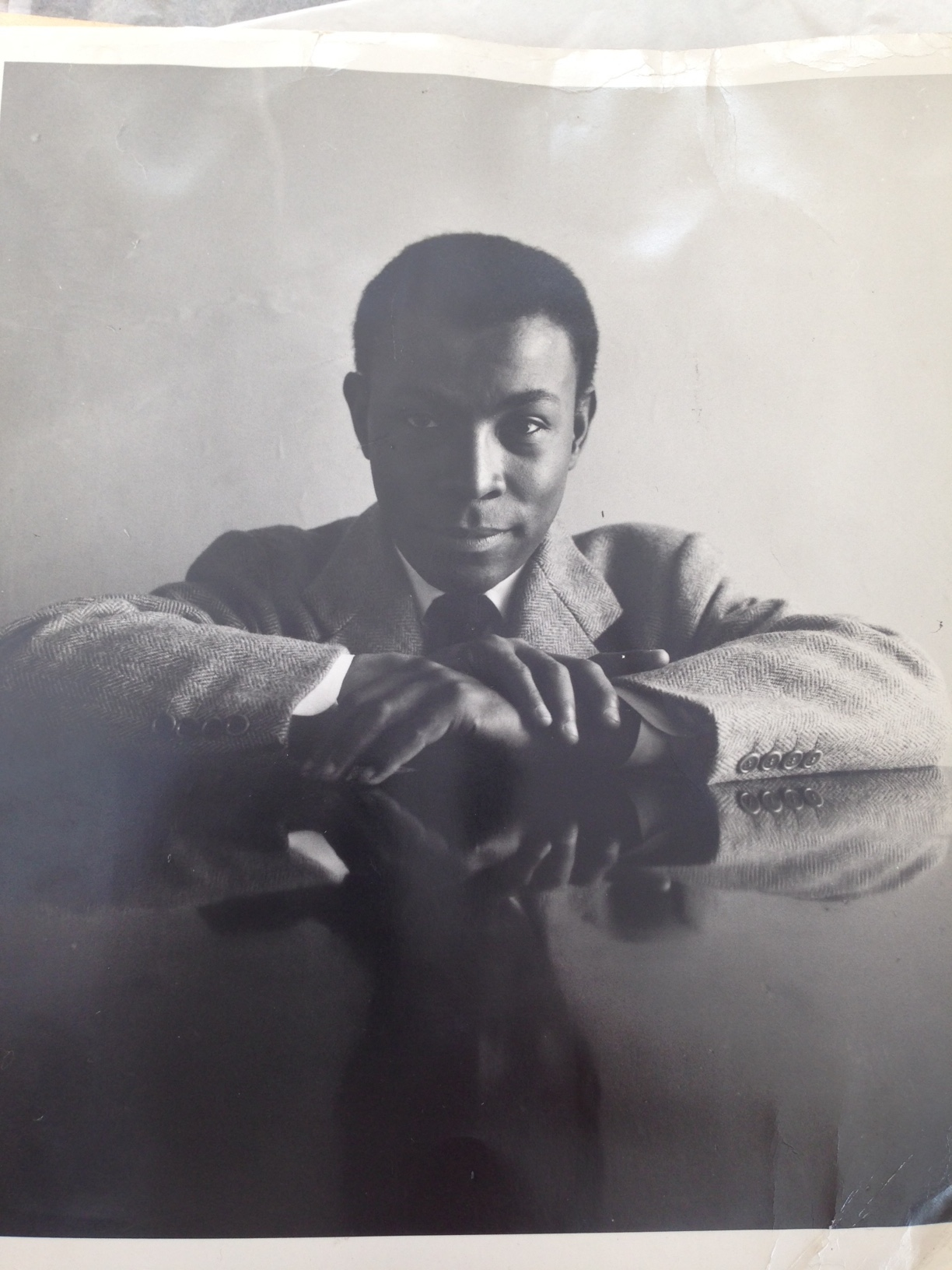
- Haynes at the piano ca 1957

Background information
- Birth name: Eugene Haynes Jr.
- Born: 1927; East St Louis, Illinois, USA
- Died: February 5, 2007 (aged 79–80)

Eugene Haynes (1927– 5 February 2007) was an American classical pianist, composer and music pedagogue. He graduated from Lincoln High School in 1944, where he played piano to classmate Miles Davis' trombone. He studied music at the Juilliard School in New York, and with Nadia Boulanger in Paris from 1951 to 1954. He worked as a radio presenter in East St Louis, Artist-in-residence at Lincoln University, and as leader of Centre for Performing Arts at University at Southern Illinois University. His first and only CD came out in 2004 and his life in Denmark was documented in a temporary exhibition at Museum Amager outside Copenhagen in 2012.

Haynes' time in Europe between 1952 and 1962 is the best documented period of his life and career. In 2000, he published a memoir titled To Soar With Eagles: The European Travels. Remembrances of Isak Dinesen documenting his many stays in Denmark during the 1950s and recounted his friendship with Karen Blixen.

== Early life and education ==
Eugene Haynes was born in 1927 in East St Louis, Illinois, USA. He started playing piano at the age of 4. As a teenager he worked in a warehouse and used his lunch breaks to play a piano nearby. His bosses discovered his talent by accident and decided to pay for his musical education. He joined Juilliard School of Music in New York and at the end of his studies he won the Morris Loeb prize for 'overall excellence in graduate studies'. After a brief period of study at Lincoln University in Missouri (a place he would return to) he continued his studies with the music pedagogue Nadia Boulanger in Paris from 1951 to 1954.

== In Europe in the 1950s ==
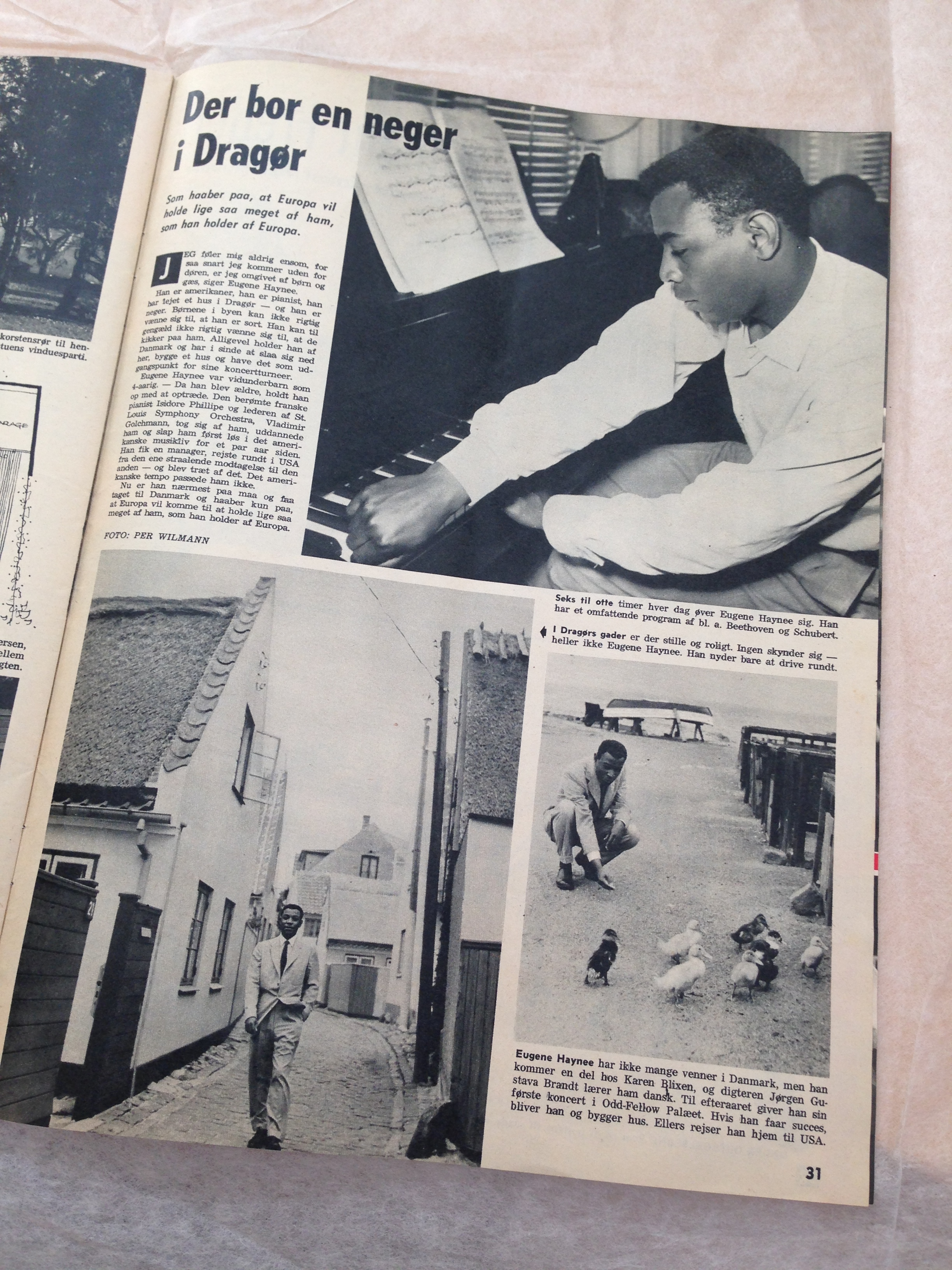
Article about Eugene Haynes in the Danish Billed Bladet, 26 July 1957

After his stay in Paris studying with Boulanger, Haynes continued seeking a breakthrough as a pianist. Sponsored by the USA Information Service he went on a concert tour in Europe. The Information service aimed to improve America's image abroad and to counter Eastern European political and cultural influence. Racial segregation and discrimination was a sensitive topic in the US, where the civil rights movement, formed half a century before, was about to gain new momentum. The Information Service tried to promote the US as a non-discriminating nation, and with Haynes, aimed to show that African Americans had opportunities in the US, even as classical pianists. At the time, the terms black and classical pianist may have seemed mutually exclusive. Classical music was a trade of artistic work almost solely reserved for whites; black musicians were more commonly known to play soul, jazz, and blues. The Information Service was also trying to sell a culture-rich nation—a USA which was more than just Hollywood, cartoons, and Coca-Cola— which has classical musicians just as talented as in Europe.

During the 1950s he stayed for extensive periods in Denmark, nurturing a close friendship with the writer Karen Blixen whom he met in 1952. He was introduced to the Danish writer Karen Blixen (also known by the pseudonym Isak Dinesen) by a Danish journalist, Bent Mohn, whom Haynes met during his studies in Paris. Haynes formed a friendship with Blixen and her secretary, Clara Selborn, from 1952 and over the next ten years until Blixen's death in 1962. Over many holidays and work trips in Denmark, he used Selborn's house in the small fishing village of Dragør, while Selborn stayed with Blixen in Rungstedlund, to practice the piano, study music, and in between, travel around Europe giving concerts.

He frequented not only Karen Blixen's home, Rungstedlund, but also hung out with locals like the Dragør-based poet, Jørgen Gustava Brandt, who Haynes described as "a real Casanova" in a letter to his brother. Gustava taught Haynes Danish, a language which he came to speak alongside French. When it came to music, critic Isador Phillip called Haynes "one of the greatest musical talents America has produced." Haynes could often be found in blue overalls and blue trainers among the geese of Dragør and occasionally hanging out with fishermen at the harbour. He recalled being renamed and assured by the local fishermen, saying: "From now on, your name is Hans. You are one of us."

=== Haynes' suitcase ===
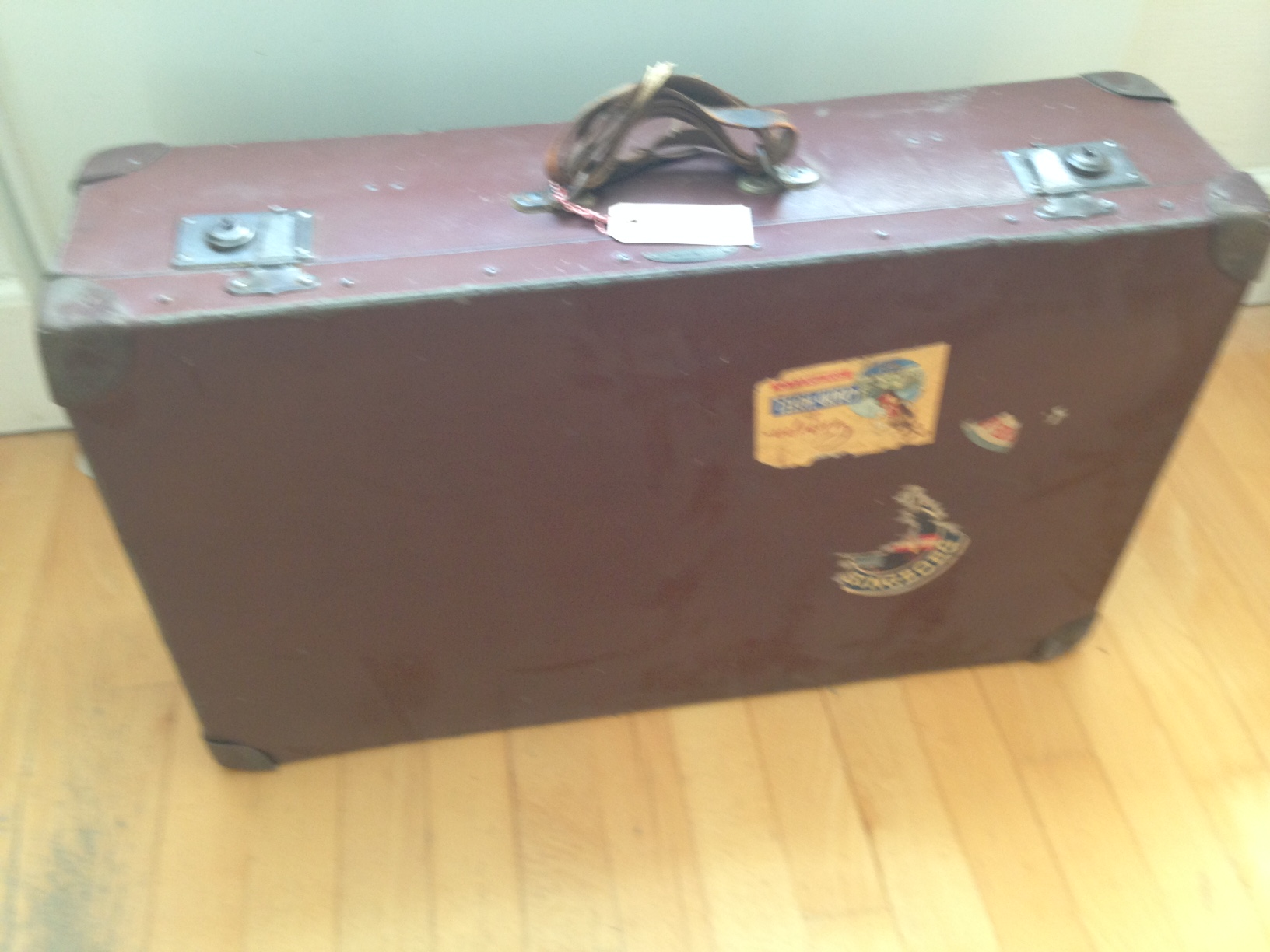
Eugene Haynes suitcase found in his friend, Clara Selborn's house, in Dragør, Denmark.

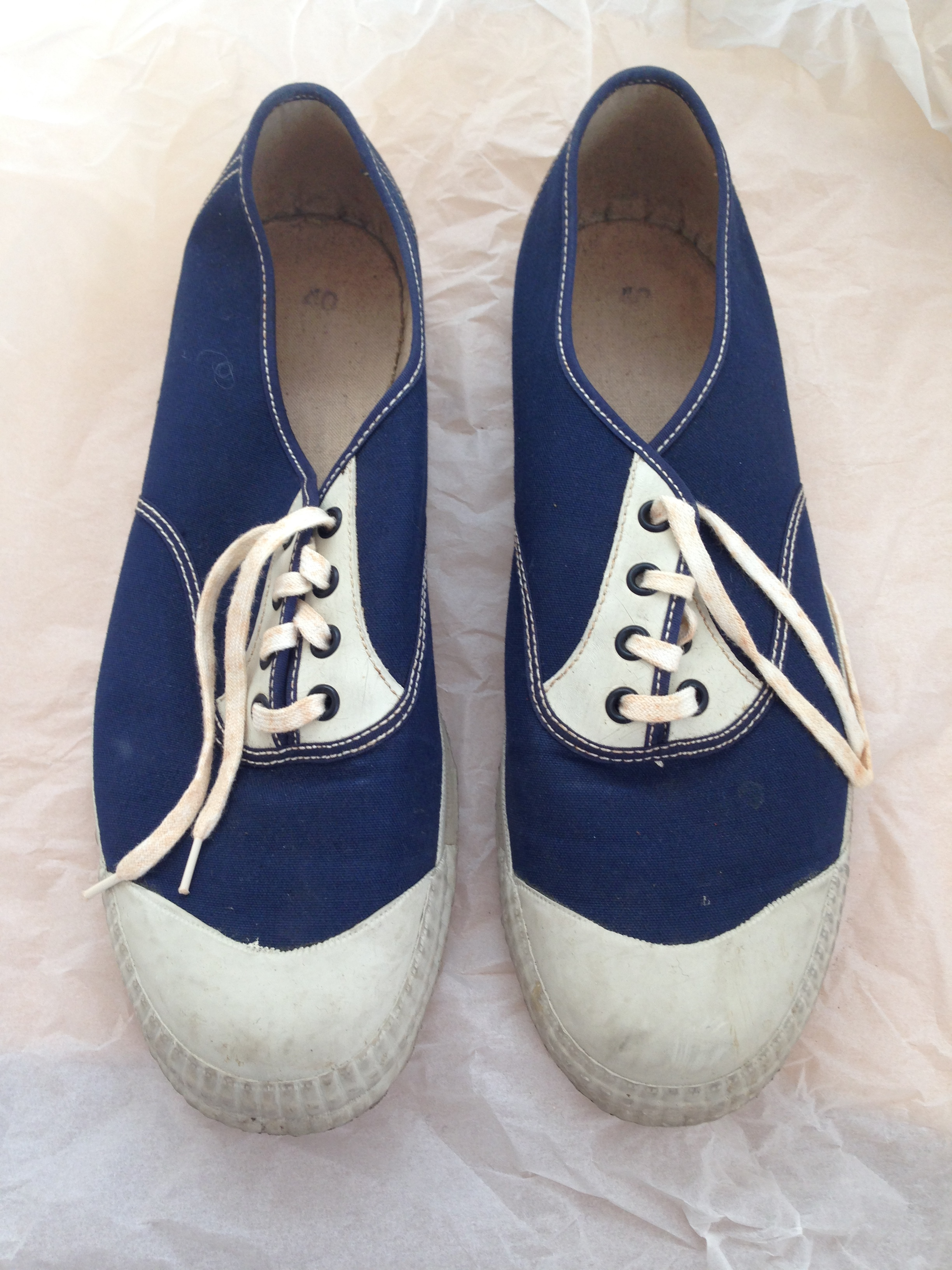
Eugene Haynes' blue shoes, possibly for strolling the narrow streets of Dragør, Denmark. From his suitcase at the Amager Museum collection.

A suitcase belonging to Haynes containing clothes and other objects was found at Clara Selborn's house in Dragør after her death in 2008. The contents of the suitcase was then turned into a temporary exhibition at the local Dragør Museum in 2012, along with other objects placed in a model of Selborn's house. The museum had five short films produced, narrated by curator Ingeborg Phillipsen, including: "The Pianist Eugene Haynes in Dragør, Denmark, and the World" (translated from Danish).

The suitcase contained ordinary everyday-use belongings, like shoes and trousers and a few books – as well as keepsake objects like dried flowers in a frame. Haynes apparently wore dark blue jeans overalls in Dragør. There are blue shoes, and a hat that, according to a 1957 article written in a popular gossip magazine, Billed Bladet, made him look like the local fishermen – and maybe the bohemians he hung out with as well, one could add. There are books, including a book on German grammar and an anthology of literature (with one text by Blixen). The case also contained two refined leather cases, a pipe instrument, various paper clips, and reviews as well as photos and PR material from his tours. A 1957 Billed Bladet magazine was included as well, featuring a Black American female tourist on the front, and an article with the headline: "Der bor en neger i Dragør" (English: There is a negro living in Dragør).

=== On Karen Blixen ===
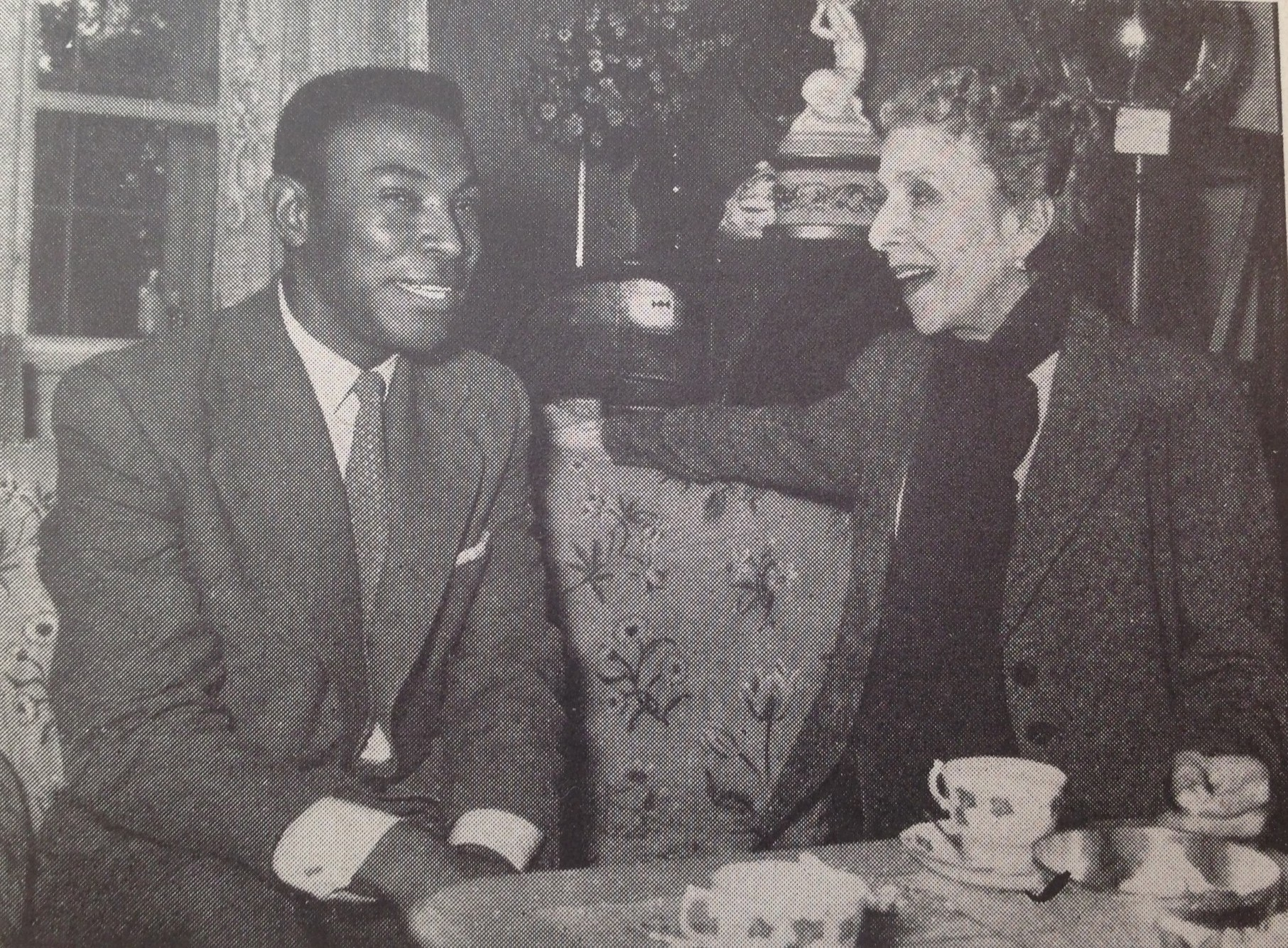
Eugene Haynes with Karen Blixen at her home in Rungstedlund, Denmark, ca. 1957

Haynes discussed the difficulties in making his break as a classical pianist in his diaries and letters, published in To Soar With Eagles in 2000. He wrote in one of his letters home that for his high school classmate and friend, the Black jazz musician Miles Davis, the situation was different. As Haynes said to him once in France, "He [Miles] was entering a world where no one would question his right to function. This is still far from true where black African instrumentalists are concerned [in the States] which is why I spend as much time away from home as possible". Haynes found Denmark open and hospitable, but he also encountered stereotypes and racism. A university professor from America visiting Blixen referred to "the accent of our nigras" while at the table, and Haynes describes the situation and his discomfort in detail. Blixen had not heard the remark, but detected something was wrong. When she later asked about what happened, she was "enraged" about the guest's behaviour after Haynes had explained.

Haynes wrote in his diary about his first meeting with Blixen: "I have seldom been so curious about anyone." He further writes of Blixen, "She was a lady of La Belle Époque, one of the last of the great femmes du monde ... Had she said she had dined at the Café Procope with Diderot and the Philosophes, I would have believed her". The letters and diary entires reveal the warmness of his friendship with Blixen. In a diary entry titled "First meeting" Haynes writes about a walk with Blixen: "Along the way she talked about the many discussions she and Finch-Hatton had had on music. I asked if she had the gramophone he gave her in Africa. She was happy to show it to me when we returned to the house... As we said good bye, I made a quip about being a 'bit of Africa sent out' to her".

Haynes further quotes Blixen, who told him, "You'll have to be patient while you grow into your grace". Haynes was a young man of around thirty and working to achieve recognition. Recognising their differences, she also grounded them in a shared experience: "In some ways we are both outsiders. I in Denmark, you in the land of your birth." Haynes reflects on his relationship with her: "When Karen Blixen is interested in what you are saying, she can fix you with an almost hypnotic gaze and you are then convinced that you are at that time the most important person she knows, and what you are saying is of great moment. It is her most endearing trait".

Nevertheless, there were many other much more enriching gatherings and conversations, and Haynes' delight in these meetings with Blixen shines through in his recounts. At a dinner in 1961, Blixen suggested a game where each guest is assigned a famous intellectual, writer, or actor/actress. Haynes had given Blixen the French philosopher, Voltaire, and a woman with the name Birthe got Casanova. Haynes reveals fragments of the discussion in the diaries: Casanova had insisted on superstition as necessary, whereas Voltaire had favoured to free men of the "monster of superstition," arguing that liberty and superstition could not go hand in hand".

== Later career in the United States ==
In between his stays and concerts in Europe, Haynes also performed in the US. He debuted at Carnegie Hall in 1958 and played there again in 1969. However, Haynes spent most of his career teaching and composing. He was the artist-in-residence from 1958 to 1974 at Lincoln University, where he had briefly studied. In 1974, he won a prize from the National Association of Negro Positions and also returned to St Louis to contribute to the education of young music talents in his childhood neighbourhood. From 1965 to 1973 he hosted a local AM radio show. In 1979 he became leader of a Centre for Performing Arts at Southern Illinois University in East St. Louis. Finally, a CD was released in 2004. He died in 2007 at the age of 80.
