= Og det var Danmark... =

Og det var Danmark... (And that was Denmark...) is a satirical Danish comic strip drawn by Morten Ingemann. The strip won Basserne's and Ekstra Bladet's comic strip hunt in 2004 and has since been featured on page 2 of Ekstra Bladet.
