= Planloven =

Law on planning (Danish: Lov om planlægning) popularly known as Planloven, is a 1992 Danish law which establishes the basic rules that public authorities shall follow when planning, including:

- the protection of the country's nature and environment through prevention of pollution
- to create and maintain valuable buildings
- to involve the public in planning

== Plan types ==
Planloven contains four different plan types:

- National directives
- Regional plans
- Municipality plans
- Local plans

The various plans are ranked so that a plan of a given type may not conflict with plans on a higher level. It is only the local plan that is binding for the individual landowners.
