= Ken B. Rasmussen =

Danish journalist, novelist and talk radio host (born 1966)

Ken B. Rasmussen (born 1966 in Denmark) is a Danish journalist, novelist and talk radio host.

== Career ==
He wrote the number-one bestseller da:Livet, det Forbandede, a novel which became the catalyst for the 2014 Se og Hør media scandal.

He lived for many years in the United States in Los Angeles, California, before returning to Denmark in 2005.

He is a columnist at B.T. newspaper and a talk radio host at da:Radio24syv.

== Bibliography ==
- Livet, det Forbandede (2014)
- Ond Jagt (2014)
- Blodigt Smil (2016)
- Flugt til Døden (2016)
- Når Mænd Hader (2016)
- Ove Verner Hansen – Ja Tak Til Livet (2016)
- Søn af Sandberg (2018)

== See also ==
- List of Danish writers
- List of journalists
- List of novelists
- List of people from Los Angeles
