= Henrik Qvortrup =

Danish journalist

Henrik Qvortrup (born 13 October 1963) is a Danish journalist, political commentator, and previous editor-in-chief of the weekly Danish tabloid magazine Se og Hør. In the 2014 Se og Hør media scandal, Henrik Qvortrup was sentenced to three months' unconditional imprisonment, one year's conditional imprisonment and 200 hours of community service.

In May 2021, he was named the new editor-in-chief of Ekstra Bladet a Danish daily tabloid, taking over in July.

In December 2021, Qvortrup and his girlfriend traveled to Thailand for the Christmas and New Years holidays, but he tested positive for coronavirus upon arrival and authorities hospitalized him against his will.
