= East St. Louis Lincoln High School =

High school in Illinois, US

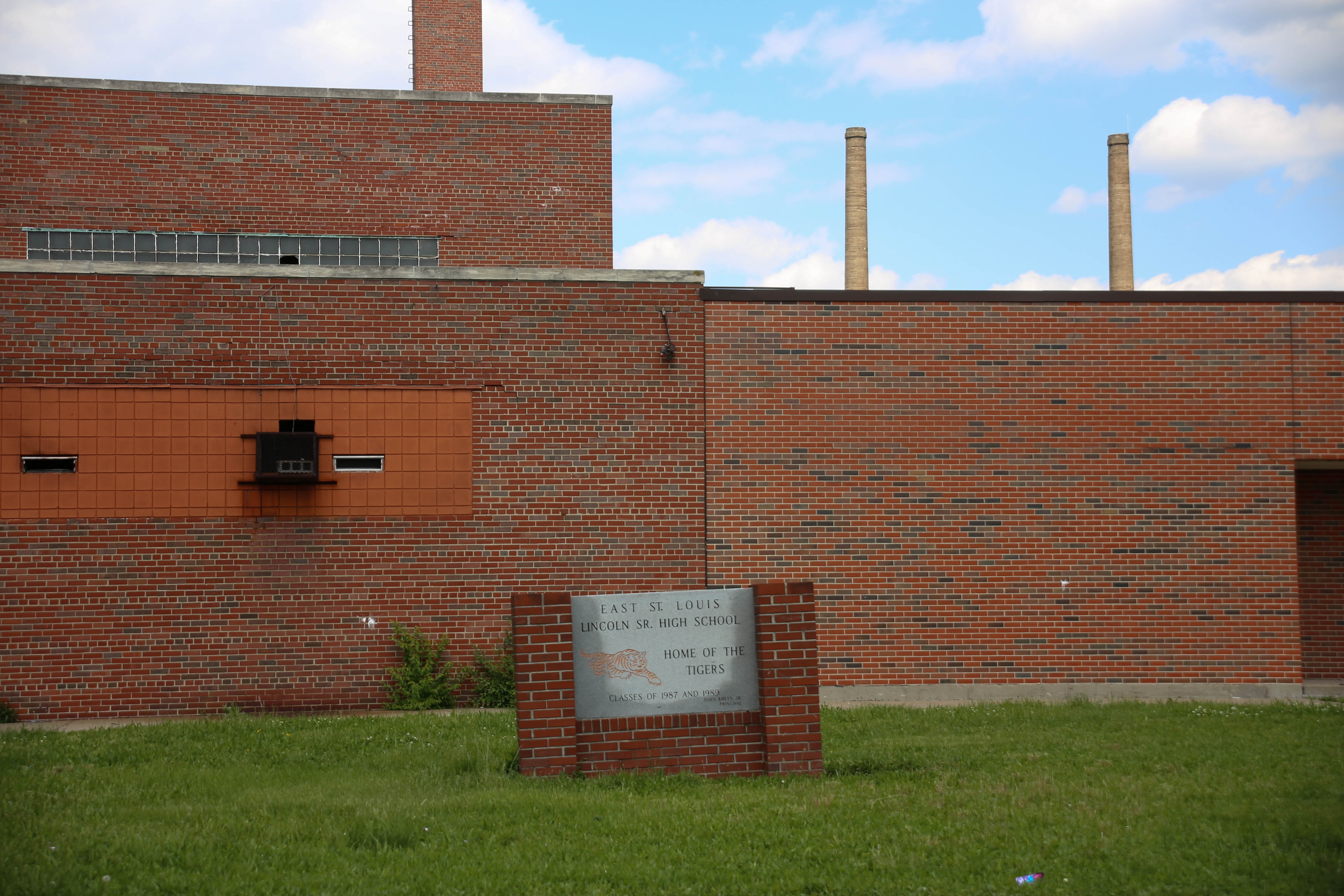
- East St. Louis Lincoln Senior High School, May 2014

Location
- 1211 Bond Avenue; East St. Louis, Illinois; United States
- 38°36′51″N 90°09′26″W

Information
- Type: Public high school
- Established: 1909
- Closed: 1998
- School district: East St. Louis School District 189
- Gender: Coed
- Campus type: Urban
- Colors: Orange and black
- Team name: Tigers, Tigerettes

East St. Louis Lincoln High School was a high school in East St. Louis, Illinois. It was established in 1909 as a school for blacks and consolidated with East St. Louis Senior High School in 1998.

== History ==
The first school in East St. Louis named for Abraham Lincoln was a 1st–12th-grade school for black children that opened in 1602 at Sixth Street and St. Louis Avenue. In 1909, during a period of rapid expansion in East St. Louis, this school was closed, with its building becoming the headquarters of the city board of education, and East St. Louis Lincoln High School opened as a high school for blacks at 1100 East Broadway. It was originally a junior-senior high school, but later became a senior high school. By the late 1940s, with black migration continuing and the school system in the city still effectively segregated, the school was so overcrowded that the auditorium, the library, the study hall, and the music room had all been converted into classrooms; the school board promised to build a second black high school but allocated insufficient money, prompting a sit-in in 1949 for equal facilities. In 1950 the school moved to a new building at 1211 Bond Avenue; in the early 1960s students began to be permitted to transfer to the predominantly white East St. Louis Senior High School if Lincoln did not offer the electives they wanted.

In 1998 it was consolidated with East St. Louis Senior High School; the building was used as a grade school for a few years after that, but was then abandoned.

== Athletics ==
The Lincoln Tigers and Tigerettes won 29 state championships in sports, 14 of them in girls' track and field within a 17-year period; the girls' track and field coach, Nino Fennoy, became the coach at East St. Louis Senior High School after consolidation, as did the boys' basketball coach, Bennie Lewis Sr., whose program dominated the state in the 1980s. The two schools had been traditional rivals, particularly in basketball.

== Notable alumni and staff ==
- Elwood Buchanan, music teacher
- Miles Davis, jazz musician
- LaPhonso Ellis, basketball player
- Terreon Gully, jazz drummer
- Eugene Haynes, pianist and composer
- Tina Hutchinson, basketball player
- Al Joyner, track and field athlete, gold medalist at 1984 Summer Olympics
- Jackie Joyner-Kersee, track and field athlete, winner of six Olympic medals and four world championships
- Cuonzo Martin, basketball player, head men's coach at Missouri State University
- Ted Savage, former Major League Baseball player
