= Elwood Buchanan =

Elwood C. Buchanan Sr.
- Born: Elwood C. Buchanan Sr. January 26, 1907; St. Louis, Missouri, United States
- Died: May 21, 1990 (aged 83) Saint Clair County, Illinois, United States
- Genres: Jazz
- Occupations: Teacher, trumpeter
- Instrument: Trumpet

Elwood C. Buchanan Sr (1907–1990) was an American jazz trumpeter and teacher who became an early mentor of Miles Davis.

Buchanan was born in St Louis, Missouri on January 26, 1907, and was trained in music by Joseph Gustat, the principal trumpeter with the St Louis Symphony Orchestra. He began his career playing in local dance bands, including Andy Kirk's orchestra, and on the riverboats that travelled on the Mississippi River between St Louis and New Orleans. During the late 1930s and early 1940s, he taught music and directed the band at Lincoln High School in East St Louis, and also visited the local elementary schools to give weekly lessons. Buchanan was known for his strict and demanding teaching style, and for encouraging pupils to compete with one another.

Buchanan was a patient of Miles Davis's father, who told him of his son's interest in music. Although Davis, at thirteen, was then too young to attend Buchanan's school, Buchanan began giving him private lessons. Davis joined the school band when he began attending Lincoln. Although Buchanan had the band play mainly marches rather than jazz, the techniques he taught profoundly affected Davis' jazz style. In particular, Buchanan went against the times by recommending to his students that they play without vibrato, and is said to have broken Davis of the habit by rapping his knuckles with a ruler and commanding: "Stop shakin' that note. You're going to shake enough when you get old". Buchanan also encouraged Davis to study the lean, relaxed playing of Bobby Hackett (then little known beyond the East Coast) and Harold Shorty Baker. In this, too, Buchanan went against fashion; the most popular trumpeter of the day was Louis Armstrong, whose hot playing style was very different from those of Hackett or Baker.

Davis later credited Buchanan with persuading his parents to buy him a new trumpet, rather than a violin as his mother had preferred. Buchanan also introduced Davis to Clark Terry, who would become his recording partner.

In his autobiography, Davis recalled: "Mr. Buchanan was the biggest influence on my life up until then. He was definitely the person who took me all the way into music at that time."

== Sources ==
- So What: The Life of Miles Davis by John Szwed (Simon & Schuster, 2002)
- Milestones: The Music and Times of Miles Davies by J.K. Chambers (Da Capo Press, 1998)
- Miles Davis: The Autobiography
- Clark Terry: Having Fun from All About Jazz.
