= Tina Hutchinson =

American basketball player (born 1964/1965)

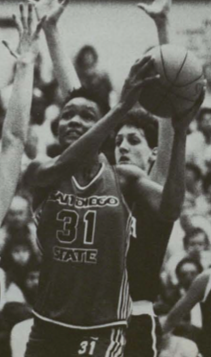
- Hutchinson with the San Diego State Aztecs in 1983–84

Personal information
- Born: 1964 or 1965 (age 59–60); Birmingham, Alabama, U.S.
- Listed height: 6 ft 3 in (1.91 m)

Career information
- High school: G. W. Carver (Birmingham, Alabama); East St. Louis Lincoln (East St. Louis, Illinois)
- College: San Diego State (1983–1985)
- Position: Forward

Career highlights and awards
- First-team All-WCAA (1984); Parade High School Player of the Year (1983); USA Today High School Player of the Year (1983)

Ida "Tina" Hutchinson (born 1964 or 1965) is an American former professional basketball player. She played two years of college basketball for the San Diego State Aztecs. Hutchinson led the Aztecs to their first NCAA tournament in 1984, when she set NCAA freshman records for highest scoring average and most total points in a season. She was also named first-team all-conference in the Western Collegiate Athletic Association (WCAA). Hutchinson left San Diego State after suffering a major knee injury in her sophomore year. Afterwards, she played pro ball in Europe.

== Early life ==
Hutchinson was born and raised for 15 years in Birmingham, Alabama. She grew up with her mother and grandmother, but without her father or any father figure. She learned to play basketball from her uncle. The summer after her freshman year at Carver High School, Hutchinson attended a basketball camp in Georgia, and developed a relationship with one of the instructors, Earnest Riggins, who was the head coach at East St. Louis Lincoln High School. His team had won the Illinois state championship the prior season. A month after the camp, Hutchinson called Riggins to inquire about playing for his team. She wanted to be the best girls player in the country, but did not believe she would receive the recognition in Birmingham, which was known for boys basketball.

Hutchinson moved to East St. Louis, initially living with an ailing aunt before moving in with Riggins after he became her legal guardian. Playing at Lincoln under Riggins, Hutchinson scored 2,000 points in her career in Illinois (1980–1983). As a senior in 1983, she set the Class AA girls state tournament single-game scoring record with 41 points. For the season, she averaged 37.2 points and 15.1 rebounds and made an excellent 78 percent of her field goals. Parade and USA Today named her the top girls high school player in the nation, and she was placed on Parade's All-America first team. Hutchinson—who also played volleyball, high jumped, and threw the discus—scored over 3,000 points in her four-year basketball career.

Hutchinson was inducted into the Illinois High School Basketball Hall of Fame and Museum and Illinois Basketball Coaches Association Hall of Fame.

== College career ==
Recruited by most major colleges, Hutchinson narrowed her choices to San Diego State, UCLA, and Louisiana Tech. She opted to attend San Diego State University, where Riggins had recently been hired as the new coach. He stated that he did not promise a package during his hiring. "My decision to come here was mine, her decision was hers", he said.

Hutchinson and Riggins, along with their Lincoln High teammates Toni Wallace and Mesie Jointer, joined an Aztecs program that went 10–18 the prior year. As a freshman in 1983–84, the 6-foot-3-inch (1.91 m) Hutchinson averaged 29.9 points per game, an NCAA Division I freshman scoring record. She added 10 rebounds and 6.2 steals per game, while starting in 29 of 30 games as a forward. Her 898 total points stood as a Division I freshman record for four decades until it was broken by JuJu Watkins (920) in 2024. The second-leading scorer in the country, Hutchinson was named a second-team All-American by the Shreveport Journal, and was voted their "Outstanding Freshman". She was also named Freshman of the Year by Women's Varsity Sports Magazine and Women's Basketball Yearbook. Hutchinson was a first-team all-conference selection in the WCAA, receiving the second-most votes behind Cheryl Miller of the USC Trojans. She set the Aztecs single-game scoring record with 46 points against Cal State Fullerton, including 35 in the second half. In the first of two matchups against the Trojans' Miller, Hutchinson had 41 points and five steals on the road compared to Miller's 36 points, 17 rebounds and six assists. In their rematch in a sold-out Peterson Gym at San Diego State, Hutchinson outscored Miller 29–28. The Aztecs lost both times to the eventual national champion USC. The Aztecs finished the season 24–6, and were selected for the 1984 NCAA tournament, the first NCAA tournament invite in the program's history.

In 1984–85, Hutchinson was named a preseason All-American by Street & Smith; however, she underwent multiple knee surgeries during the season. She injured her left knee against Southern Illinois while chasing Petra Jackson on a breakaway in December 1984. Days later on December 19, Hutchinson had arthroscopic surgery to remove torn ligaments, and was expected to be out for three to four weeks. She returned on January 4, 1985, missing just four games. She scored 26 points in 19 minutes off the bench in a 112–37 blowout win over Hardin-Simmons. Over the next two months, Hutchinson was in and out of the lineup. She reinjured her knee on February 23 against USC, limiting her to 12 points in 19 minutes in a 90–77 loss to the Trojans. She required reconstructive surgery in March, and was expected to be sidelined for 9–12 months while recovering. Hutchinson played in 21 games during the season, averaging a team-leading 17 points per game while playing only 18 minutes per contest. She was named a third-team All-American by the Shreveport Journal.

After failing classes in the 1985 spring semester, Hutchinson was academically ineligible for the fall semester, and dropped out of San Diego State. She likely would have missed the 1985–86 season as a redshirt due to her injury. She spent a year in junior college at Palomar College in San Marcos, California, leaving in spring 1986 to play professionally.

== Professional career ==
Hutchinson played professionally in Europe, including Italy and Switzerland.

== U.S. national team ==
Hutchinson was not permitted to participate in the trials for the 1984 Olympics. According to the Amateur Basketball Association of the United States of America (ABAUSA, now USA Basketball), she did not submit her letter of intent by February 15, 1984. Her application would have been required by mid-March. They said that the letter of intent was mailed to Hutchinson on October 25, 1983, with a carbon copy sent to Riggins. He said they did not receive the mail, and did not learn about the forms until after the February deadline. He contacted ABAUSA in mid-March, but their stories differ about their call. ABAUSA said that Riggins said he had forgotten about the application, and asked where to send it. However, Riggins said he did not receive any mail, and called to ask how Hutchinson could get qualified. He appealed the case, but it was rejected by ABAUSA.

Previously, Hutchinson was on the U.S. junior national team that competed in Cuba in 1981. She participated in the National Sports Festival (later known as the U.S. Olympic Festival) in 1983, where she was the leading scorer and named to the all-tournament team. She accepted an invitation to trials for the 1983 Pan American Games, but backed out on the day she was due to arrive in camp because she could not afford the trip from Birmingham to Colorado Springs, Colorado.

== See also ==
- USA Today Girls' Basketball Player of the Year
