= George Washington Carver High School (Birmingham, Alabama) =

Location
- 3900 24th Street North; Birmingham, Alabama 35207; United States
- 33°33′29″N 86°49′36″W

Information
- School type: Public
- Motto: Excellence is the Standard
- Established: 1959 (67 years ago)
- School district: Birmingham City Schools
- CEEB code: 012487
- Principal: Evelyn L. Hines
- Teaching staff: 38.00 (FTE)
- Grades: 9-12
- Enrollment: 544 (2023-2024)
- Student to teacher ratio: 14.32
- Colors: Blue, red, and white
- Nickname: Rams
- Website: www.bhamcityschools.org/o/chs

George Washington Carver High School is a four-year public high school in Birmingham, Alabama. It is one of seven high schools in the Birmingham City School System and is named for the American botanist and inventor, George Washington Carver.

== History ==
Carver's current campus was completed in 2001 on a site that was formerly the North Birmingham Golf Course. It was Birmingham City Schools' first new high school in three decades and cost an estimated $44.5 million.

== Athletics ==
Carver competes in AHSAA Class 5A athletics and currently fields teams in the following sports:

- Baseball
- Basketball
- Cheerleading
- Football
- Outdoor track and field
- Soccer
- Softball
- Swimming
- Volleyball
- Wrestling

Carver has won three state championships:

- Boys' basketball (1978)
- Boys' track and field (1969)
- Girls' track and field (1993)

== Notable alumni ==
- Issiac Holt, National Football League (NFL) defensive back
- Tina Hutchinson, professional basketball player
