= Lejeloven =

Lejeloven, formally Lov om leje, is a Danish law which governs rentals of residential tenancies in private rented accommodation, including single-family homes, condominiums, so-called mixed properties and club premises. The law therefore does not apply to public housing or to commercial leases.

The law is intended to protect the tenant, by, among other provisions, limiting how much a landlord may ask in rent; in addition, the rent must be proportionate to the value of the premises. The law also states that a maximum of three months' rent may be required as a deposit, and that there is to be a separate accounting for heating, and finally the law sets out the rules which apply with respect to maintenance and expenditures incurred in connection with improvements.

The Act is subject to periodic review and was last revised on 1 July 2015.

Public rental housing is governed by the so-called M ordningen, for miksordningen or mellemtingsordningen (mixed or temporary system).
