= Danish Social Service Law =

The Danish Social Service Law, Serviceloven, properly Lov om social service, is a Danish law which specifies guidelines for advice and support both in order to prevent social problems and to provide services to people with physical or mental disabilities or particular social problems.

The first version of the law was passed in 1998, but it is typically revised several times a year, as of 19 June 2014 most recently on 10 June 2014.
