= Danish Vacation Law =

Danish law regulating holiday time for employees

The Danish Holiday Act (Danish: 'Ferieloven') is a Danish law regulating holiday time for employees. The act states how many days of paid holiday most employees in Denmark are legally entitled to. The law covers employees who receive wages for work performed in compliance with an employer, not including freelancers and employees working for the state. A new law was passed on 25 January 2018 by the Danish Parliament. It consists of a new concept of concurrent holidays and includes a transition period from 1 September 2019 – 31 August 2020 before being implemented on 1 September 2020. The concept of concurrent holidays allows employees to earn 2.08 holiday days each month, which they have access to use immediately, as opposed to the old scheme where workers earned holiday days for the following year.

== Danish Law ==
The Danish Holiday Act is administered by the Agency for Retention and Recruitment (Styrelsen for Fastholdelse og Rekruttering), which is part of the Ministry of Labour (Danish: 'Beskæftigelsesministeriet') and by a range of other authorities, including the holiday pay scheme, FerieKonto. A number of the provisions of the act may be waived under collective bargaining. The agency supports the Minister for Employment and the Danish Parliament with employment-related decisions that impact both citizens and businesses. The agency was founded in January 2014 to replace and combine two former agencies, The Labour Market Agency (Arbejdsmarkedsstyrelsen) and The Agency for Retention and Recruitment (Styrelsen for Fastholdelse og Rekruttering). The agency deals with employment decisions locally, regionally and nationally. The agency is split into 15 different offices, all focusing on different aspects of their overall responsibilities.

=== Relation to EU ===
Denmark has been a member of the European Union since 1973. Countries part of the EU are legally required to implement EU law in national law. This includes holiday time and other aspects, like maternity leave, parental leave, sick leave, other leave etc. The European commission deals with adapting and adopting new laws, in which anyone affected by the law can contribute to. After new laws are implemented, a commission ensures that all members are abiding by these policies. If countries fail to comply within a deadline set by the commission, infringement procedures may commence. The law in Denmark implements part of European Union directive 93/104/EC of 1993, for example Article 7, which states:

Member States shall take the measures necessary to ensure that every worker is entitled to paid annual leave of at least four weeks in accordance with the conditions for entitlement to, and granting of, such leave laid down by national legislation and/or practice.

== History ==
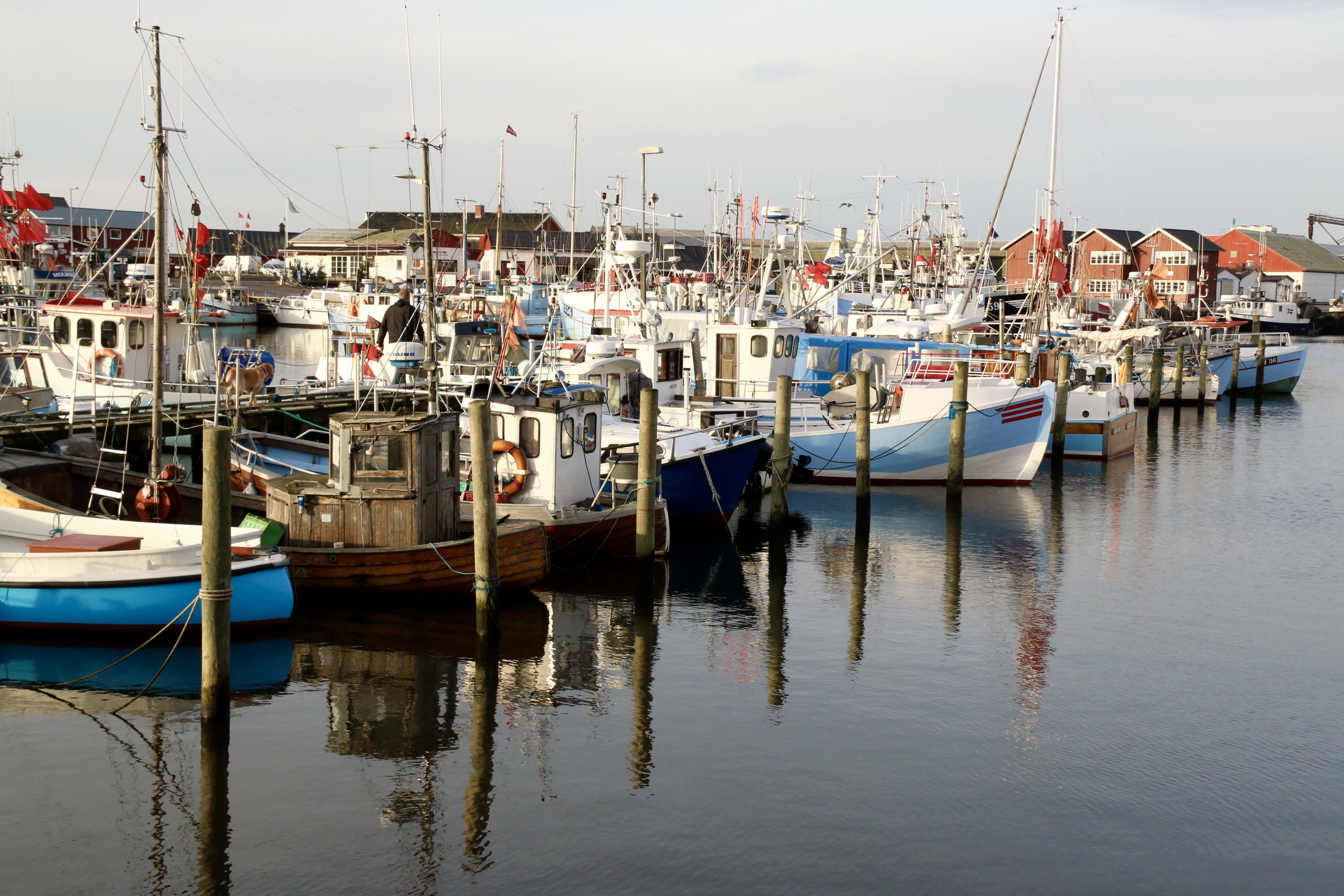
Gilleleje, Denmark

The Holiday Act was established on 13 April 1938, giving workers' the right to two weeks of paid holiday. The law progressed into the creation of the organisation, 'People's Holiday' (Danish: 'Folkeferie'), which was created to support and provide holiday opportunities for workers. Employees were granted holidays, so this organization was established to ensure they had somewhere to take them. They developed holiday towns (Esbjerg, Gilleleje, Middlefart, Karrebæksminde, Marielyst) and constructed hotels throughout several cities in Denmark. The establishment of the law and the People's Holiday organization meant that workers received time off and pay, which could both be spent at various holiday destinations throughout Denmark. By 1979, paid holiday days had increased to five weeks.

The most recent amendment to the act was to comply with the European Union legislation. The Danish Parliament formulated the amendments in 2018, to be set into action in 2020, which included the implementation of a transitional arrangement commencing in 2019. The previous law did not conform to international standards because not all workers in Denmark received five weeks of paid holiday. Under the previous regulation, workers earned holiday days for the succeeding holiday year. Inconsistent with EU legislation, employees new to the Danish working market, did not have any earned days of holiday to take their first year of employment.

== Concurrent Holidays ==
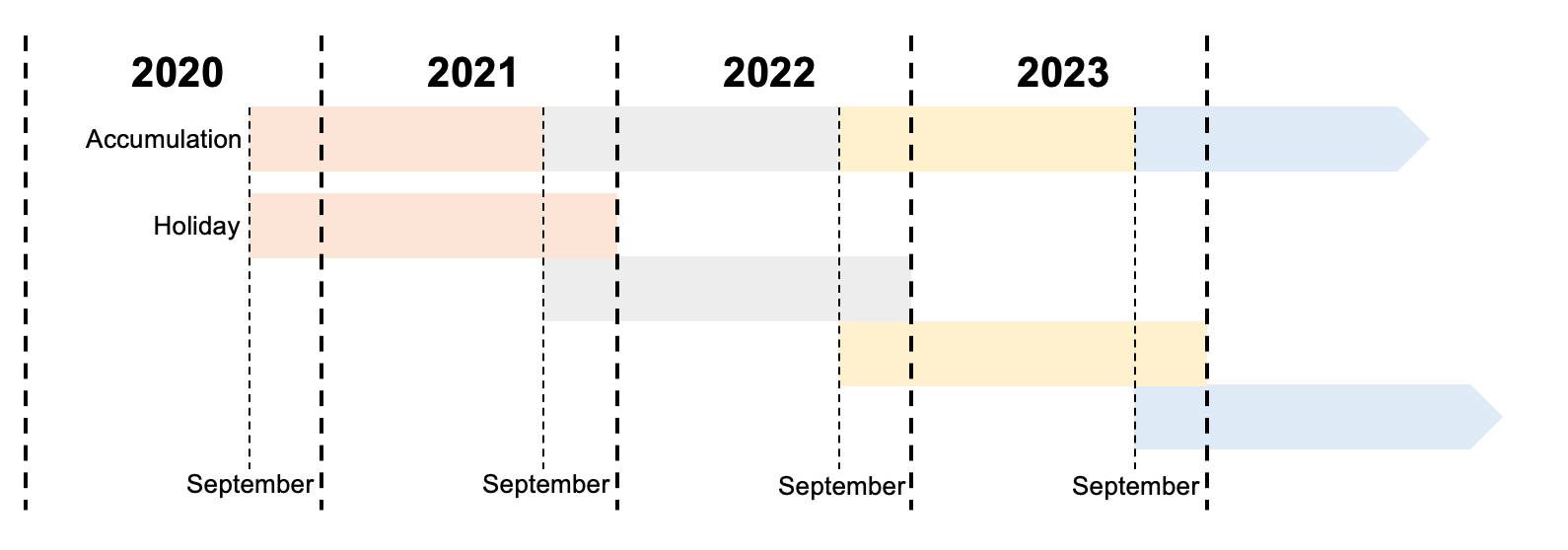
Concurrent Holiday Scheme Denmark

As of 1 September 2020, the holiday scheme in Denmark will conform to the concept of concurrent holidays. Employees in Denmark will accumulate 2.08 days of paid holiday each month (a total of five weeks each year) which, authorized by the new amendment, can be used immediately. Employees will accumulate holiday days over 12 months (1 September – 31 August) and have 16 months (1 September – 31 December) to use at least four weeks of them. Employees should use fifteen days consecutively, equivalent to a three-week holiday during the main holiday period (Danish: 'hovedferieperioden') from 1 May till 30 September.

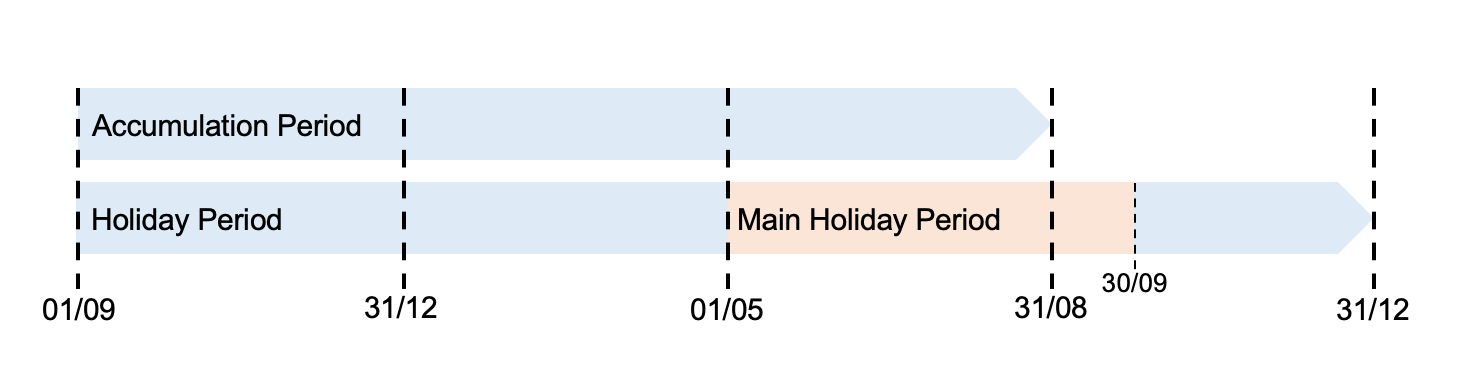
Denmark Holiday Act

Under the legislation, employees can decide to trade their holiday days for pay. This is allowed if in agreed upon with their employer and relates only to the fifth and additional sixth week (Danish: 'feriefridage') of holiday (which is not covered by the Holiday Act). If the employee meets the required guidelines, in terms of the amount and where the money stems from, they can trade their holiday days for pay at the end of the holiday year by filling out a form on the governmental website, Borger.dk. Specific rules and procedures are typically found in the employment contracts or company handbooks.

== Holiday Pay ==
The Danish Holiday Act enables employees to receive a wage during their five-week holiday. Employees either receive no deductions in pay when they are on holiday (paid holiday) or 12.5% of their annual pay (holiday allowance or Danish: 'feriepenge'). Employees on paid holiday, receiving their normal income, also receive an additional bonus (Danish: 'ferietillæg') of 1% of their income. These employees can choose to receive holiday allowance instead, at a rate of 12% of their annual pay without any bonus.

Holiday allowance is transferred to employees via different funds (e.g. FerieKonto or Feriepengeinfo) or directly from the employer. Employers make regular payments into the employees' holiday account through the fund. The fund then distributes the money once the employee has applied for their allowance. This is done at least one month prior to their holiday via the government website, Borger.dk. The earliest they receive their allowance from the fund is 1 May and one month before their holiday.

If the employee resigns or is dismissed, they are still entitled to their accumulated holiday days and holiday pay. Paid holiday employees will receive their payment from the fund by applying via the government website, Borger.dk.

== Transition Period ==
To implement the new holiday scheme, a transition period (1 September 2019 – 31 August 2020) was imposed. This was to ensure that employees do not accumulate double the amount of holiday days during the switch. The holidays earned throughout the transition period by employees will be kept in a new fund (Lønmodtagernes Dyrtidsfond) and disbursed once the employee leaves the labour market. This includes retirement, death, early retirement and leaving Denmark.

The holiday period will commence 1 May 2020 until 31 August 2020 during the transition period, and the 16.64 days obtained from 1 January 2019 to 31 August 2019 can be claimed then. Any holiday days not used will be carried over to the new scheme.

=== Employees new to the working market during the transition period ===
Employers entering the labour market during the transition period are eligible for 'fund holidays' (Danish: 'fondsferiefridage') if they meet below prerequisites:

- They have accumulated less than 8.3 paid days of holiday from 1 January 2019 until 31 August 2019;
- Have received wage from 1 September 2019 to 31 December 2019

The 'fund holidays' allow those employers access to 8.3 paid holiday days in addition to their accumulated holiday, which can be used during the holiday period in the transition phase (1 May 2020 – 31 August 2020). The additional fund holiday allowances are disbursed from the new fund (Lønmodtagernes Dyrtidsfond) in the holiday period rather than with retirement.

== Employment Termination ==
Employees terminating their employment contract need to inform their employer prior. The time of notice depends on how long they worked for the company. The employer is required to pay the holiday money for the vacation days not used before the employee stops permanently. Employees terminating their contract are only allowed to spend 25 days of holiday during the holiday year. Any transferred days of holiday will need to be disbursed as payment before the employee leaves the job.

If the employee terminates their employment contract due to retirement, they can receive all of their accumulated holiday as payment if they additionally receive pension from the state (not including early pension (Danish: 'efterløn')). If the employee receives holiday pay, the employer can disburse the accumulated holiday money directly. If the employee works during their retirement, they need to use their holiday days in order to get their holiday money.

== Prevented From Taking Holiday ==
=== Sick before the holiday ===
If the employee becomes ill before they start their holiday, they are required to inform their employer of their situation immediately. The days spent sick on their holiday can be used at a later stage. If the employee recovers throughout the holiday, they can decide to come back to work (and use the whole holiday later) or use the remainder of their holiday days. They should update their employer with their decision. If their employer requests a medical certificate and the employee became sick before their holiday, the employer is liable for the costs.

=== Sick during the holiday ===
Employees that fall ill during their holiday can receive five replacement holiday days per year if they meet the following criteria:

- informed their employer of their illness;
- they have a medical certificate, obtained at their expense;
- they have been ill for more than five holiday days throughout the year.

Any replacement holiday days not used within the holiday period will be transferred to the following year.

=== Maternity, paternity or adoption leave ===
Employees on maternity, paternity or adoption leave accumulate holiday days if they receive wages from their employer on the leave and they are not getting maternity unemployment benefits from the state. They are not allowed to take a holiday during their leave. Employees prevented from taking their holiday due to their leave, can receive their accumulated holiday as payment or transfer their holiday days to the following holiday period if in agreement with their employer.

=== Moving abroad ===
If the employee moves abroad, terminating the employment contract in Denmark, they can receive their accumulated holiday days as payment. If the employee continues to work for their Danish corporation under the Danish Holiday Act, they will not receive their holiday days as a payment. The Faroe Islands and Greenland are not covered by the Danish Holiday Act, and therefore, Danish employees moving there to work will get their holiday disbursed as payment.

=== Other reasons ===
- Self-employed
- Position of trust (i.e. mayor or minister)
- In prison or another closed institution
- Involved in legal employment conflict
- Completing military services
- In dispute about holiday allowance and filed a claim
- Leave of absence to care for a sick or dying relative
- 'Stay-at-home' position

If the employee is prevented from taking their holiday due to any of the above reasons, they can get their holiday days paid out. If the employee was prevented from taking their main holiday (three weeks between 1 May and 30 September), they can receive up to three weeks of holiday as payment. If the employee was prevented from taking their full holiday, they can receive their full holiday as payment. Employees need to apply to have their holiday disbursed as payment via the government website, Borger.dk.

== Additional Sixth Week (Feriefridage) ==
Depending on occupation and whether an employee is working for the public or private sector, some workers receive an additional sixth week of paid holiday (Danish: 'feriefridage'). This is not included in the Danish Holiday Act but rather is part of the workers' employment contract. People employed full time by the state or municipality (public sector) receive the sixth week of paid holiday. They have the option to use the days of holiday, have them transferred to the next holiday year or have their holiday pay paid out. Employment contracts state the terms and formalities, including when notice is required before going on holiday, and whether the employer can decline the requested holiday, etc.

== Public Holidays ==
Employees do not have to work on public holidays in Denmark unless otherwise stated in their contract. This refers to holidays that occur throughout the working week, Monday to Friday. If the public holiday falls on a non-working day (weekend), it is not moved to the next working day, and employees do not receive any time off for the holiday. The following occasions are classified as public holidays in Denmark:

- New Year's Day
- Maundy Thursday (Danish: 'Skærtorsdag')
- Good Friday (Danish: 'Langfredag')
- Easter Monday (Danish: '2. Påskedag')
- Great Prayer Day (Danish: 'St. Bededag')
- Ascension Day (Danish: 'Kristi Himmelfart')
- Whit Monday (Danish: '2. Pinsedag')
- Christmas Day (Danish: '1. Juledag')
- Boxing Day (Danish: '2. Juledag')

Holiday or half days may also be given by different industries for the following days, not classified as national holidays but celebrated nationally:

- 1 May
- Constitution Day (Danish: 'Grundlovsdag')
- Christmas Eve

Employees typically do not receive holiday allowance on public holidays unless otherwise stated in their employment contract.
