= Danish Law on Salaried Employees =

The Law on Salaried Employees (Danish: Funktionærloven), properly Lov om retsforholdet mellem arbejdsgivere og funktionærer (law on the legal relationship between employers and salaried employees), is a Danish law which gives salaried employees certain rights with regard to termination, vacation, illness, non-solicitation and non-competition clauses, etc.

The first version of the law was adopted in 1938; it was last revised in 2017. The Act is not a general employment law, because it applies only to certain occupational groups—those defined under Danish law as salaried.

The core group consists of employees engaged in clerical work, trade (for example, shop assistants), inventory processing, technical or clinical work (for example, engineers, nurses and doctors), management, etc.

== Exceptions and exclusions ==
Employees who are eligible for retirement income or an "old-age pension" are an exception to this law; no severance pay is required. The law is not retroactive in such a situation.

Executives who are not subject to supervision, for example, CEOs, are not covered by the law.

In principle, the Act is not applicable to employees engaged in craft or factory work, agriculture, fishery, waiting tables, kitchen work, etc. However, although many sectors of employment are not immediately subject to the law, the law nonetheless applies to a portion of such sectors through employment contracts or union agreements which provide that the law is to apply (for example, auxiliary nurses, educators, social and health care assistants, and Folkeskole teachers). In Denmark, these are sometimes referred to as aftalefunktionærer (contract salaried employees) as opposed to lovfunktionærer (legal salaried employees), to whom the law automatically applies. Finally, some occupational groups in principle covered by the Act, by virtue of agreements derogating from the law have a legal status which is better or worse than is provided for under the Act.

== Minimum requirements ==
There is a requirement for the law to be applicable that the employee works at least 8 hours a week on average, and also a requirement that the employee is not a civil servant.

The regulations concerning termination of employment under the Act establish a system of notices of termination based on the employee's length of service, which cannot be derogated from to the detriment of the employee. There is also the possibility of compensation in certain cases. At minimum, the employee will receive 1 month severance, provided they have passed the initial "probationary" period. After six months, the severance will be 3 months, etc.

The regulations concerning non-solicitation and non-competition clauses under the Act entitle the employee to compensation amounting to half pay during the period after leaving the job during which the employee is covered by such clauses.

== See also ==
- White-collar worker
