= Ekstra Bladet =

Danish tabloid newspaper

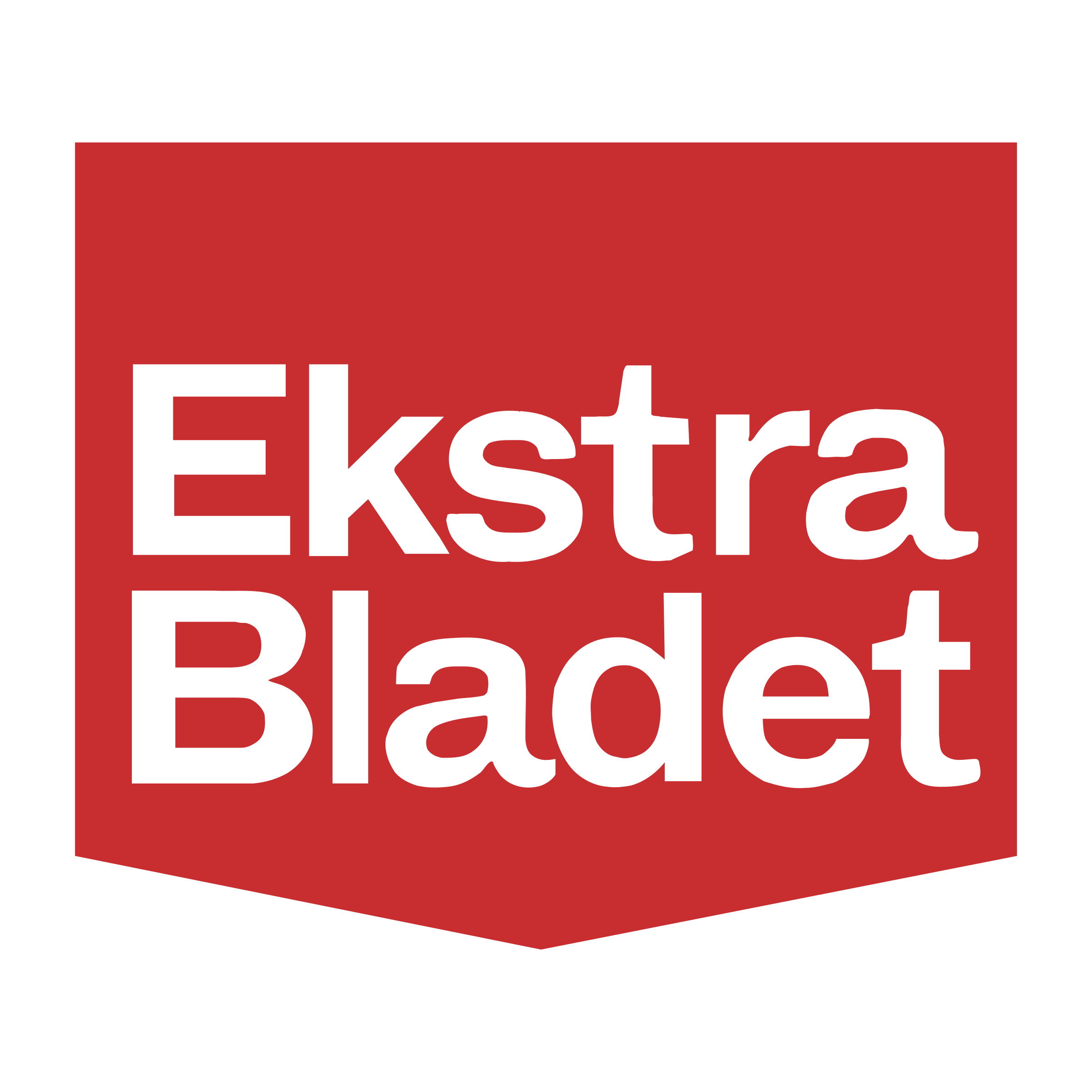

- Type: Daily newspaper
- Format: Tabloid
- Owner: JP/Politikens Hus A/S
- Publisher: JP/Politikens Hus
- Editor: Knud Brix
- Founded: 12 February 1904; 122 years ago
- Political alignment: Traditionally centre-left; no current alignment
- Language: Danish
- Headquarters: Copenhagen, Denmark
- Circulation: 60,000 (2012)
- Website: ekstrabladet.dk

Ekstra Bladet is a Danish tabloid newspaper, published by JP/Politikens Hus in Copenhagen. It was founded in 1904 as an evening edition to Politiken. In 1905 the newspaper was established in its own right and has since focused on investigative journalism, news, sports and entertainment. It has been described as a sensationalistic newspaper. Since April 2022, Knud Brix has been editor-in-chief.

== History and profile ==
The newspaper began publication 1904 as a supplement to the Politiken newspaper, and a year later, it became a separate newspaper. The headquarters of the paper is in Copenhagen.

In December 2010 Ekstra Bladet editor-in-chief Poul Madsen threatened to complain to the European Court of Justice after its submission of an application to Apple's App Store was rejected. Madsen claimed the application was deemed offensive, and in an editorial described Apple as being an "American nanny".

Since 5 October 2012 Tipsbladet, an association football magazine, has been sold with the Friday edition of Ekstra Bladet.

The current editor-in-chief is Henrik Qvortrup who took over in July 2021. Poul Madsen was chief editor from September 2007 through March 2021. Hans Engell held the position from 2000 to 2007. Victor Andreasen served as the editor-in-chief of the paper for two times, between 1963 and 1967 and between 1971 and 1976.

For over 100 years, Ekstra Bladets main competitor has been BT published by Berlingske Media.

== Circulation ==
Ekstra Bladet's readership and circulation has declined in recent years, and continues to do so. During the last six months of 1957 the paper had a circulation of 68,178 copies on weekdays. The circulation of the paper was 210,000 copies in 1991, 198,000 copies in 1992 and 185,000 copies in 1993. It fell to 177,000 copies in 1994, to 168,000 in 1995 and to 166,000 copies in 1996. Although its circulation grew to 169,000 copies in 1997, it again decreased and was 159,000 copies in 1998 and 148,000 copies in 1999.

It was 134,000 copies in 2000 and 127,000 copies in 2001. The circulation of the paper fell to 119,000 copies in 2002. It was the fourth best selling Danish newspaper in 2003 with a circulation of 110,000 copies. In 2004, the paper had a circulation of 110,000 copies. There is another report giving its 2004 circulation as 106,000 copies. In 2012, the paper had a circulation of 60,000 copies.

In January 2012, the paper's website had an Alexa Internet global rank of #2061 and a rank of #5 in Denmark. As of July 2018, the site held ranks of #3359 globally and #9 in Denmark.

== Victor Award ==
The Victor Award, or Victor of the Year (Årets Victor), is awarded in honour of former editor-in-chief Victor Andreasen. It is awarded since 1980 to an exceptional journalist, author, photographer, or cartoonist. In 2018, it was won by Danish-Kurdish author, human rights activist, and poet Sara Omar.
