= Billed Bladet =

Weekly entertainment magazine in Denmark

- Categories: Celebrity magazine; Entertainment magazine; TV magazine; Women's magazine
- Frequency: Weekly
- Publisher: Aller Press AS
- First issue: 5 April 1938; 87 years ago
- Company: Aller Media
- Country: Denmark
- Based in: Copenhagen
- Language: Danish
- Website: Billed Bladet
- ISSN: 1399-6290
- OCLC: 467992115

Billed Bladet (Danish: The Picture Magazine) is a Danish weekly entertainment and royal magazine based in Copenhagen, Denmark. Founded in 1938, it is one of the oldest magazines in the country. It was started as a conservative political magazine, but later it was redesigned in its present format.

== History and profile ==
Billed Bladet was first published on 5 April 1938. The magazine was modelled on the American magazines Life and Look. Billed Bladet is part of Aller Media. The former owner of the magazine was Den Berlingske Gruppe. Aller Media acquired the magazine in 1987. It is published by Aller Press AS weekly and has its headquarters in Copenhagen.

During its early period Billed Bladet had a much more comprehensive coverage and included more photographs. In fact, it was a political magazine targeting the conservative middle classes, particularly those living in Aarhus and Copenhagen. Immediately after World War II the magazine published the photographs of the Nazi concentration camps in Germany. From the 1960s it began to provide news on celebrities and royal families as well as on television programs, including Vild med dans (Denmark's Dancing with the Stars) and X-factor (Denmark's Got Talent). The subtitle of Billed Bladet has been Danmarks royale ugeblad (Danish: Denmarks' Weekly Magazine of Royalty) since 1995.

The weekly publishes a list of Dress of the Week. Its target audience is women over forty. Billed Bladet has high ethical standards in regard to the news it publishes. For a long time the magazine asked the permission of the members of the Danish royal family when they would be photographed in public places. Later this policy was changed, and they began to be photographed based on the decision of the editorial team of the magazine.

Annemette Krakau was appointed editor-in-chief of Billed Bladet in 2006.

== Circulation ==
Billed Bladet sold 146,450 copies in 1956, 127,257 copies in 1960 and 140,065 copies in 1964. In the 1970s the magazine enjoyed the highest circulation levels and had over a million readers per week. Its circulation rose to 241,757 copies in 1970 and to 373,650 copies in 1974.

The magazine sold 183,000 copies in 2001 and 185,000 copies in 2003. The magazine had a circulation of 204,700 copies in 2006, 201,000 copies in 2007 and 195,000 copies in 2008.

The circulation of the magazine was 176,786 copies in 2010 and 163,869 copies in 2011. The magazine sold 150,263 copies in 2012. The weekly had a circulation of 150,000 copies both in the second half of 2013 and in 2013 as a whole. In 2014 its circulation was about 133,000 copies.

== See also ==
- List of magazines in Denmark
