= Danish Data Protection Agency =

Coordinates: 55.6853°N 12.5867°E

The Danish Data Protection Agency (Danish: Datatilsynet) was created, following the implementation of EU Directive 95/46/EC, regarding the protection of individuals with regard to the process of personal information and the movement of such.

The agency exercises surveillance over the processing of data in accordance with relevant laws and acts (such as the GDPR). The agency handles specific cases on the basis of inquiries from public authorities or private individuals or cases taken up by the agency on its own initiative.

In 2021, it fined the gay application Grindr NOK 65 million ($7.2 million) for unlawfully sharing user data with third parties. In 2022, Datatilsynet launched a procedure against Meta to stop transatlantic data sharing practices through Facebook and Instagram. In 2024, it launched a regulatory sandbox for AI for GDPR compliance.

== See also ==
- General Data Protection Regulation
- ePrivacy Regulation
- Privacy law in Denmark
