= Ganger Rolf ASA =

Defunct Norwegian holding company

- Company type: Allmennaksjeselskap
- Traded as: OSE: GRO
- Industry: Holding company
- Founded: 1895
- Defunct: May 4, 2016
- Fate: Merged with Bonheur
- Headquarters: Oslo, Norway
- Key people: Anette S. Olsen (CEO)
- Revenue: ▲NOK 2.6 billion (2005)
- Operating income: NOK -34.0 million (2005)
- Net income: NOK 762.1 million (2005)
- Website: www.ganger-rolf.no

Ganger Rolf ASA was a Norwegian holding company for the Olsen family. The company was listed on the Oslo Stock Exchange and had ownership positions in numerous companies primarily within the energy and shipping sectors, but also other areas such as real estate and mass media. All investments were made 50/50 with Bonheur. Bonheur is in turn controlled by Fred. Olsen & Co., a company wholly owned by Anette S. Olsen. Ganger Rolf owned 19.51% of Bonheur.

Ganger Rolf has its headquarters in Oslo, Norway. The company is named after the Viking ruler of Normandy, Ganger Rolf.

Ganger Rolf merged with Bonheur in May 2016.

== Investments ==
- First Olsen Tankers (50%, tank ships)
- Fred. Olsen Production (50%, floating production)
- Fred. Olsen Energy (30%, offshore services)
- Fred. Olsen Renewables (50%, wind power)
- Comarit (25%, ferries)
- Fred. Olsen Cruise Lines (50%, cruise ships)
- Tusenfryd (25%, theme park)
- Norges Handels og Sjøfartstidende (16.8%, media, including Dagens Næringsliv)
- Real Estate, including IT Fornebu
