= Byford Dolphin =

Semi-submersible offshore drilling rig

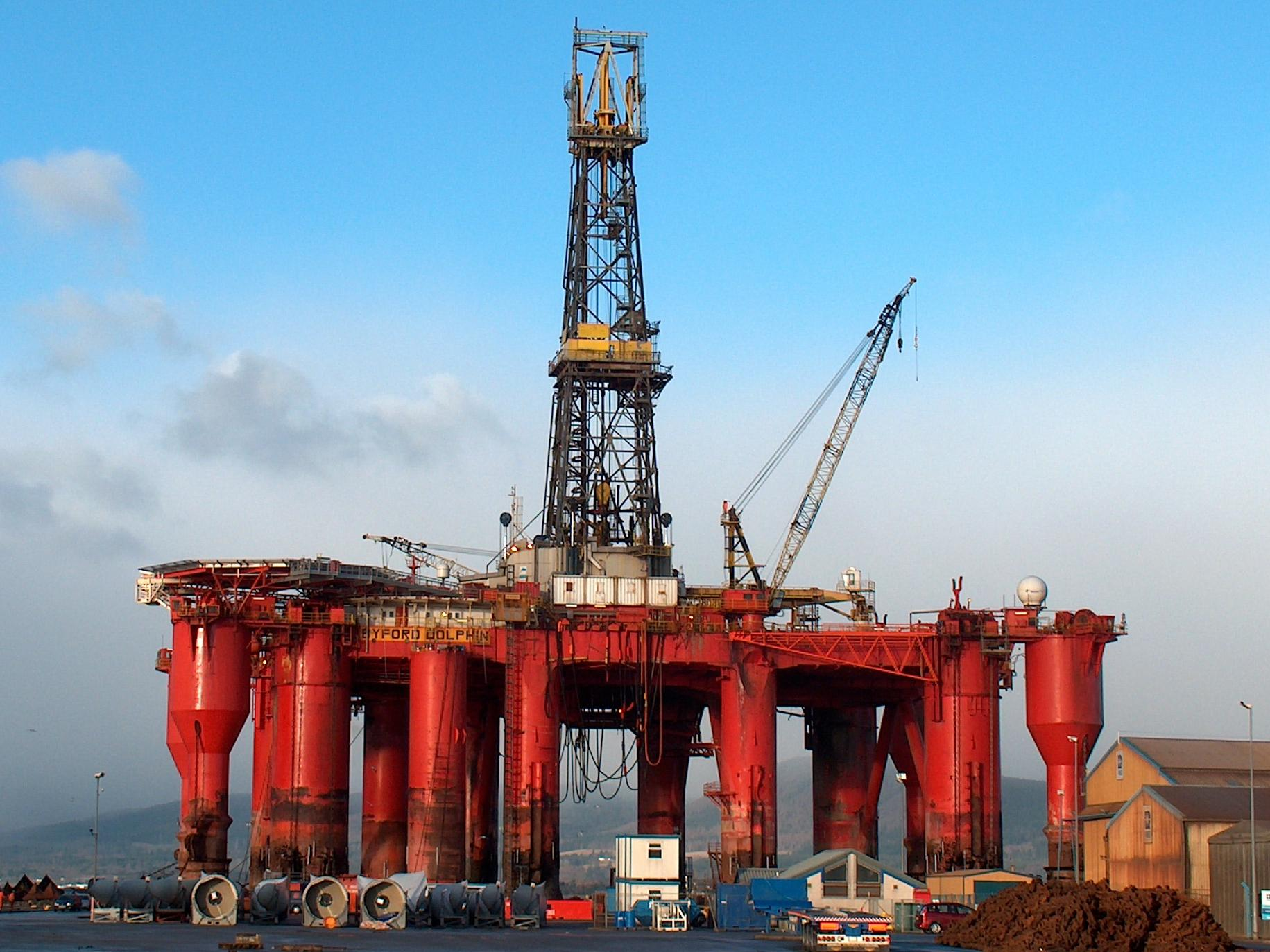
- Byford Dolphin in dry dock at Invergordon, Scotland, in 2008

History
- Name: Byford Dolphin; Deep Sea Driller (1974–1978)
- Owner: Byford Dolphin Pte. Ltd. (Fred. Olsen Energy)
- Operator: Dolphin Drilling
- Port of registry: Singapore; Panama (1974–2005); Bermuda
- Builder: Aker Group
- Yard number: Aker Verdal A/S (695)
- Laid down: 31 October 1972
- Completed: 1 February 1974
- Out of service: 2016
- Identification: Call sign: 9VDG7; DNV ID: 09092; IMO number: 8750584; MMSI no.: 563601000
- Fate: Beached Aliağa and scrapped 2019

General characteristics
- Class & type: DNV class: 1A1 Column-stabilised Drilling Unit UKVS
- Tonnage: 11,792 GT; 3,538 GT
- Length: 108.2 m (355 ft)
- Beam: 67.4 m (221 ft)
- Depth: 36.6 m (120 ft)
- Speed: 4.5 kn (8.3 km/h)
- Capacity: Variable Deck Lo: 3,021 t; Liquid Mud: 3,981 bbls (534 m^{3}); Bulk Mud/Cement: 547 t / 270 t
- Crew: 102 berths

Byford Dolphin was a semi-submersible, column-stabilised drilling rig operated by Dolphin Drilling, a subsidiary of Fred Olsen Energy. Byford Dolphin was registered in Hamilton, Bermuda, and drilled seasonally for various companies in the British, Danish, and Norwegian sectors of the North Sea. In 2019, Dolphin scrapped the rig.

The rig was the site of several serious incidents, most notably an explosive decompression in 1983 that killed four divers and one dive tender, as well as critically injuring another dive tender.

== Description ==
Built as Deep Sea Driller, Byford Dolphin was the first-of-class in the highly successful Aker H-3 series, designed by Aker Group and completed at the Aker Verdal shipyard in 1974.

Byford Dolphin had an overall length of 108.2 metres (355 ft), breadth of 67.4 metres (221 ft) and depth of 36.6 metres (120 ft). It had a maximum drilling depth of 6.1 kilometres (3.8 mi), and it could operate at a water depth of 460 metres (1,500 ft). As a drilling rig, Byford Dolphin was equipped with advanced drilling equipment and originally met strict levels of certification under Norwegian law, though in later years it was banned from Norwegian waters. Byford Dolphin was able to manoeuvre with its own engines (to counter drift and ocean currents), but for long-distance relocation it had to be moved by specialized tugboats.

Byford Dolphin specifications
Operating deck load	3,025 tonnes
Crew quarters	102 persons
Operating water depth	460 metres (1,500 ft) maximum
Derrick	49 m (160 ft) Shaffer top compensator
Mooring system	12-point
Blow-out preventer	Hydril 476 mm (18.7 in), 10,000 kPa (1,500 psi)
Sub Sea Handling System	Christmas tree
Deck cranes	2 × 40 tonnes

== Incidents and accidents ==
=== Decompression accident of 1983 ===
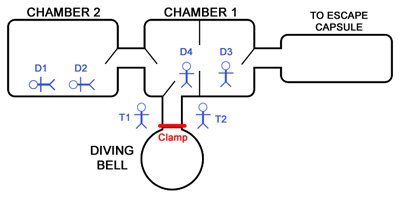
The diving chamber as seen from above at the moment the accident occurred. D1–D4 are divers; T1 and T2 are dive tenders. The trunk is the section that joins chamber 1 to the diving bell. Note T1 and T2 are outside the decompression chamber, in an area of normal pressure.

On 5 November 1983, at 4:00 a.m., while Byford Dolphin was drilling in the Frigg gas field in the Norwegian sector of the North Sea, a serious decompression accident occurred aboard the rig. Two divers – Bjørn Giæver Bergersen (Norwegian, 29) and Truls Hellevik (Norwegian, 34) – were returning to a diving chamber on the rig's deck, having been brought up from the sea floor in a diving bell. The chamber system was already occupied by divers Edwin Arthur Coward (British, 35) and Roy P. Lucas (British, 38), who were resting at the time. Two dive tenders, William Crammond (British, 32) and Martin Saunders, were on scene to assist in the transfer. The accident occurred as the tenders were disconnecting the bell, the Norwegians having passed into the chamber through a trunk or passageway. The normal procedure would have been:

1. Close the diving bell door, which would have been open to the trunk.
2. Slightly increase the pressure in the diving bell to seal the bell door tightly.
3. Close the chamber door, which was also open to the trunk.
4. Slowly depressurize the trunk until it reached a pressure of 1 atm.
5. Open the clamp to separate the diving bell from the chamber system.

The first two steps had been completed when the clamp connecting the bell to the trunk was suddenly opened. This resulted in the chamber system being rapidly depressurized from 9 atmospheres to the ambient external pressure of 1 atmosphere. Air rushed out of the chamber system with tremendous force, pushing the bell away and striking the two tenders; one of them (Crammond) was killed, while the other (Saunders) was severely injured. Hellevik, who had been about to seal the chamber door, was forced out of the narrow opening between the door and the frame, tearing his body apart. The other three divers were killed on the spot.

==== Medical findings ====
Medical investigations were carried out on the remains of the four divers. The most notable finding was the presence of large amounts of fat in large arteries and veins and in the cardiac chambers, as well as intravascular fat in organs, especially the liver. This fat was unlikely to be embolic, but must have precipitated from the blood in situ. The postmortem suggested that bubble formation in the blood denatured the lipoprotein complexes, rendering the lipids insoluble. These now-insoluble lipids are likely what stopped their circulation.

The fourth diver died from gross dismemberment when the blast forced his body out through the partially blocked doorway. Parts of him were found scattered around the rig, up to 10 metres (30 ft) from the chamber.

==== Investigation ====
The committee investigating the accident concluded that it was caused by human error on the part of the dive tender who opened the clamp. The trunk door had a centre hinge design, similar to a butterfly valve disc, and the door was rotated too far to the left, causing the rim of the interior hatch to lodge on the door opening. This left a crescent-shaped opening, similar to a manhole cover left ajar but held in place. This created an opening that was 60 centimetres (24 in) across horizontally. It is not clear whether the tender who opened the clamp before the trunk was depressurized did so by order of his supervisor, on his own initiative, or because of miscommunication. At the time, the only communication the tenders on the outside of the chamber system had was through a megaphone attached to the wall surface; with heavy noise from the rig and sea, it was hard to listen in on what was going on. Fatigue may also have taken its toll on the crew, who had been working for longer than 12 hours.

This incident was also attributed to engineering failure. The obsolete Byford Dolphin diving system, dating from 1975, was not equipped with fail-safe hatches, outboard pressure gauges, and an interlocking mechanism, which would have prevented the trunk from being opened while the system was under pressure. Prior to the accident, Norske Veritas had issued the following rule for certification: "Connecting mechanisms between bell and chambers are to be so arranged that they cannot be operated when the trunk is pressurized", therefore requiring such systems to have fail-safe seals and interlocking mechanisms. One month after the accident, Norske Veritas and the Norwegian oil directorate made the rule final for all bell systems.

Among others, former crew members of Byford Dolphin and NOPEF (a Norwegian oil and petro-chemical union) have come forward and claimed the investigation was a cover-up. They claimed that the commission investigating the accident did not mention in their report the irresponsible dispensations on vital equipment requested by Comex and authorized by the diving section to the Norwegian Petroleum Directorate, which played a vital role in the accident's occurrence. They also alleged the accident was due to a lack of proper equipment, including clamping mechanisms equipped with interlocking mechanisms (which would be impossible to open while the chamber system was still under pressure), outboard pressure gauges, and a safe communication system, all of which had been held back because of dispensations by the Norwegian Petroleum Directorate.

==== Lawsuit ====
The North Sea Divers Alliance, formed by early North Sea divers and the relatives of those killed, continued to press for further investigation and, in February 2008, obtained a report that indicated the real cause was faulty equipment. Clare Lucas, daughter of Roy Lucas, said: "I would go so far as to say that the Norwegian Government murdered my father because they knew that they were diving with an unsafe decompression chamber." The families of the divers eventually received compensation for the damages from the Norwegian government, 26 years after the incident.

=== Other incidents ===
On 17 April 2002, a 44-year-old Norwegian worker on the rig was struck on the head and killed in an industrial accident. The accident resulted in Byford Dolphin losing an exploration contract with Statoil, which expressed concerns with the rig's operating procedures. The incident cost the company millions of US dollars in lost income.

These incidents raised concerns about Byford Dolphin and ultimately led to it going out of service in 2016.

== See also ==
- Commercial offshore diving – Professional diving in support of the oil and gas industry
- Saturation diving – Diving mode and decompression technique
- Piper Alpha – Oil platform destroyed by explosion and fire in 1988
- Pioneer – 2013 Norwegian thriller film, a fictional story set in the 1970s Norwegian oil industry which features a fatal decompression chamber accident and its cover-up
- 2022 Paria diving disaster
