= Rudolf Olsen =

Norwegian shipping magnate

Rudolf Fredrik Olsen (29 September 1882 – 26 January 1951) was a Norwegian shipping magnate and Chairman of Fred. Olsen & Co.

== Biography ==
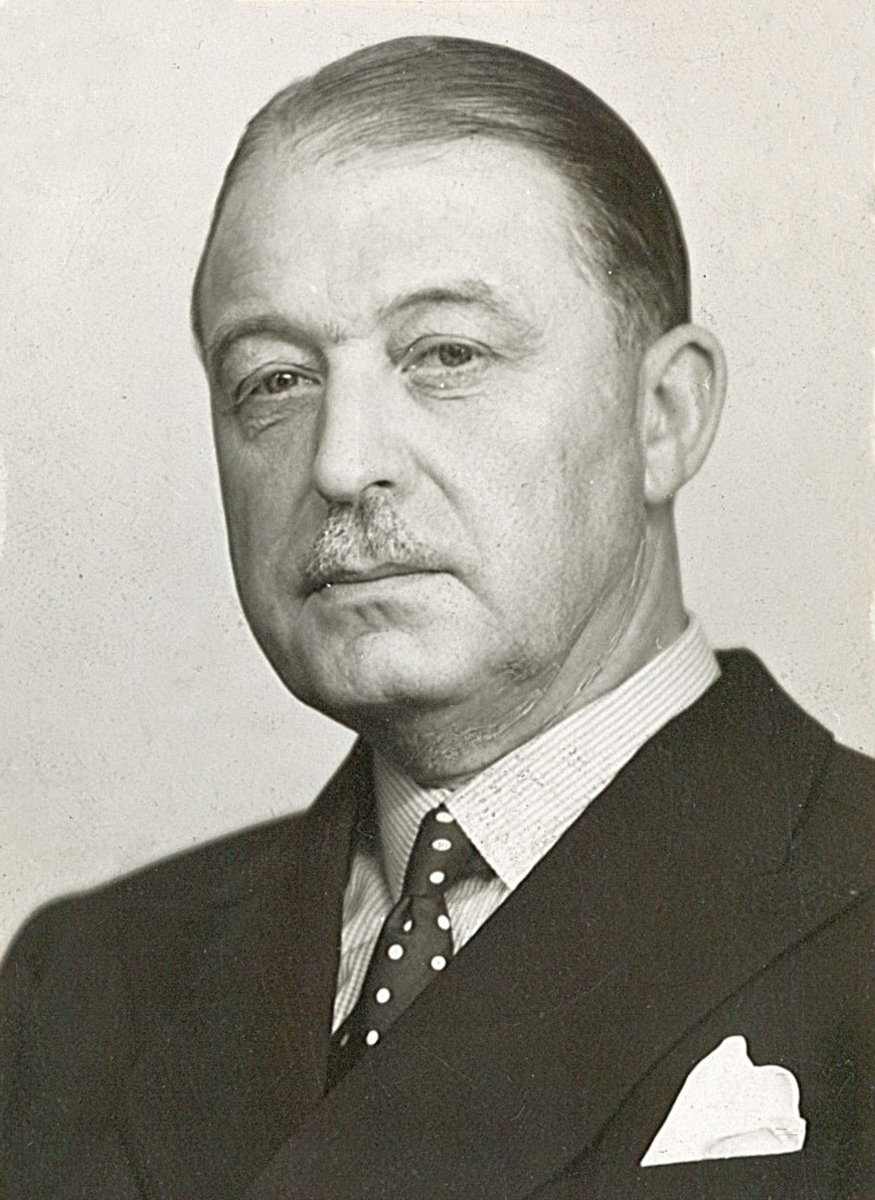
Rudolf Olsen

Rudolf Fredrik Olsen was born in Hvitsten, in Akershus county, Norway. He was the son of Thomas Frederick (Fred.) Olsen (1857-1933). Olsen was educated in Britain, France and Belgium.

Olsen worked in the family firm, Fred. Olsen & Co. dating from 1914. Together with his brother Thomas Fredrik Olsen, he was a partner from 1922. After their father's death in 1933, the brothers took over as leaders of the company. From 1933 he was CEO of the firm. During his leadership, the company expanded, entering the aviation business with its own airline Fred. Olsen Flyselskap. In addition it obtained partial ownership interests in Scandinavian Airlines System, Widerøe's Flyveselskap AS and Sterling Airlines A/S.

Olsen held a board position in a range of companies, including Det Norske Luftfartselskap. From 1917, Olsen was Consul General to Norway from Italy. In 1938, Olsen was appointed a Knight of the 1st Class of the Order of St. Olav. He was also appointed commander of the Order of the Crown of Italy and the Order of the Crown (Belgium), was an officer of the Order of Saints Maurice and Lazarus and knight of the Order of the White Rose of Finland.

== Other sources ==
- Nygaard, K. M. (1999) Fra seilskip av tre til dampskip i linjefart. Fred. Olsens rederivirksomhet 1886–1904 (University of Oslo)
