= GB Theatre Company =

The GB Theatre Company is a British touring company that specialises in outdoor productions of Shakespeare. Founded in 2010 by Gillian Roca and Barrie Palmer. The first productions in 2010 were As You Like It directed by Neil Sheppeck and Merry Wives of Windsor directed by Jenny Stephens. The productions were played in rep and starred Gabriel Thomson, Matt Milburn, Stacey Roca and Alexander Delamere. The tour took in Dublin's Trinity College, Ramme Gaard in Norway, Prague Castle, Norwich Cathedral, Kentwell Hall and Arundel Castle.

The following year the Company produced Romeo and Juliet and Twelfth Night which was directed by Michael Woodwood. Several new performers joined Gabriel Thomson as Romeo and David Davies who played Friar Lawrence and took over as Mercutio when the Company played The Victorian Embankment Gardens in London. Once again, Norwich Cathedral and Arundel Castle were on the tour schedule and appear on the website as destinations for 2012. Indeed, the Company is the headline act at The Dublin Shakespeare Festival, The Norwich Shakespeare Festival and The Arundel Festival. Arundel is the seat of The Duke of Norfolk who is often in attendance at the Company's performances there.

The Company features actors in traditional costume and live music.

In 2012 the company toured internationally with The Tempest directed by Jack Shepherd, (famous as television's Wycliffe) and The Taming of the Shrew directed by Jenny Stephens. Venues included Exeter Castle, Norway's Ramme Gaard, Norwich Cathedral, Kensington Palace Gardens, Warwick Castle, Arundel Castle. The media attention focused on the success of The Tempest with its solid performances. The 2013 programme was announced as A Midsummer Night's Dream and The Merchant of Venice.
