= Buraas =

Buraas is a surname. Notable people with the surname include:

- Anders Buraas (1915–2010), Norwegian journalist and author
- Hans Petter Buraas (born 1975), Norwegian skier
- Sindre Buraas (born 1989), Norwegian runner
