= Dolphin Drilling =

Offshore drilling company

Dolphin Drilling Holdings Limited
- Type: Listed company
- Industry: Offshore services
- Founded: 1965; 61 years ago
- Headquarters: Aberdeen, Scotland, United Kingdom
- Key people: Ronny Bjornadal (chairman); Jon Oliver Bryce (CEO)
- Services: Offshore drilling Marine engineering
- Revenue: 4,277,000 Norwegian krone (2007)
- Operating income: 1,955,000 Norwegian krone (2007)
- Net income: 1,392,000 Norwegian krone (2007)
- Website: dolphindrilling.no

Dolphin Drilling Holdings Limited is an offshore drilling rig company headquartered in Aberdeen, Scotland, United Kingdom with its main subsidiary Dolphin Drilling AS located in Sandnes, Norway. Until 2019, Dolphin Drilling had its headquarters in Oslo, Norway.

The company is most known for having operated the Byford Dolphin drilling rig, which was the site of an explosive decompression incident in 1983, killing five people.

== History ==
In 1965, A/S Aker Drilling Company Ltd. (Dolphin Drilling) was established. In 1976, Fred. Olsen & Co. acquired Aker Drilling Services, and renamed it Dolphin Services A/S.

In 1997, based on Dolphin Services A/S, the Fred. Olsen Energy ASA was formed. The company was listed on Oslo Stock Exchange with the tickers FOE and later DDASA. In 1998, its remotely operated vehicle division was sold to Stolt Comex Seaways (now Subsea 7). In 2003, Dolphin Well Services AS was sold to PSL Energy Services Limited.

Fred. Olsen Energy ASA was renamed to Dolphin Drilling ASA in December 2018. In June 2019, Dolphin Drilling filed for bankruptcy. The main shareholders that time were the companies Bonheur and Ganger Rolf ASA, controlled by the Olsen family. A debt investor SVP Global acquired more than 90% of the company's debts and transferred its operating subsidiaries to a new Jersey-registered holding company, Dolphin Drilling Holdings Limited. Shortly afterwards, the international headquarters of the company were moved to Aberdeen.

In May 2022, it was announced that Cyprus-headquartered oilfield services company, SD Standard ETC had acquired a 25% stake in Dolphin Drilling, as part of a $10 million USD deal.

As of March 2025, Dolphin Drilling AS underwent changes in its ownership structure:

- March 3, 2025: S.D. Standard ETC Plc (SDSD) announced its intention to sell its entire 17.1% stake in Dolphin Drilling AS through a private placement.
- March 4, 2025: SDSD completed the sale of 49,784,706 shares at NOK 1.1 per share, totaling approximately NOK 55 million, thereby fully divesting its holdings in the company. SVP remains the owner of c. 24% of the company.
- March 13, 2025: Svelland Capital and B.O. Steen Shipping increased their respective shareholdings in Dolphin Drilling to 34% and 10%.

== Fleet ==
Fleet owned and operated:

- 1 deepwater drilling rig Blackford Dolphin - 7 000 ft water depth
- 2 Mid water semi submersible drilling rigs, Borgland Dolphin and Paul B. Loyd Jr.
