= Nimslo =

Stereo camera

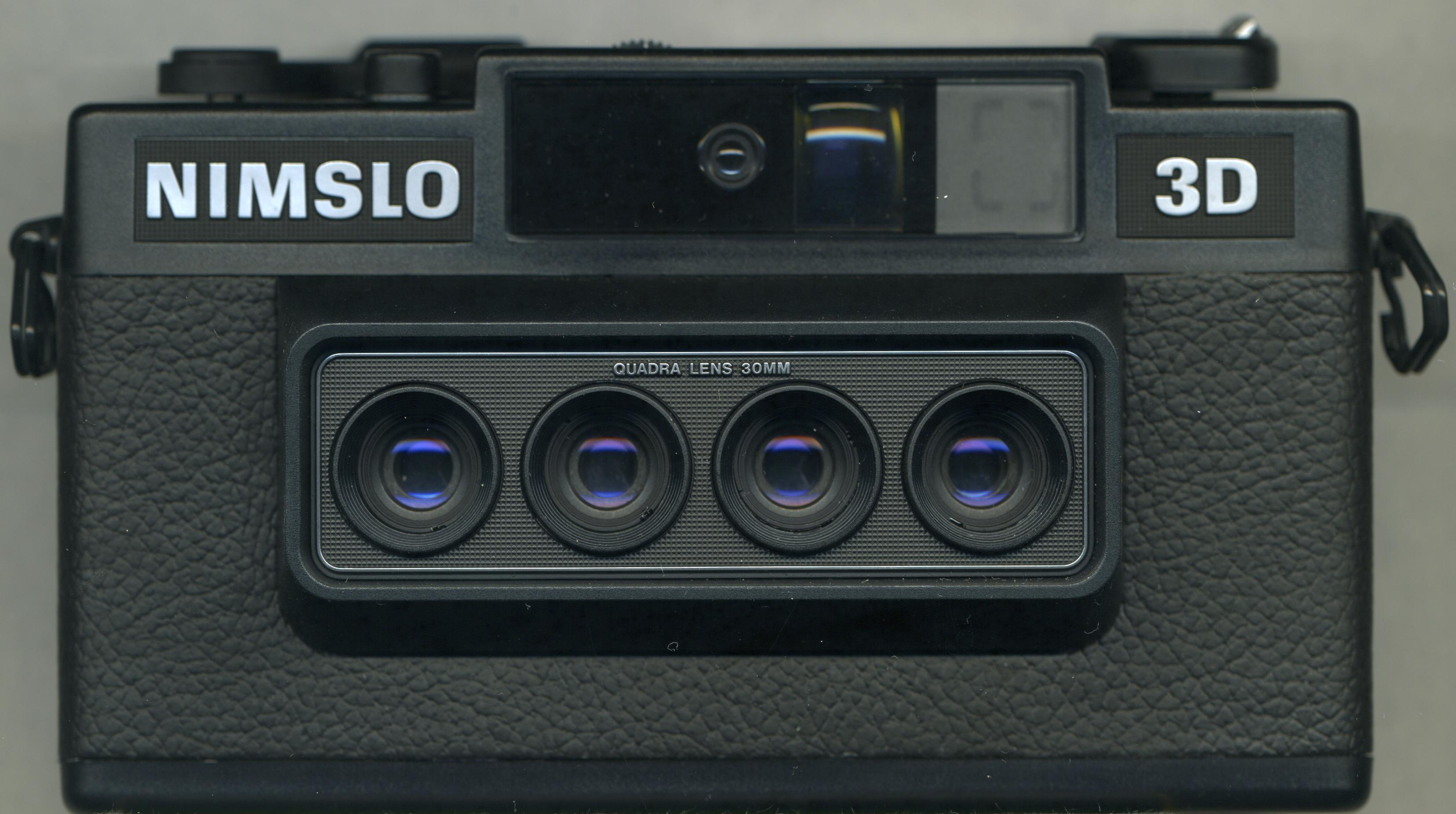
Nimslo Camera

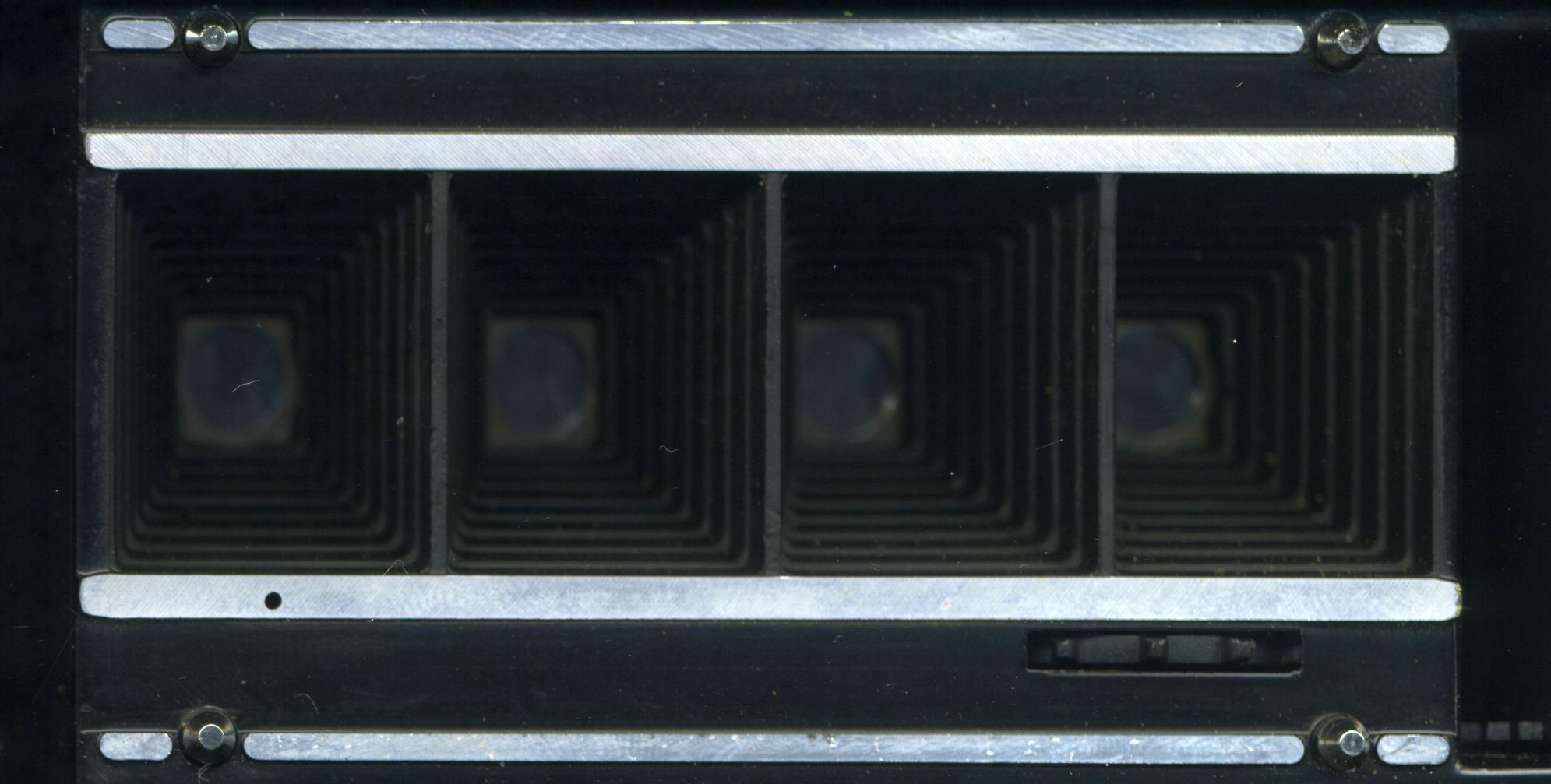
Nimslo film chamber

The Nimslo is a stereo camera with a brightfield viewfinder that produces 3D pictures that can be viewed without glasses. This is done using lenticular printing. It uses common 35 mm film in 135 film format cartridges. It was produced in the 1980s by Nimstec of Atlanta, and manufactured by Timex in Dundee, Scotland.

== Features ==
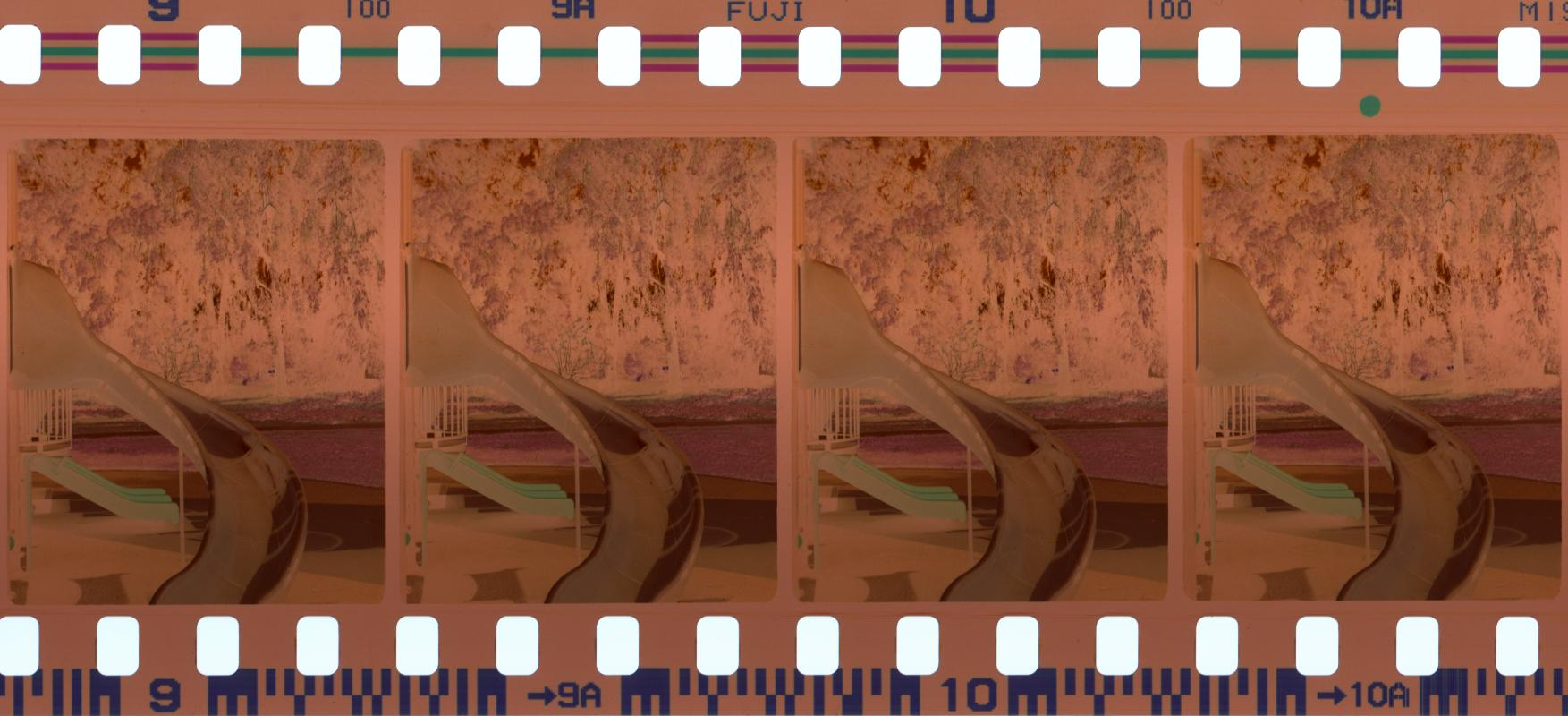
Nimslo film strip, scanned as a positive to show it as is, note how the red LED.reverses to a green dot on the negative strip

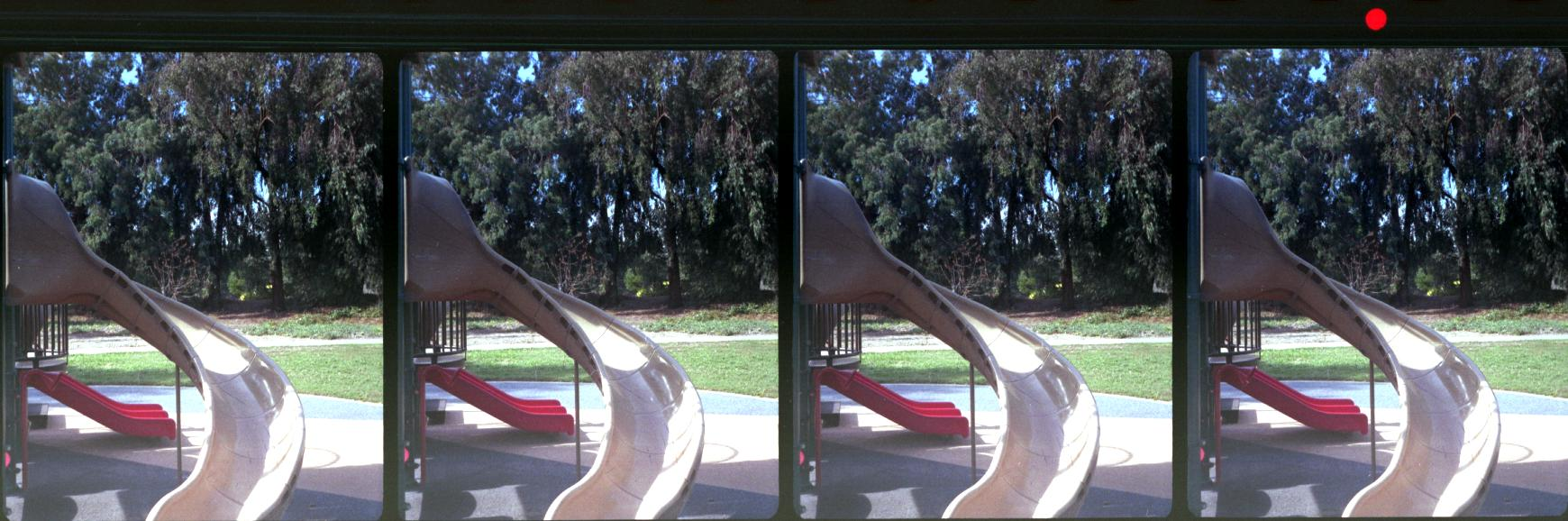
Nimslo film strip, scanned as a negative

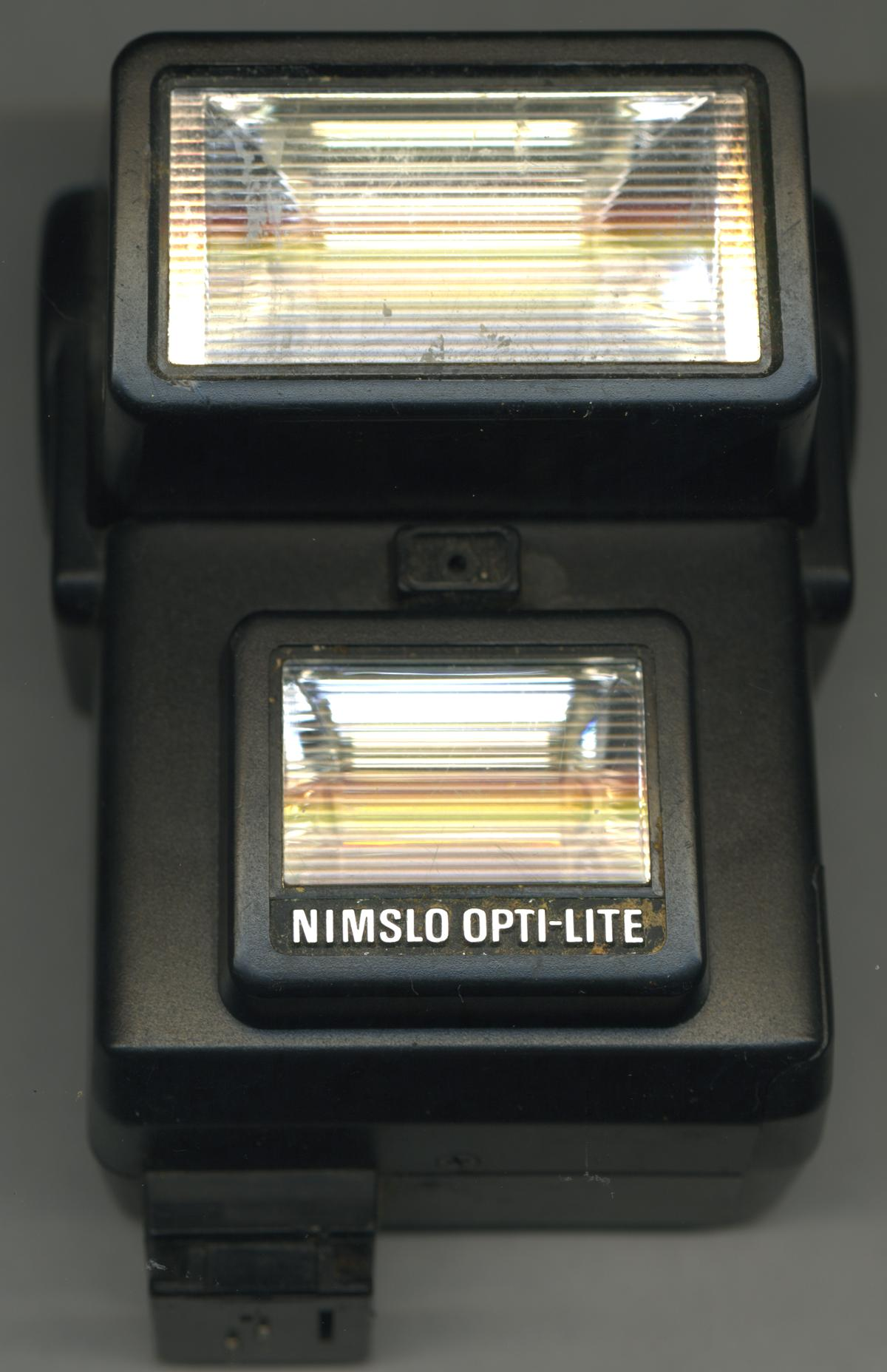
Nimslo Optilite flash

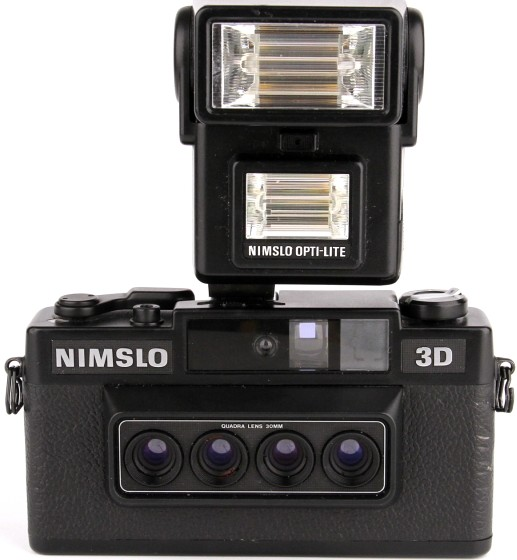
Nimslo with Optilite flash

The Nimslo had fixed focus and automatic exposure. It featured a leathered metal body and glass lenses. Using its four lenses, four images from slightly different viewing angles were taken simultaneously. With the individual images half the size of the usual 35mm image frames, each 3D photograph taken used the space of 2 full 35mm exposures on the film. So a roll labeled as "36 exposures" would yield 18 3D pictures with four images each.

The Nimslo was the first consumer level three-dimensional lenticular camera of the 1980s. There were previous lenticular cameras aimed at amateurs, such as the six-lens Lentic, introduced in 1953, which used 120 roll film, but the Nimslo was probably the first to use 35mm film, and certainly the first that could fit in a pocket.

The camera used a red LED to put a green dot on the negative. This was how the printer knew where a group of four negatives started. This dot appeared in the otherwise blank area above the image so it didn't appear in the printed frame. This feature appears to be unique to the NimsLo. Other lenticular cameras don't have it and other lenticular printers don't use it.

The Nimslo was originally built in a Timex factory in Dundee, Scotland. A massive strike in Dundee, as the U.S. rollout was gaining strong momentum, caused Nimslo to miss the delivery dates on all cameras sold. This led to the cancellation of the Timex contract. Later cameras were built by Sunpak in Japan.

Nimslo and its lenticular printer were invented by Jerry Curtis Nims from Georgia, USA, and Allen Kwok Wah Lo. Jerry Nims received one of the ten outstanding engineering achievements in the United States for the Nimslo Three-Dimensional Photographic System at the 17th Annual Competition of the National Society of Professional Engineers in 1983.

Lenticular prints would be ordered from special print shops using dedicated printers. The pictures produced by the Nimslo camera create a three-dimensional image that can be seen with the naked eye. This 3D image is made possible by the lenticular printing process that was customized by the Nimslo inventors, though professional lenticular prints had been around for a while.

== US patents ==
The technology was protected by US patents.

- U.S. patent 4,086,585 – System and camera for controlling depth of field in three-dimensional photography
- U.S. patent 4,120,562 – Stereoscopic picture
- U.S. patent 4,124,291 – Control of depth of field in three dimensional photography
- U.S. patent 3,960,563 – Methods and apparatus for taking and composing stereoscopic pictures
- U.S. patent 4,037,950 – Camera for taking stereoscopic pictures
- U.S. patent 4,063,265 – Apparatus for taking stereoscopic pictures

== Nimstec, Timex and Fred Olsen ==
The shares of the Nimstec were bought by Eagleville Company in October 1980, controlled by the Ptarmigan Trust that at the same time gained control over Timex Corporation. The operation was controlled by billionaire Fredrik Olsen, head of the Fred. Olsen & Co. shipping company. Olsen was a technological and industrial visionary and believed strongly in the Nimslo product. He wanted the Timex factory in Dundee in Scotland to produce the cameras, as they had already produced cameras for Polaroid. He established a guarantee of US$25 million for the acquisition of the Nimslo shares. Nimslo was taken publicly on the Unlisted Securities Market (USM) London by Baring Brothers and Carr, Sebag. Later, as an American depository receipt (ADR), Nimslo was the number one selling stock on the NASDAQ until the strike in Dundee stopped deliveries. Later still, Nimslo was public on the Bermuda Exchange, including substantial oil interests which had been added by Fred Olsen. Soon thereafter, Nimslo was privatized.

== Mark 1S and Mark 1A Printers ==
The original Nimslo photographic printer (the Mark 1S) was controlled by a KIM-1 processor. The operator had to view the actual images to align the images. The time to create a picture was measured in minutes. The second photographic printer was the Mark 1A. This printer was controlled by a Data General MicroNova processor, using the MP/OS operating system. This machine used a video system and was able to create a picture in about 15 seconds.

Nimslo prints are created by printing the four images through the lenticular print material, each at a different angle, to a photosensitive emulsion on the back of the lenticular material. The print material is then processed in a normal photofinishing machine, as the back of the print material is permeable to the photofinishing chemicals.

== Market response ==
Although the idea of a consumer level camera that could make lenticular 3D prints similar to those that had appeared for many years on book covers and other novelty items certainly had appeal, it did not receive a large market share of camera purchases, partially due to the high costs of processing and longer wait times than traditional cameras. In the summer of 1982, Nimslo was the fastest selling 35mm camera in the U.S., including being on the cover of the Sears catalog.

During the height of its meteoric rise, Nimslo had sought to acquire Berkey Industries (NYSE-BKY), of which it had obtained sixteen percent. Instead, after the strike, its plans to acquire Berkey were abandoned. Berkey issued its LOI to acquire the photo finishing labs of Nimslo International Ltd., for common stock, which would have raised the Nimslo holdings of Berkey from 16 to 45 percent. However, this transaction was never consummated.

After the Dundee strike, the sales team, led by former top Polaroid executive, Corvin Cianci, could not regain the top position with the replacement camera manufactured in Japan by Sunpak Company.

== Clones ==
=== Nishika ===
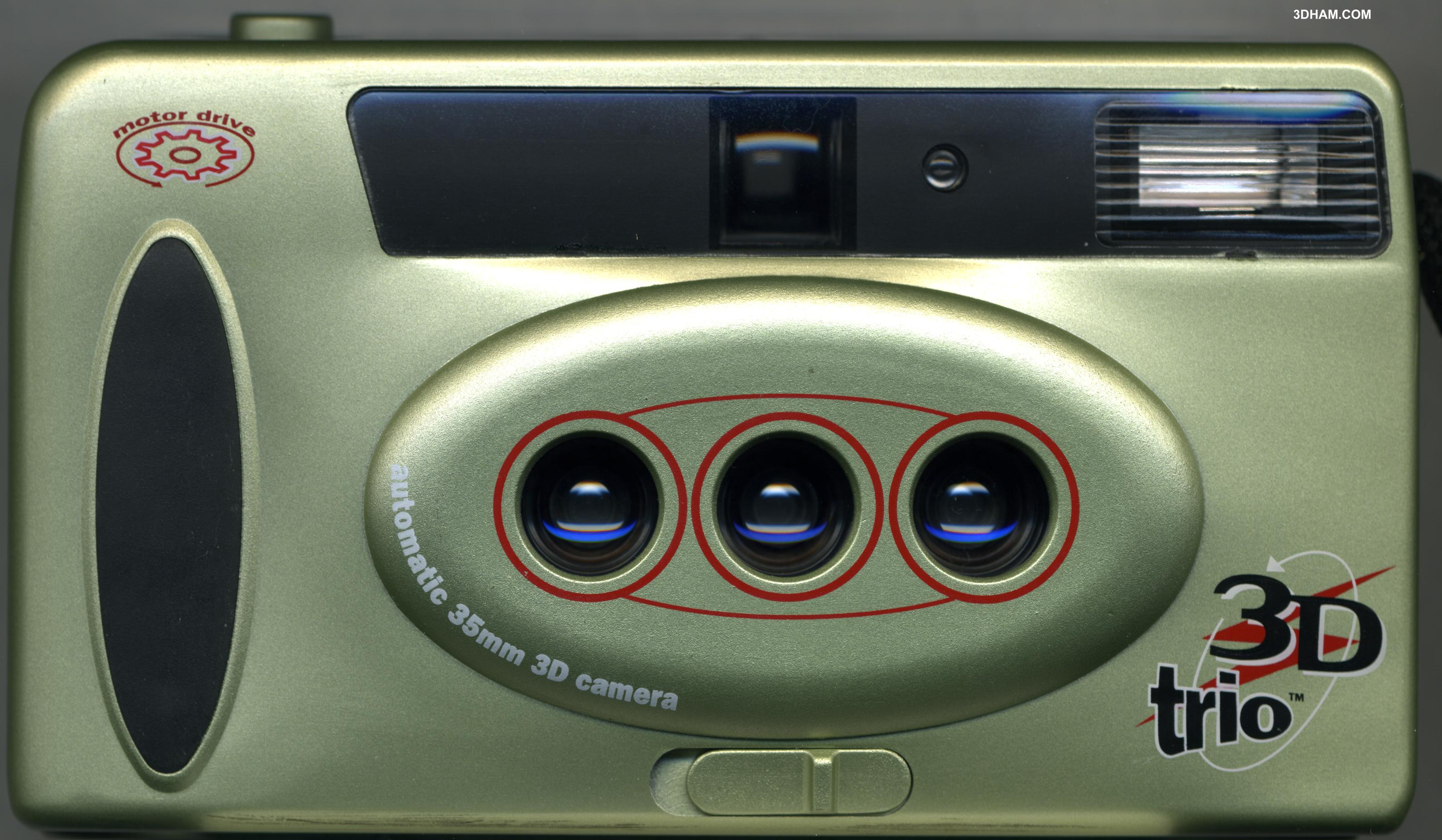
The 3D trio deluxe 3 lens Nimslo clone

Nimslo Corp was partly sold to Nishika, a Nevada company that acquired the Nimslo patents, and continued the Nimslo as "Nishika 3-D N8000". In April 1989, Nishika introduced the four lens Nishika N8000 and later the four lens N9000. The N8000 featured a plastic body with plastic lenses, a fixed 1/60 shutter speed and a three-position manual aperture lever that selected f8, f11 or f19. The N9000 was a more compact, sleeker version but was essentially the same camera, except with 2 aperture settings, f8 and f16, instead of 3. Part of the marketing effort included a promotional/instructional video starring Vincent Price. Nishika also offered a companion flash, similar to the Nimslo Optilite but much bulkier and with just one contact plus ground. They also offered a number of other accessories including a "professional" strap, Nishika Tripod, a Nishika deluxe camera case, a lens cleaning kit and even a line of Nishika brand color print film, marked with both regular and 3D exposures, though the advertising stressed that it could use any ASA 100 color print film.

Nishika also offered a lenticular processing service.

Design of the Nishika N8000

The flash contact sits atop a small platform which resembles the Pentaprism found on an SLR. The camera is much larger than it needs to be, a lead weight was included to make it heavier, there is a plastic panel on top designed to look like an LCD readout and the two AA batteries serve no function except to power the "light meter" which merely indicates whether or not flash should be used. The "use flash" indicator is not coupled to the aperture lever and is thus valid only when f8 (cloudy/indoors) is selected and when ASA 100 film is used. Also, the hot shoe has three contacts (in addition to ground), but two simply sit on top of the plastic with no internal connection. The companion flash has only a single contact in addition to ground.

Nishika was the number one selling direct sales product until bad color emulsions from 3M caused the 3D snapshots to fade. As a result, Nishika sued 3M.

Attempting to recover, Nishika used misleading and even illegal tactics to market the camera, including an infamous fraudulent prize promotion scheme, which is usually blamed for the company's demise.

=== Other Clones ===
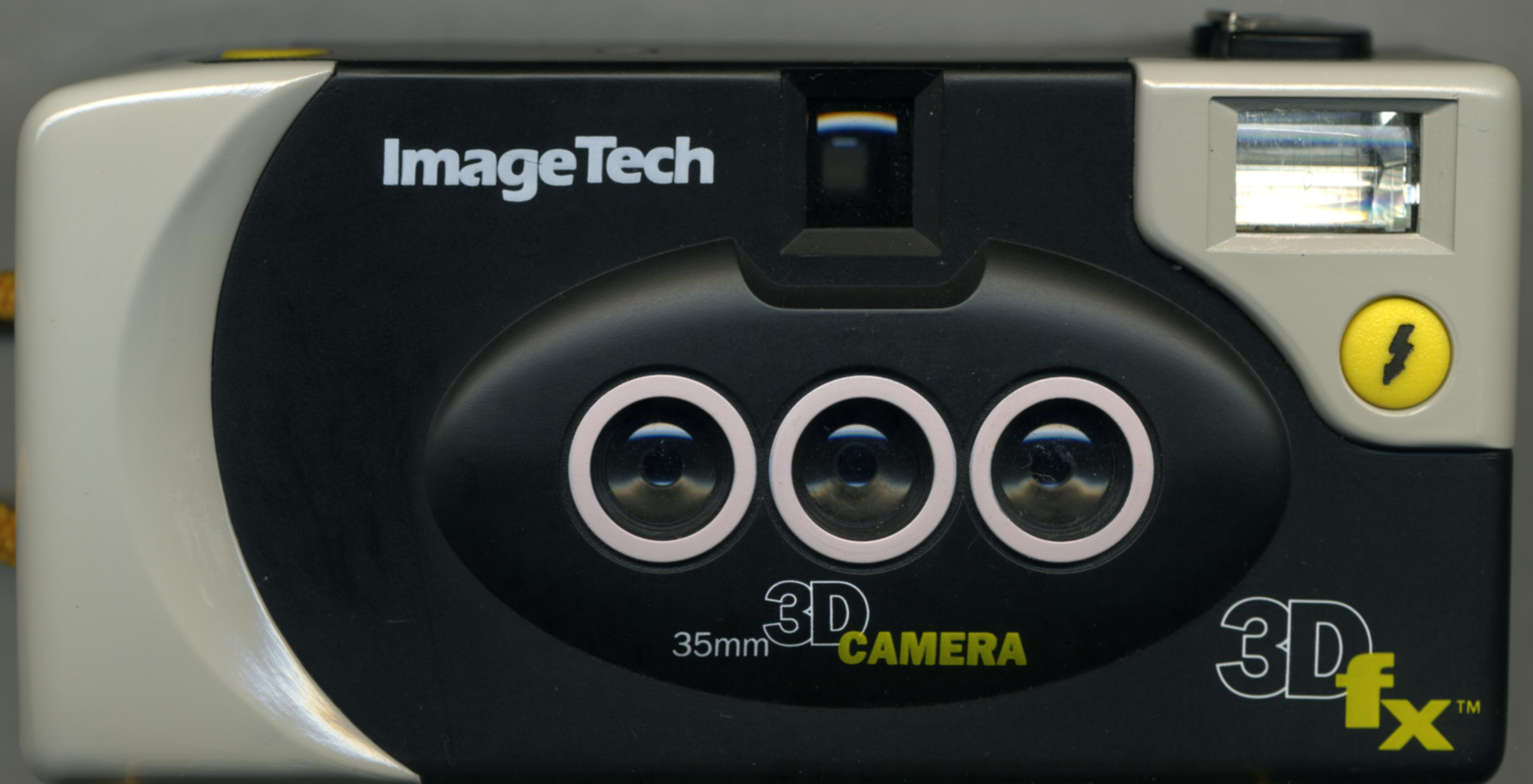
3Dfx from Image Tech

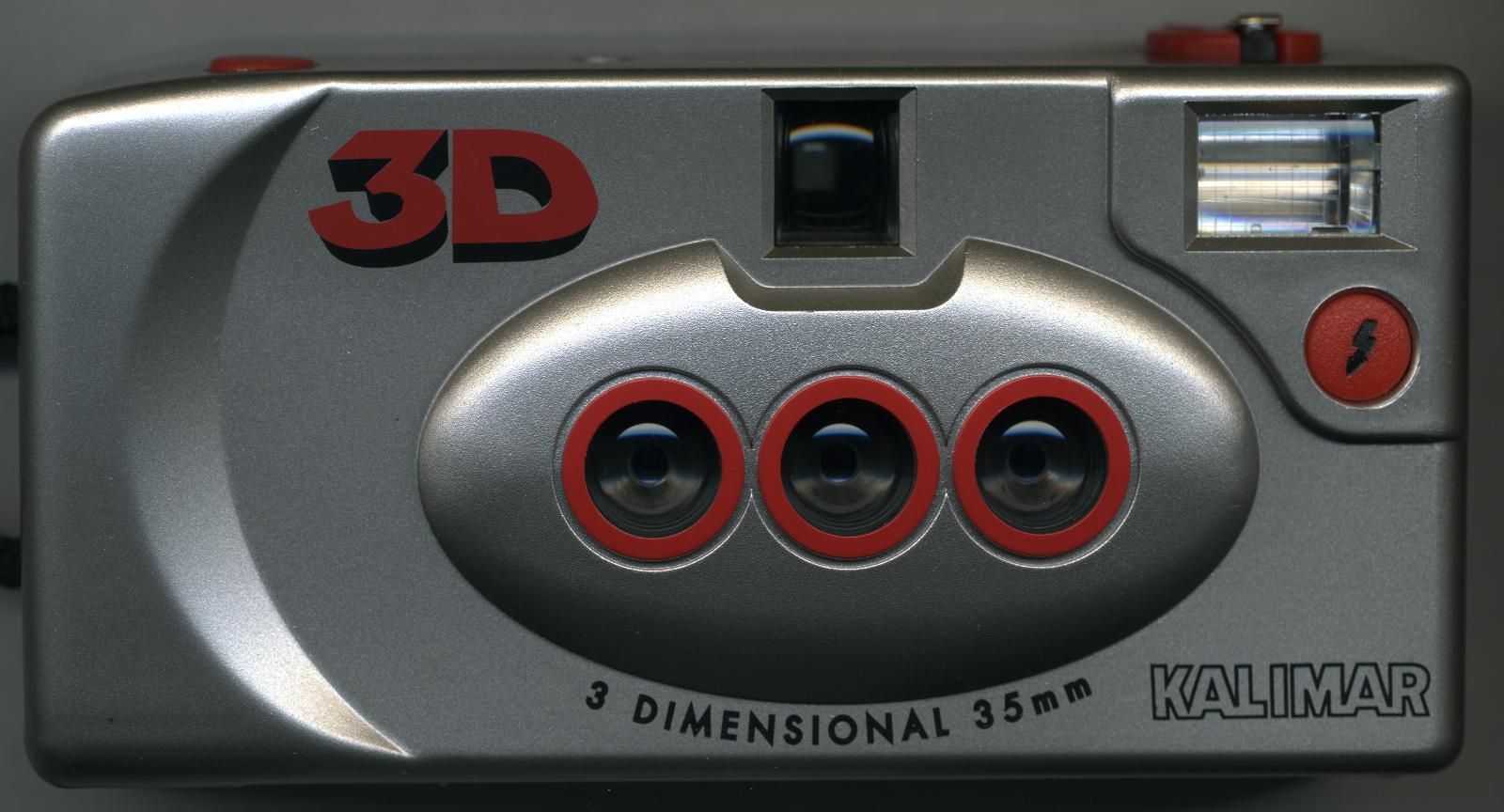
Kalimar, with obvious styling similarities

Starks claimed that Nishika also made a three-lens camera, but there is no evidence that such a camera ever existed outside his article. It is interesting that some of the Nishika "dealers" claimed that the Nimslo had only 3 lenses.

The confusion on the part of Michael Starks may stem from the introduction about a year later of the 3 lens Trilogy, which sported a built in electronic flash and motorized film advance, and was originally marketed through a system very similar to the multilevel scheme used by Nishika. The same camera was later renamed to Image Tech 3D 1000 and marketed through more traditional channels.

Several other three-lens cameras were released, such as the 3D wizard, 3D magic, 'DFX, and Kalimar, some of which sported more modern features such as built-in electronic flash and motorized film advance, but lacked the auto-exposure features of the Nimslo. The 3D trio featured 3 element coated glass lenses, built in flash, motorized film advance, automatic exposure control, compatibility with DX coded ASA 100, 200 and 400 film, and a built in protective lens cover, making it the closest three-lens equivalent to the Nimslo. These 3 lens cameras gave more pictures per roll of film, 16 for 24 exposure roll rather than the 12 yielded by Nimslo/Nishika and had less ghosting, but also less depth. There were other four-lens Nimslo clones as well, such as the 3DNext and the Rittai. Like the Nishika, several of these were marketed through multilevel schemes, often in Asian countries, occasionally being the basis of a scam.

In 2005 the Canadian firm Snap 3D began selling several two-lens and five-lens lenticular cameras made by US technology Ltd in Hong Kong. The five-lens cameras were particularly odd producing five images that were 29.94 mm high and from 24.75 to 26.33 mm wide, all five images having a different width. These were deluxe cameras, featuring glass lenses, adjustable focus with rangefinder, adjustable shutter speeds 1/125, 1/60, 1/30 sec. and "B", continuously adjustable aperture from f/5.6 to f22 and a spirit level. They also had automatic film loading and motorized film advance. Indeed, these cameras were so far removed from the Nimslo, that it might be stretching things to call them Nimslo clones. Snap 3D no longer sells these cameras and as of May 2012, no longer does lenticular printing due to failure of their machine.

== After market ==
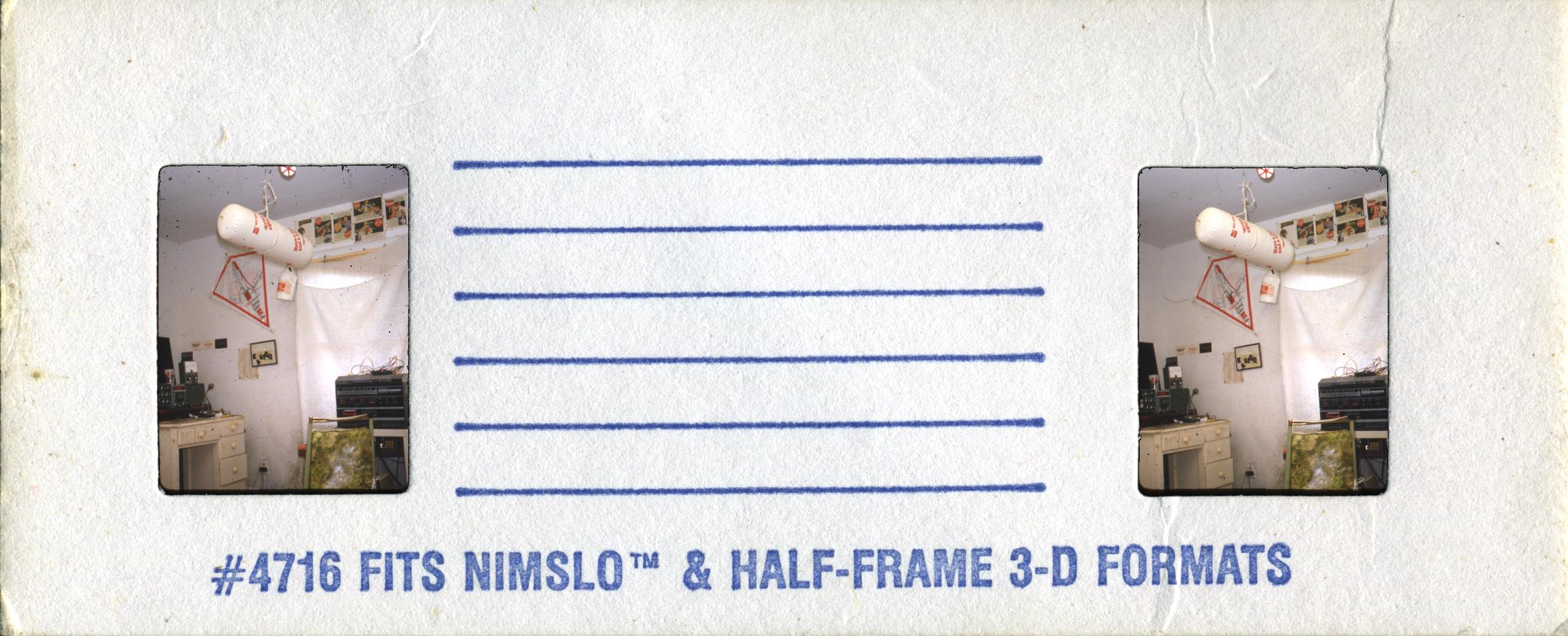
Cardboard mount used for slides taken with the Nimslo

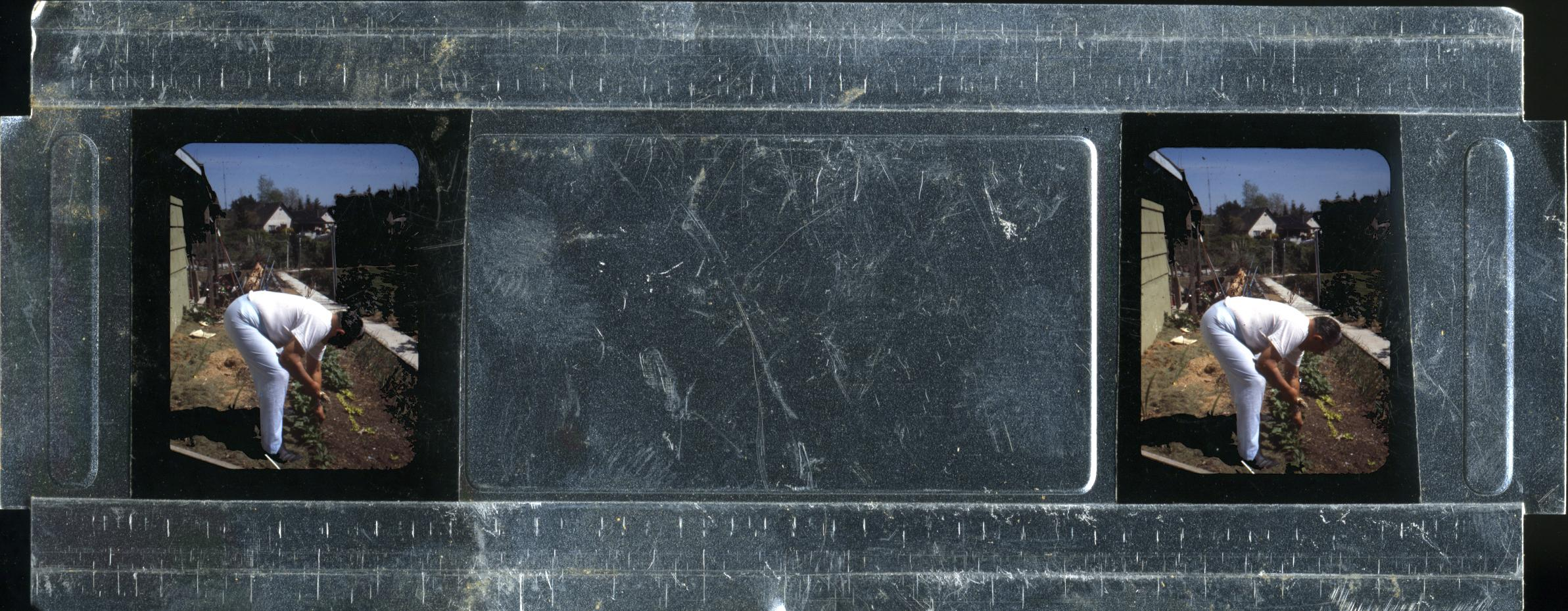
aluminum 4P, half frame mask, also known as realist closeup mask

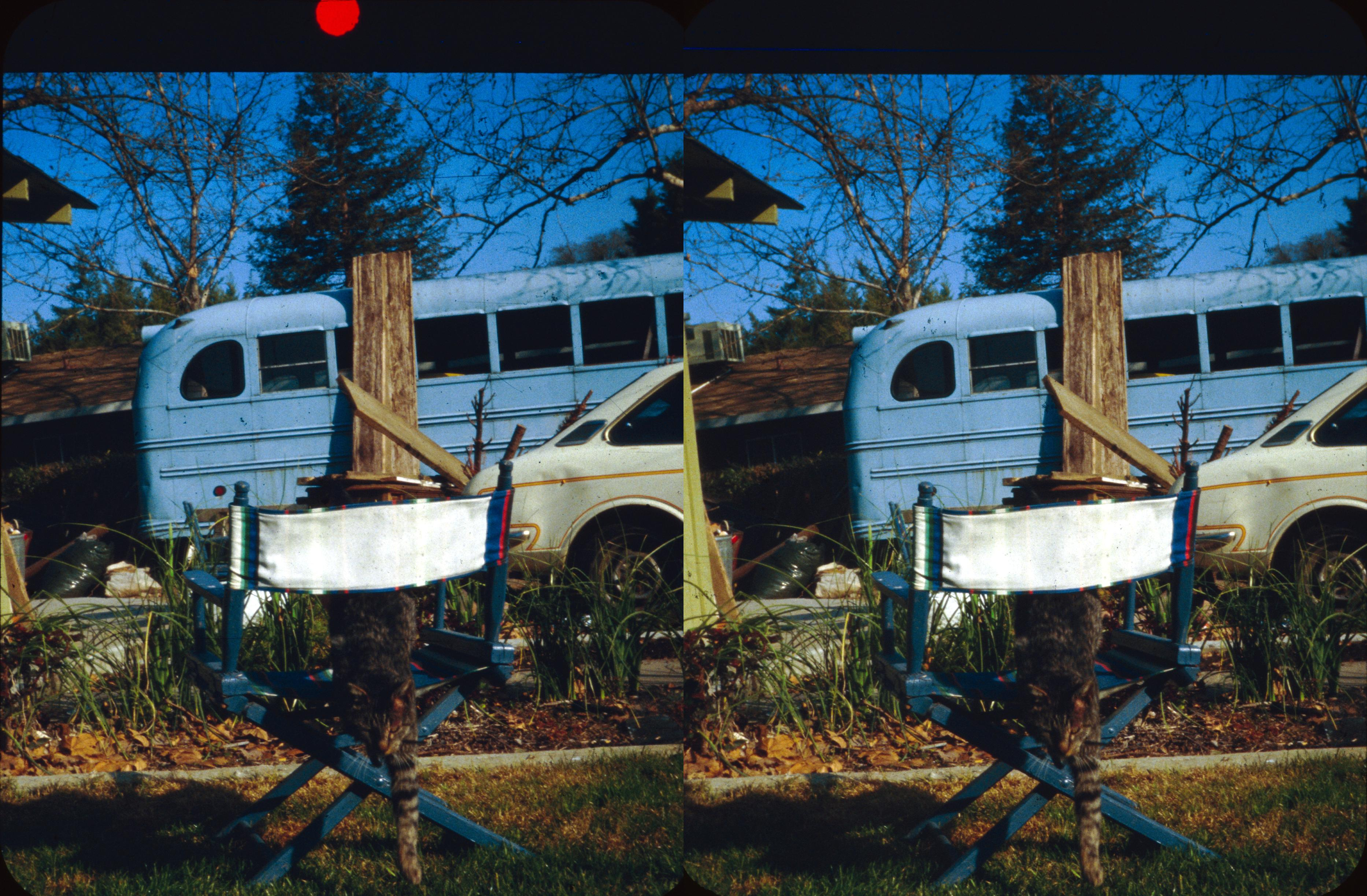
stereo pair taken with a Nimslo, note the red dot which would be green on negative film. This would normally be cropped out but was left in for illustration.

Despite the fact that Nimslo cameras are no longer produced, one can still obtain a Nimslo through various internet auction sites. In fact, the Nimslo maintains a loyal following among photography buffs. In most recent years, renewed interest in the 1981 Nimslo camera has created a growing online after-market for both the analog camera itself and Nimslo camera prints. This includes a large number of GIF images created using the Nimslo camera, which have proliferated for viewing online.

As of May 2012, there are no known labs that can make lenticular prints from film.

In a somewhat "retro" development, many stereo photography buffs used the Nimslo to take stereo slides which were mounted in "4P" (half frame) slide mounts. This was done by using either slip in cardboard mounts, some specially labeled with the Nimslo name or aluminum masks such as the Realist "closeup" mask. These masks were sometimes put in metal frames and placed between glass, much like Realist format slides. The resulting stereo slides could then be viewed using conventional Realist format viewers or even projected with stereo projectors.

The dot that was green on negatives was red on slide film and so stereo hobbyists could tell which chip was the left frame after cutting the film by looking for the red dot. Because many slide mounts were designed for an image frame taller than the Nimslo frame this red dot was sometimes visible in the picture.

The glass lenses and automatic exposure control of the Nimslo made it well suited for this purpose, unlike similar cameras such as the Nishika that typically sported plastic lenses and limited adjustability, relying on the latitude of the print film to give good results under varied lighting conditions.

Others used the Nimslo to produce half frame prints that could be used to make stereo cards which could be viewed in conventional stereoscopes.

Since only the two outer images of the four images formed by each snap were mounted, using an unmodified Nimslo to produce stereo pairs results in wasted film. Making prints is even more costly since half of them will be thrown away. The problem of paying for twice as many prints could be solved by covering the two center lenses, but that doesn't solve the problem of film wastage. This spurred some enterprising individuals to come up with modifications.

Technical Enterprises came out with the Teco-Nimslo which exposed two images at a time and modified the film advance so that there was no film wastage. This produced 24 half-frame pairs on a 24-exposure roll. The result was an ideal camera for those satisfied with half-frame format slides.

David Burder came up with more radical modifications. One, the original Burdlo, featured a modified lens board with two lenses but essentially the same film advance to take full-frame stereo pictures. The stereo base was greatly reduced to only 36mm, adequate for closeup work. Other cameras also going by the name Burdlo included multiple Nimslos joined together to make 12 lens and 24 lens lenticular cameras. None of these were as popular as the Teco-Nimslo but pictures of them are easy enough to find on the web and have occasionally been the subject of blog entries.

Others have modified the Nimslo to make a wide format camera, or have found other non 3D uses, with or without modification.
