= Petter Olsen =

Norwegian businessman (born 1948)

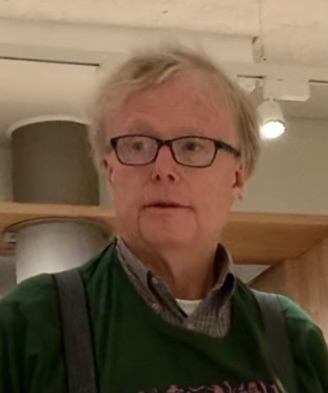
- Olson in 2021
- Born: 7 February 1948 (age 78)
- Other name: Petter Halfdan Rudolf Fredrik Olsen
- Occupation: Businessman

Petter Halfdan Rudolf Fredrik Olsen (born 7 February 1948) is a Norwegian businessman, former billionaire and member of the Olsen shipping family, who own Fred. Olsen & Co. He is the younger brother of the current leader of the company, Fredrik Olsen. His estate went bankrupt in October 2024.

Petter Olsen formerly owned one of the four versions of Edvard Munch's The Scream (1895), one of the world's most iconic works of art. The older brother, Fredrik Olsen, had been involved in a legal process against his younger brother concerning The Scream and other Munch works that had been collected by their father, Thomas Fredrik Olsen. According to the will of their mother, Henriette, the collection was to be left to the younger son. Fredrik Olsen disputed the will but lost the case in the Oslo District Court in 2001. Petter Olsen's version of The Scream was sold on 2 May 2012, selling for an auction record price of US$119.9 million, including fees and commission. Petter Olsen sold the painting to raise funds to build a museum in Hvitsten, Norway, where Munch once owned property and near where Olsen has an estate, to house the rest of his father's collection.

Olsen has been the patron of the British Shakespeare Company since 2006, when the Company began performing at Ramme Gaard, Olsen's ecological estate with an outdoor amphitheatre on the coast of Norway.
