= Thomas Fredrik Olsen =

Norwegian ship-owner

Thomas Fredrik Olsen (1897–1969) was a Norwegian ship-owner. Son of Fredrik Olsen and born in Hvitsten, he worked in the family company Fred. Olsen & Co. from 1920. He held a board position in a range of companies, including Det Norske Luftfartselskap and Scandinavian Airlines System. He is the father of shipping magnate Fred Olsen.

In 1941, he acquired the Waterbury Clock Company. He renamed the company Timex, a portmanteau of Time and Kleenex.

Olsen assembled a major personal collection of over 30 paintings by Norwegian artist Edvard Munch including one of the four versions of Munch's The Scream. During the Second World War, he chose to hide the works in a hay barn in central Norway after war had formally been declared, but before the German invasion of Norway in April 1940. The Scream remained there until the liberation in 1945. In gratitude to Britain for taking him in when he fled the Nazis, Olsen presented one of Munch's most notable paintings, The Sick Child, to the Tate Gallery. The collection was the subject of a legal dispute between Olsen's sons Fred Olsen and Petter Olsen following the death of Olsen's wife Henriette.

In 2012, on the occasion of a Munch exhibition at the MoMa, the family of German Jewish art collector Hugo Simon pointed out that he had owned The Scream in the 1920s and 1930s, before Simon was forced to flee Germany due to Nazi persecution.
