= British Shakespeare Company =

British open-air touring Shakespeare theatre company

The British Shakespeare Company was a British open-air touring Shakespeare Company. Founded by Robert J. Williamson in 1994 (as the R. J. Williamson Company), it was renamed in 2005. Originally based in Leeds (performing in the ruins of Kirkstall Abbey), the company later established Shakespeare festivals for Brighton, Nottingham, The Kew Gardens, Cannizaro Park in Wimbledon and Holland Park Theatre in central London.

The company produced two of Shakespeare's most commercially popular plays each year from 1994 to 2007, totalling over 700 performances, usually featuring household names from film, television and stage. These have included James Alexandrou from EastEnders, Liam Gerrard from Odd Squad, Pierce Brosnan's actor son Sean Brosnan, the dancer and performer Wayne Sleep, and the comedian Norman Pace. The 2007 shows, Henry V and As You Like It toured Norway, Windsor, Leeds and Oxford. In 2008 the company performed A Midsummer Night's Dream for two nights at Arundel Castle.

The company's last tour in 2009 starred Mark Arden, Louisa Lytton, Daniela Lavender, David Davies, Gabriel Thomson, Steven Blakeley and Robert J. Williamson. The company performed Much Ado About Nothing and A Midsummer Night's Dream. This was the BSC's largest tour, commencing at the Rose Theatre, Kingston, Trinity College, Dublin, Ramme Gaard in Norway, before visiting Gawsworth Hall in Cheshire, Norwich Cathedral, Kentwell Hall in Suffolk, Kirkstall Abbey in Leeds, Burgrave Palace in Prague, Sterts Theatre in Cornwall and Arundel Castle in West Sussex. Since this tour there has been no further activity by the company.

From 2006, when the company began performing at Ramme Gaard, an ecological estate with an outdoor amphitheatre on the coast of Norway, the Norwegian billionaire and philanthropist Petter Olsen was its patron.
