= Anette S. Olsen =

Norwegian businesswoman (born 1956)

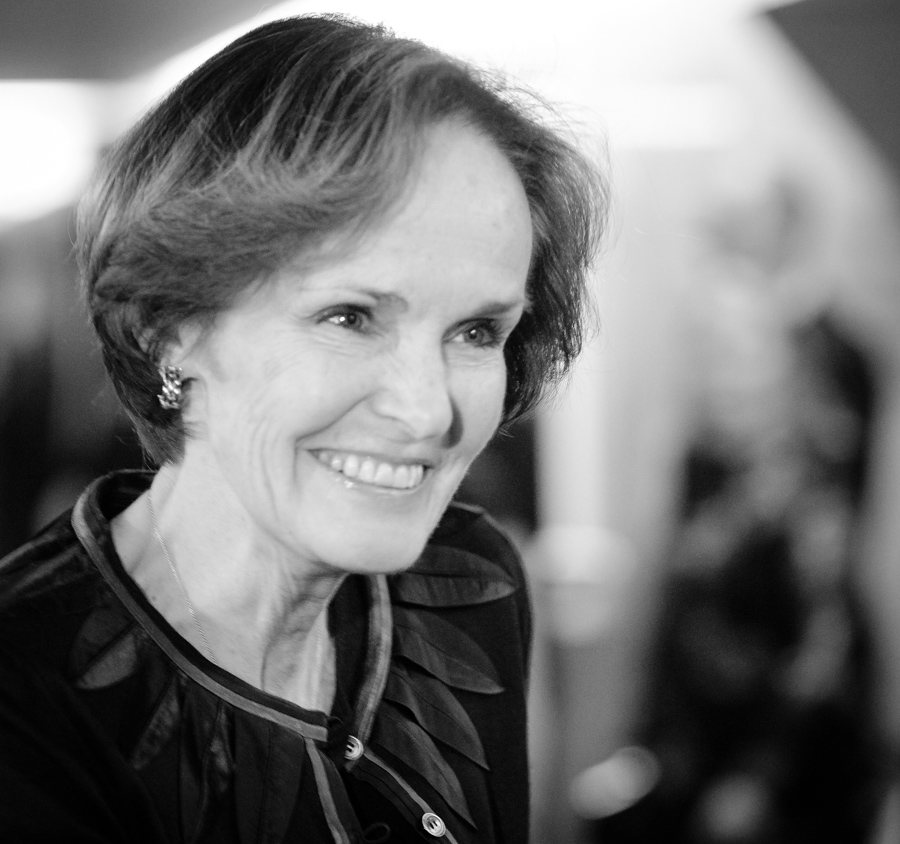
- Anette Olsen
- Born: 24 September 1956
- Awards: Norway's 100 Most Powerful Women 2020 (72); Norway's 100 Most Powerful Women 2011 (49); Norway's 100 Most Powerful Women 2010 (48); Norway's 100 Most Powerful Women 2008 (30); Norway's 100 Most Powerful Women 2009 (30); Norway's 100 Most Powerful Women 2012 (63)

Anette Sofie Olsen (born 24 September 1956) is a Norwegian businesswoman.

She holds siv.øk. and Master of Business Administration degrees. She is the sole proprietor of the shipping conglomerate Fred. Olsen & Co. and through this the controlling owner and chief executive officer of the public listed companies Bonheur and Ganger Rolf. She is also chairperson of the board of several other Fred. Olsen companies, including Norges Handels og Sjøfartstidende.

Anette Olsen is daughter of Fred. Olsen who is chairman of Bonheur and Ganger Rolf. Anette Olsen became partner of Fred. Olsen & Co. in 1993, which she has inherited from her father.

Her brother Thomas Frederick Olsen Jr. would leave the family company after stepping down as head of Fred. Olsen Cruise Lines in 2022, thus making Anette the sole child of Fred. Olsen to have a leadership role in Fred. Olsen & Co.
