= Keystone Camera Company =

Camera manufacturer active in the USA 1919-1991

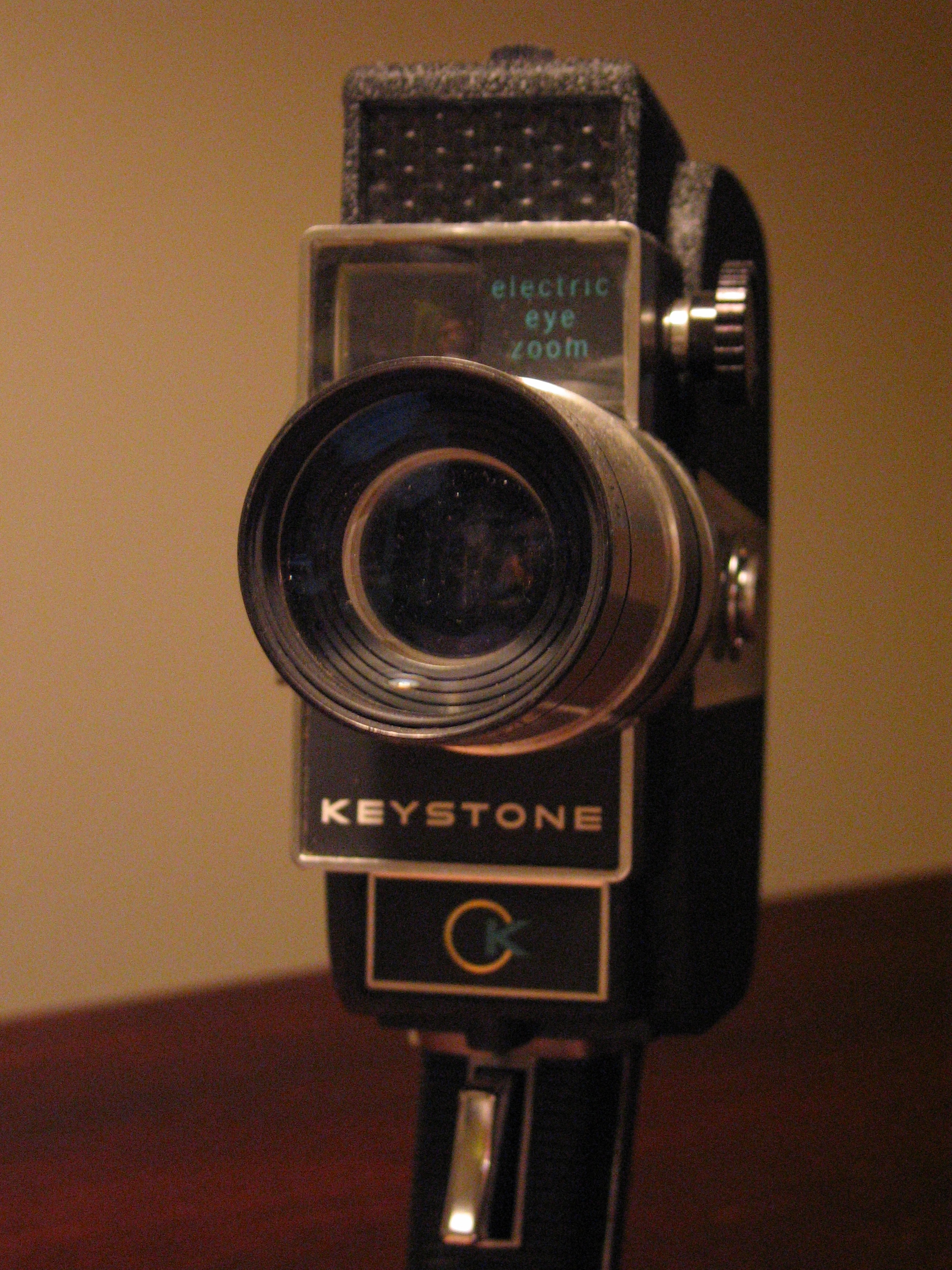
Keystone Standard 8 Movie Camera

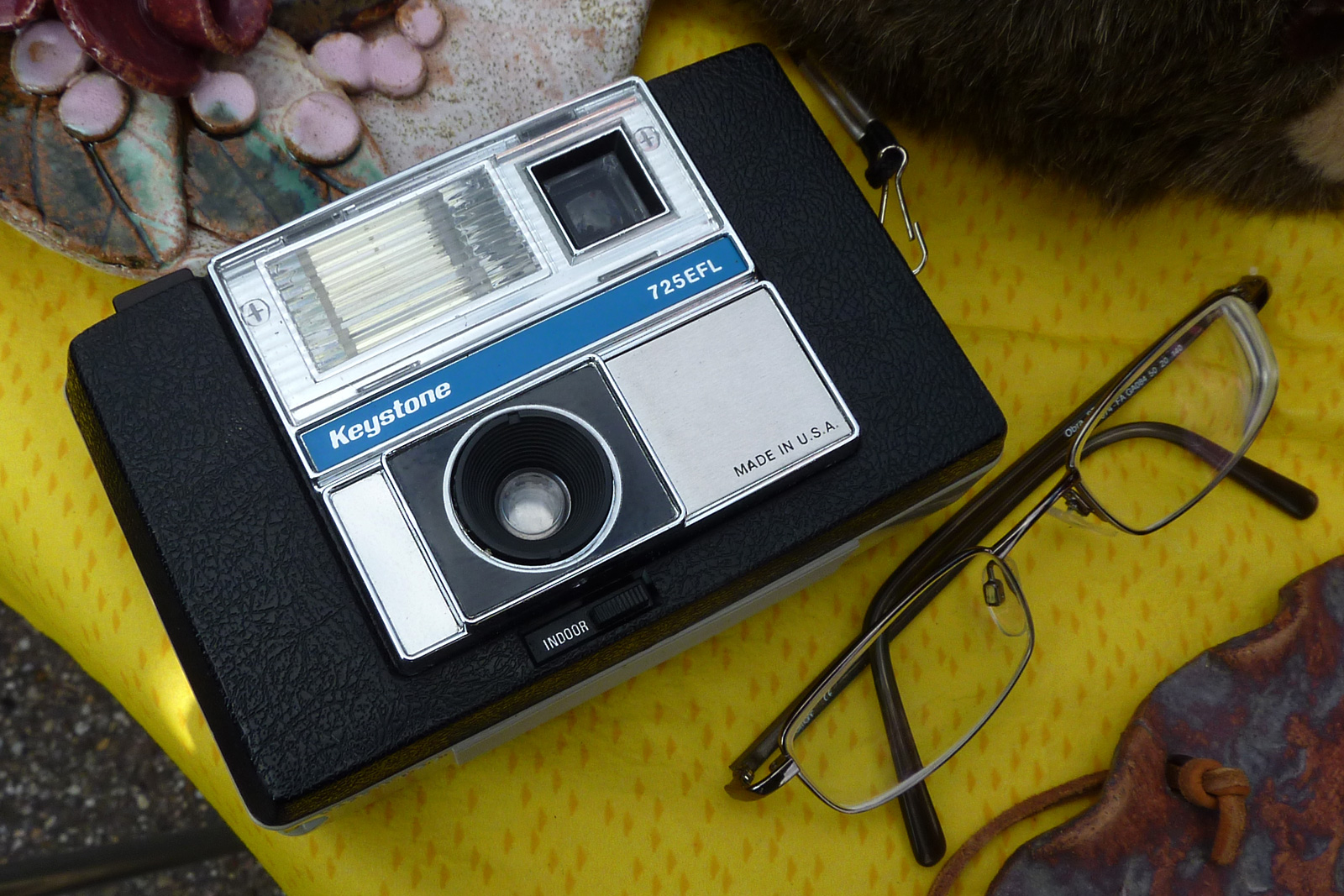
Keystone 725EFL camera with built-in electronic flash at a flea market in the year 2012 in Germany

The Keystone Camera Company was an American manufacturer of consumer photographic equipment that began in 1919 in Boston. Notable products were Movie cameras, 126 and 110 cameras with built-in electronic flash (the "Everflash" series).

In the 1930s, the firm built low cost 16mm cameras that are still in use today.

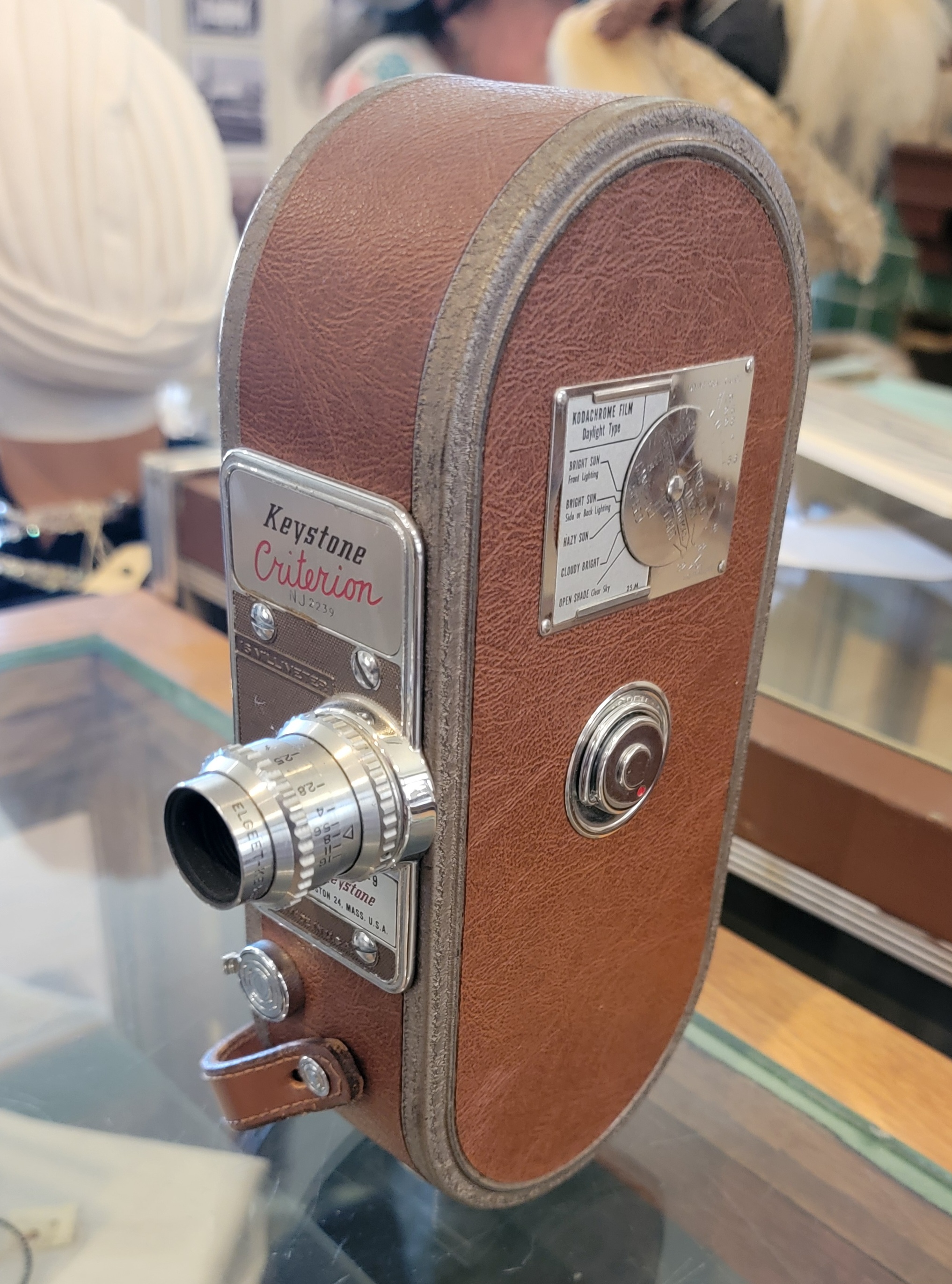
The Keystone Criterion A-9 movie camera was released in 1949.

The firm considered that labeling its products as Made in USA was an important part of its appeal.

One version of their movie camera line was the Capri K27, with 3 lenses and 9 settings for cloudy to sunny day conditions. This was a light, easy to use movie camera, and is considered a rare collectable today. The firm was originally located in Boston, MA and moved to Clifton, NJ when purchased by Berkey Photo in 1968.

In 1970 they began to manufacture the Everflash series of cameras in Clifton that accepted Kodak's new 126 cartridge film, and several years later Everflash cameras that handled the then new Kodak 110 cartridge film. Keystone cameras were distinctive for their built in electronic flash rather than having to use a flash bulb or flash cube, which was popular then on many other cameras. Poor internal management structure led to many quality problems in the early 1970s and serious losses. Keystone later added its instant picture Everflash camera using Polaroid film again stressing the Everflash feature rather than Polaroid's use of the Flash Bar.

From 1970 to 1977, Berkey accounted for 8.2% Of the sales in the camera market in the United States, reaching a peak of 10.2% In 1976. In 1978, Berkey sold its camera division and thus abandoned this market.

In July 1988, former parent company Berkey filed for Chapter 11 reorganization in federal bankruptcy court. Jac Holzman, who was the company's largest shareholder, said, "What was behind [the bankruptcy filing] was an accumulation of...ten years of corporate mismanagement". Keystone itself filed for Chapter 11 protection in January 1991.
