= Thomas Fredrik Olsen (born 1857) =

Norwegian businessman and ship owner

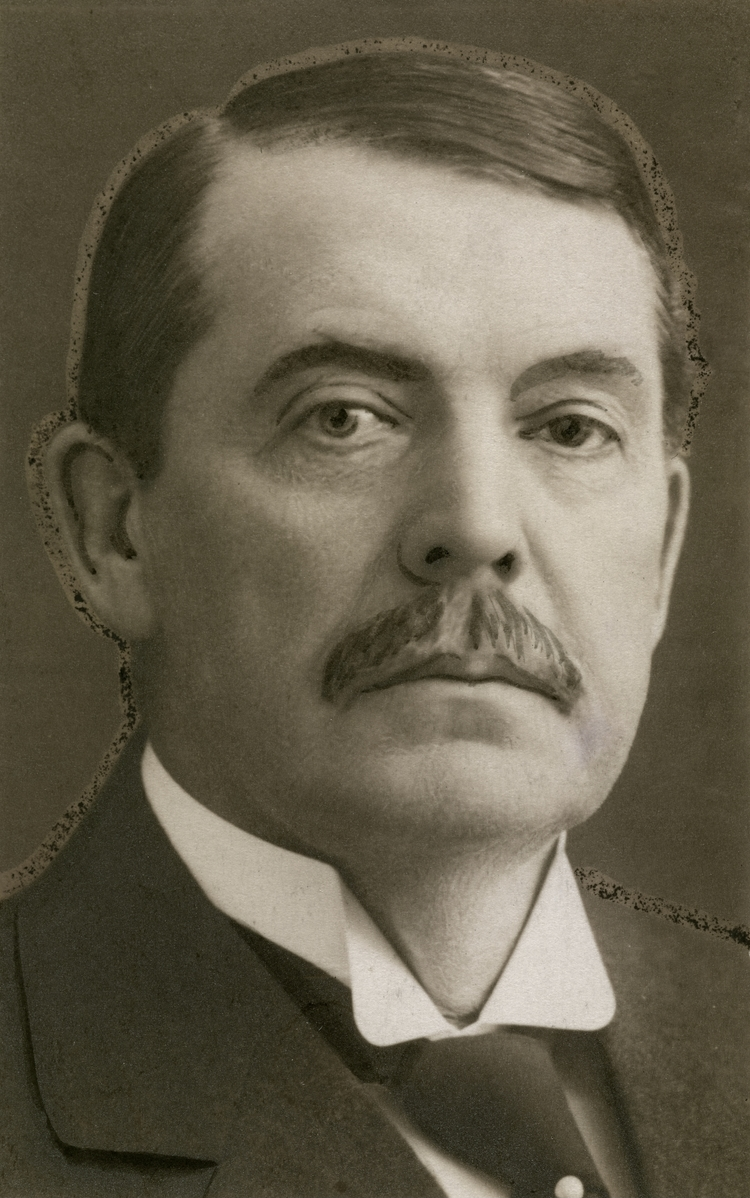
- Fred. Olsen ca. 1900
- Born: 15 October 1857; Filtvet
- Died: 29 January 1933 (aged 75); Oslo
- Occupation: Ship-owner
- Awards: Knight Grand Officer of the Order of Saint Olav (1931); Chevalier of the Legion of Honour

Thomas Fredrik Olsen (15 October 1857 – 29 January 1933) was a Norwegian businessman and ship owner of Fred. Olsen & Co.

Thomas Fredrik Olsen (commonly known as Fred. Olsen) was born in the village of Filtvet in Hurum municipality, Buskerud County, Norway. Olsen was the son of ship owner Petter Olsen (1821-1899), the father of Gösta Hammarlund, and the grandfather of Fredrik Olsen. He took over as the owner of two of his father's sailing ships, and later invested in steam ships. Fred. Olsen took the company from a small business with a few boats into a powerful multinational shipping and ship building business. Olsen was the major shareholder of the workshop Akers Mek. At the time of his death his company, Fred. Olsen & Co., owned 65 ships. After Fred. Olsen's death, his sons Rudolf Olsen and Thomas Olsen took over the company.

Fred. Olsen was a prominent sailor, and won the Kiel Regatta in 1895. He was decorated Knight, First Class of the Royal Norwegian Order of St. Olav in 1911, and Commander, First Class in 1931. He was also named Chevalier of the Legion of Honor.
