= Fred. Olsen Production =

Norwegian gas and oil company

Fred. Olsen Production ASA
- Company type: Private
- Industry: Petroleum
- Founded: 1994
- Headquarters: Oslo, Norway
- Key people: Morten Lunde (CEO); Per-Oscar Lund
- Products: Floating Production Storage and Offloading
- Website: www.fpso.no

Fred. Olsen Production is a Norwegian offshore floating production petroleum company. Founded in 2004, the company has its headquarters in Oslo, Norway and was listed on the Oslo Stock Exchange from May 11, 2007 until January 20, 2014. The company's largest owners are Bonheur and Ganger Rolf through First Olsen, owning 61.5% of the company. The companies are controlled by the Olsen family. The firm has offices in Oslo; Houston, United States; Singapore; and Port Harcourt, Nigeria.

The company owns and operates three Floating Production Storage and Offloading vessels (FPSOs), two Floating Storage and Offloading vessels (FSOs) and one production jack-up (MOPU). The company is also converting one suezmax tanker to FPSO and an addition tanker available for conversion. Operations are located in Western Africa and the Red Sea. Among the vessels was Knock Nevis, the world's largest ship, which was created from the tanker previously known as Seawise Giant.
