= Omega (photographic brand) =

Omega is the brand name of several medium-format cameras that were initially developed and sold by Simmon Brothers starting from 1954, then licensed to and manufactured by Konica and then Mamiya from 1964 until 1981, when the line was discontinued.

Simmon Brothers originally had used the Omega brand for a line of enlargers, introduced in 1939 and discontinued in 2014. Omega became an independent brand for the enlargers after Simmon Brothers were folded into the Berkey Photo conglomerate in 1961. Omega enlargers can be recognized by their distinctive, slanted enlarger head support.

Under Berkey, Omega also marketed a line of view cameras, the Omega View 45, which were built by Sakai Special Mfg. Co. in Japan as the Toyo-View and rebranded by Berkey.

== Cameras ==
=== Rangefinders ===
Alfred Simmon received a design patent in 1953 for the "Simmon Camera". The Simmon Brothers, better known at the time for their line of enlargers, built the original Simmon Omega cameras in the United States starting from 1954. These rangefinder cameras used 120 roll film, capturing images with the 6×7 "ideal format" frame size. The Omega 120 camera was equipped with a fixed Omicron 90 mm f/3.5 lens designed by Wollensak with four elements; it was designed to facilitate rapid operation as a press camera, using a large focusing knob and combined push/pull film transport lever that also served to cock the leaf shutter for the right hand and a shutter release for the left hand. A flashbulb accessory was available which had a rotary turret accepting six bulbs. Keeping with the rapid operation theme, the turret was mechanically linked to the film transport lever, automatically advancing a fresh bulb to the reflector as the film was advanced.

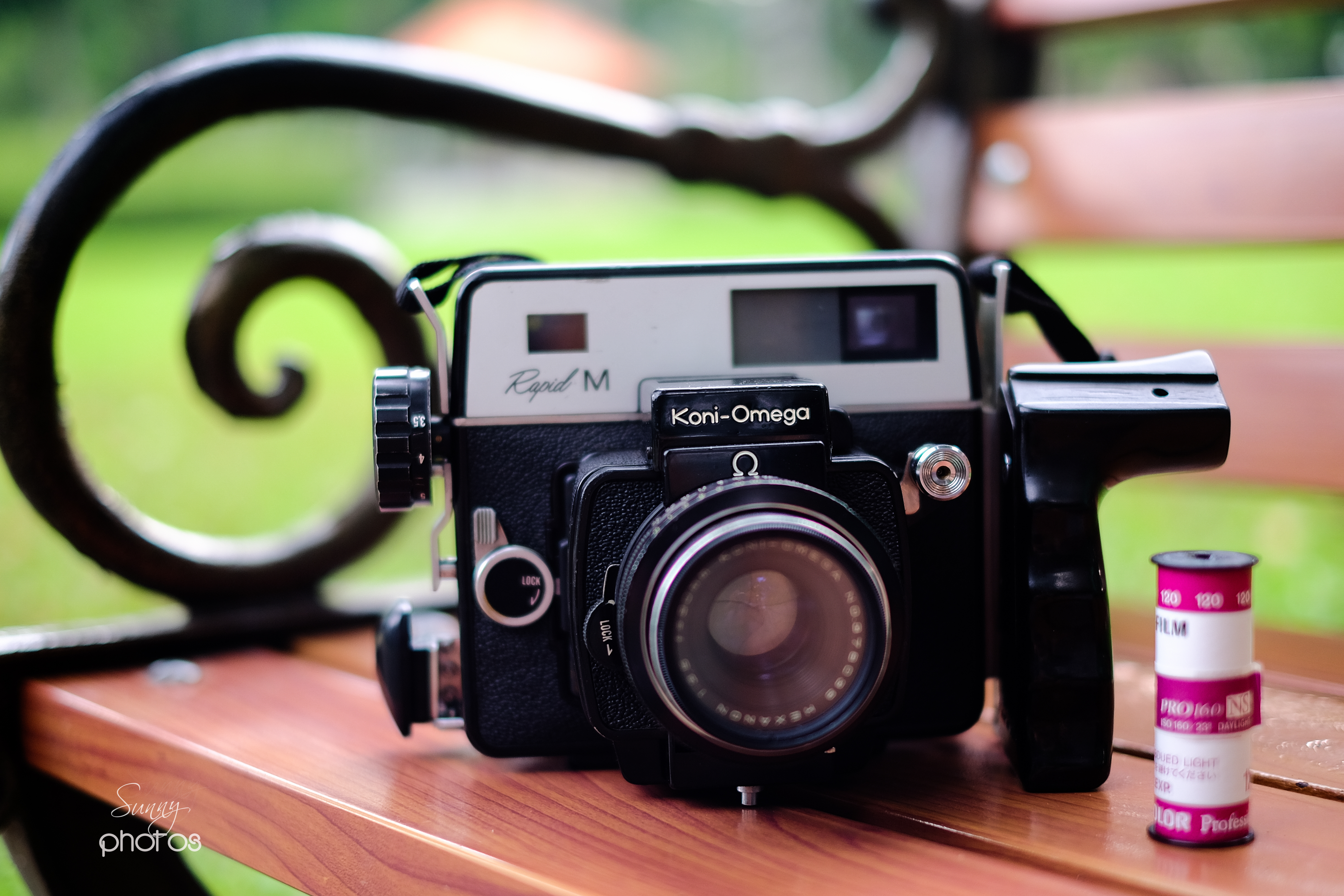
Koni-Omega Rapid M rangefinder camera

Simmon Brothers was merged into Berkey Photo in 1961. Shortly thereafter, the design was licensed to Konica, another company marketed in the United States by Berkey, and manufactured in modified form as the Koni-Omega line between 1964 and 1975, which included the Koni-Omega Rapid (introduced in 1964 and sold in Japan as the Konica Press) and Rapid M (1968). Both cameras accepted the same set of Hexanon-branded interchangeable lenses, including the standard (Tessar-type) 90 mm f/3.5, wide-angle (Super-Angulon-type) 60 mm f/5.6, and telephoto (Sonnar-type) 180 mm f/4.5. The 60 mm lens was replaced by a reformulated 58 mm lens and a 135 mm portrait lens was added around 1970.

The bulkier Rapid M was designed to accept interchangeable film magazines with a dark slide, permitting mid-roll changes and off-camera loading, while the Rapid was fitted with a detachable back. Because the Rapid did not have a dark slide, it was fitted with a safety blind to allow lens changes without fogging the film; both cameras had provisions to lock out the lens release lever if the dark slide or safety blind was not engaged. The magazine back for the Rapid M had two parts: a conventional film transport and rollfilm holder, and a front cover that included a slot for the dark slide.

The last models, branded as Rapid Omega and bearing an all-black finish, were produced by Mamiya in the same factory, including the Rapid Omega 100 and 200 (both introduced in 1975), which were similar to the Rapid and Rapid M, respectively. Production ceased in 1981. This line shared the same interchangeable lenses with the preceding Koni-Omega line, although they were rebranded as Super Omegon rather than Hexanon. The magazine back introduced with the Rapid M was used for both the 100 and 200, but on the 100, the front portion of the magazine was permanently fixed to the body, so it was unable to accommodate mid-roll changes.

A close-up adapter was popular with wedding photographers for portraits. The line also was sold to the United States Army, which designated it "Still Picture Camera, Type KE-58".

Lenses are fitted with a leaf shutter that supports M- (flashbulb) and X- (electronic flash) synchronization via a PC terminal, up to the minimum shutter speed of 1/500 second.

Koni/Rapid Omega lenses
Focal length	Aperture	Construction		Min. focus	Angle of view	Filter	Notes
Focal length	Aperture	Ele.	Grp.	Min. focus	Angle of view	Filter	Notes
58 mm	f/5.6–32	8	4	42 in (1.1 m)	75.4°	Series VIII	Symmetric design similar to improved Super-Angulon
60 mm	f/5.6–32	6	4	42 in (1.1 m)	73.5°	Series VIII	Symmetric design similar to original Super-Angulon
90 mm	f/3.5–32	4	3	39 1/2 in (1.00 m)	52.9°	Series VI	Design similar to Tessar
135 mm	f/3.5–32	6	5	90 in (2.3 m)	36.7°	Series VII	Design similar to Sonnar
180 mm	f/4.5–32	5	4	12 ft (3.7 m)	28°	Series VII	Design similar to Sonnar

=== Twin-lens reflex ===
Konica extended its market with another line, the Koni-Omegaflex M in 1968, which was a twin-lens reflex camera that also took 6×7 rectangular pictures on 120 roll film.

The two-piece Omegaflex film magazine is identical to the magazine used by the Rapid M and 200; the rear (film transport) piece can be interchanged with the 100 (also sold as the Konica Press 2 in Japan). The front piece integrates a dark slide and permits mid-roll changes on the Omegaflex, Rapid M, and 200. The earlier Koni-Omega Rapid (Konica Press in Japan) film back is not compatible with the Koni/Rapid Omega film magazine system, and does not permit mid-roll changes.

Although the lenses for the Omegaflex shared the same design as their counterparts for the Koni-Omega, the Hexanon lenses for Omegaflex were packaged as a twin-lens unit and were not interchangeable with those from the Omega line. Likewise, most other accessories were not interchangeable with those from the Omega line.

=== View camera ===
Under Berkey, view cameras were sold in the United States as the Omega View 45. The cameras were built by Sakai Special Camera Mfg. Co. in Japan and marketed elsewhere as the Toyo-View; Sakai also built a field camera, which was sold as the Toyo-Field. By 1985, Omega-branded view cameras were being marketed by Berkey alongside Toyo-branded view and field cameras.

Distribution of the Toyo line in the United States was acquired by Mamiya America Corporation after Berkey went bankrupt; Sakai stopped manufacturing cameras in 2002, but As of 2023, the Toyo-Field 45AX camera is still available.

== Enlargers ==
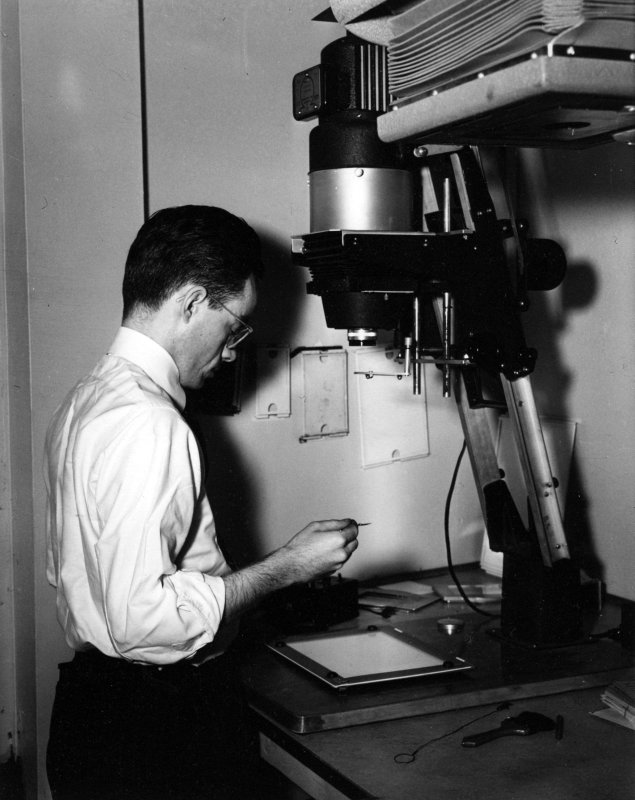
Working with an Omega D2 enlarger, c. 1950.

The first Omega-branded enlarger sold by Simmon Brothers was the Omega B, introduced in 1937. Eventually, a complete line of enlargers and darkroom instruments were produced. The letter designation in the enlarger model number provided the maximum film size that was accepted:

- A = 35 mm film
- B = 6×6 (2 1/4×2 1/4 in.)
- C = 3 1/4×3 1/4 in.
- D = 4×5 in.
- E = 5×7 in.
- F = 8×10 in.

After the eponymous Simmon brothers retired in the early 1960s, the company was folded into Berkey Photo by 1964 as the Simmon-Omega division. Berkey went bankrupt in the late 1980s and Omega was purchased by RT Corporation and rebranded to RT/Omega (1988), then Omega/Arkay (after acquiring Arkay, 1990), Omega/Satter (after acquiring Satter, 1995), and finally Omega/Brandess (2010). No new Omega enlargers were developed after 1979, and the company quietly discontinued enlarger production in 2014.
