= Gösta Hammarlund =

Norwegian illustrator and journalist

- Born: 30 January 1903; Stockholm, Sweden
- Died: 12 July 1987 (aged 84)
- Education: Oslo Commerce School
- Occupations: Illustrator and journalist
- Employer: Dagbladet
- Father: Thomas Fredrik Olsen
- Awards: Narvesen Prize (1956)

Gösta Hammarlund (30 January 1903 – 12 July 1987) was a Norwegian illustrator and journalist.

== Biography ==
Gustav Harald Hammarlund was born in Stockholm, Sweden. He was the son of ship owner Thomas Fredrik Olsen (1857-1933). He grew up in Stockholm with the Hammarlund family. He came to Norway as a 13 year old and started at Halling Skole at Kristiania (now Oslo). In 1922, he graduated from Oslo Commerce School (Oslo Handelsgymnasium). He worked as an office manager in the shipping business of his father until 1937. He started working for the newspaper Dagbladet with his own daily comic strip in 1940. From the early 1950s, he had a daily column on Dagbladet's third page. In the post-World War II period, he initiated a working relationship with sports editor Jørgen Juve (1906–1983) which resulted in drawings and portraits for weekly Saturday interviews in Dagbladet.

Among his books are the novel Møte med fru Brontze from 1939 and Berømte elskovspar from 1951. He illustrated several books by other writers. He was awarded the Narvesen Prize (Narvesenprisen) in 1956 and the Oslo Cultural Prize (Oslo kommunes kulturpris) in 1977.

Awards
Preceded by Anders Buraas	Recipient of the Narvesen Prize; 1955	Succeeded by Asbjørn Barlaup
