= First Olsen Tankers =

Shipping company

First Olsen Ltd, until 2005 known as First Olsen Tankers, is a Norwegian shipping company owned by Bonheur and affiliated with Fred. Olsen & Co. The company is registered in Bermuda and headquartered in Oslo. The company was established in 1993 and remained listed on Oslo Stock Exchange from then to 1999. It bought Fred. Olsen Marine Services in 2005. As of 2011 it operates two suezmax tankers, one very large crude carrier and two suezmax converted to floating production storage and offloading units.

First Olsen Tankers owned the largest ultra large crude carrier ever built, Knock Nevis, built in 1979 by Sumitomo Heavy Industries that operated as a floating storage and offloading unit until she was scrapped in 2010.
