= David Davies (English actor) =

British actor

David Davies is an English actor best known for his portrayal of Shakespeare's characters and for playing leading parts when he was the Company Manager of The GB Theatre Company.

== Early life ==
Davies was born on 12 February, and moved from Hounslow, London with his family to Perth, Western Australia. He studied acting at The National Institute of Art, (NIDA) in Sydney where he was the first male student to play Hamlet. He graduated with a Diploma in Acting in the mid 1990s.

== Career ==
He played Hamlet again for The Hole in the Wall Theatre Company, directed by Raymond Omedei. Other early work includes Silly Cow and Gasping for The Perth Theatre Company, both productions written by Ben Elton and directed by Alan Becher. Television credits at this time include Stingers, The Sleepover Club and many projects with Soul Films under the direction of Martin Wilson.

From 2001 to 2006, Davies was an ensemble member of Bell Shakespeare, directed by John Bell. He played in Julius Caesar, Antony and Cleopatra, The Comedy of Errors, Hamlet and The Wars of the Roses. Richard III was directed by Michael Gow.

Davies returned to London in 2006 to continue his work with the Bard in The British Shakespeare Company. In 2010 he started as an Actor and Company Manager with GB Theatre Company. He has taken parts with them ever since in Dublin, Norway, The Czech Republic and the UK. Roles include Jacques, Ford, Mercutio, Friar Lawrence, Sir Toby Belch. He has also directed The Winter's Tale and written several plays. From 2011-12 David Davies was the Baron in Sheringham Little Theatre's 'Dick Whittington.' The Little Theatre are to perform 'Little Shop of Horrors' in late September. In 2012 he toured internationally as Petruchio in The Taming of the Shrew and was directed by Jack Shepherd, (Wycliffe) as Antonio in The Tempest. He started 2013 with Benedick in Much Ado About Nothing directed by Paige Newmark for Shakespeare WA where the press described him as dominating the production. Since 2014 Davies has been touring his one-man adaptation of Robert Louis Stevenson's Dr Jekyll and Mr Hyde as Hyde-the final statement of Dr Jekyll and has received good reviews in Germany.
