= Berkey Photo =

Former American photographic equipment distributor

Berkey Photo was an American photographic equipment distributor and photo developer that operated from 1932, when it was founded by Benjamin Berkey, until 1988, when it declared bankruptcy. Brands distributed by Berkey include Gossen, Keystone, Konica, Omega, Rodenstock, and Slik.

== Corporate history ==
Benjamin Berkey emigrated to the United States from Ukraine in 1911, and shortly after graduating from City College in 1932, purchased a 50% stake in a photographic studio on the Lower East Side of New York by taking a loan of US$300 (equivalent to $6,900 in 2024) from his mother.

Berkey Photo provided mainly black-and-white film processing and printing services, as the color photography market was dominated by Eastman Kodak, which sold its color film bundled with pre-paid processing to access its proprietary photofinishing services. In 1954, an antitrust consent decree barred Kodak from tying color film and processing together at the point of sale, allowing competitors into the market for color film processing. With the appropriate licenses from Kodak, Berkey Photo began processing color film in 1956 and eventually became its largest competitor. By 1979, Berkey was processing more 126 and 110 film than Kodak. However, Berkey felt that Kodak's dominance in selling film, print paper, and cameras still gave it a virtual monopoly in violation of the Sherman Act, and he filed suit in 1973, winning an $87 million judgment for treble damages in 1978. Kodak appealed, and the award was reversed by the United States Court of Appeals for the Second Circuit in 1979, which marked a new precedent in the awarding of damages for antitrust suits.

After the lawsuit, Berkey sold off several divisions, including graphic arts, to Pako, and professional lighting (Colortran) to Forward Technology Industries, both in 1981. Founder Benjamin Berkey retired in 1982 and died in 1984, aged 73. At the time, Berkey Photo also included a large retail store in Manhattan: Willoughby and Peerless Camera. In July 1988, Berkey filed for Chapter 11 reorganization in federal bankruptcy court. Jac Holzman, who was the company's largest shareholder, said, "What was behind [the bankruptcy filing] was an accumulation of...ten years of corporate mismanagement".

== Brands ==
- Gossen (light meters)
- Keystone (cameras)
- Konica (cameras)
- Nimslo (cameras)
- Olympus (cameras)
- Omega (enlargers and cameras)
- Rodenstock (lenses)
- Rollei (cameras)
- Sakai (view camera)
