= Fredrik Olsen =

Norwegian businessman (born 1929)

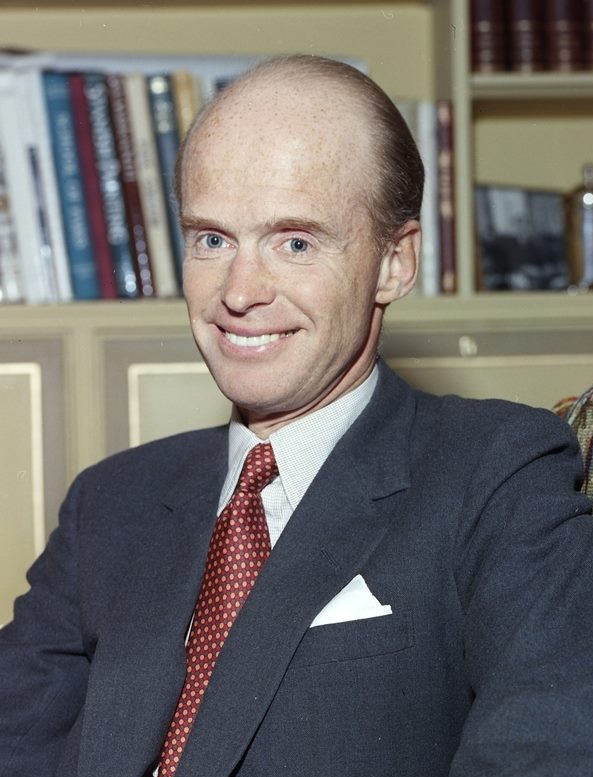
- Olsen in 1970
- Born: Thomas Fredrik Olsen; 1 January 1929 (age 97)
- Occupations: Businessman, shipping magnate

Thomas Fredrik Olsen (born 1 January 1929) is a Norwegian shipping magnate and Chairman of the companies in the Fred. Olsen & Co. company. He is the fourth generation running the Fred. Olsen Group, founded by his great grandfather Petter Olsen and named after his grandfather Thomas Fredrik Olsen. Though he remains the chairman of the companies, ownership and CEO functions are retained by his daughter Anette S. Olsen. In addition to his jobs within the Fred. Olsen group he was for a period also chairman of the Aker Group.

Fred Olsen has been called "The Norwegian Howard Hughes" for his great wealth and avoidance of publicity.

It was announced on 3 January 2006, that Fred Olsen was to sell almost his entire collection of Edvard Munch paintings; the auction through Sotheby's London fetched almost £17m. Olsen has previously been involved in a legal dispute with his younger brother, Petter Olsen, concerning the important Munch collection brought together by their father Thomas Fredrik Olsen; according to the will of their mother Henriette Olsen, they were to be left to the younger son. Fred Olsen contested the will but lost the case in the Oslo District Court in 2001. In 2022, Olsen's son Thomas Fredrik Olsen Jr. left Fred. Olsen & Co. after 35 years following his departure as head of Fred. Olsen Cruise Lines.

He is a fellow of the Norwegian Academy of Technological Sciences.
