= Anders Buraas =

Norwegian journalist and author (1915–2010)

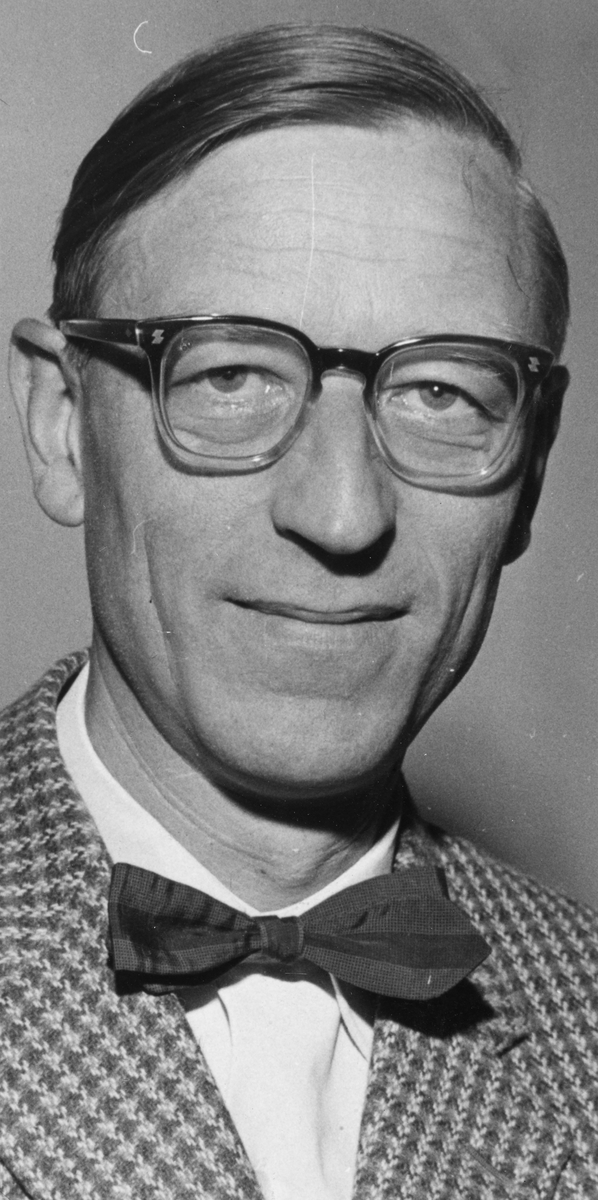
Anders von Tangen Buraas

Anders von Tangen Buraas (26 September 1915 – 7 May 2010) was a Norwegian journalist and author.

== Biography ==
He was born in Kristiania (now Oslo), Norway. He was a son of editor and attorney Carl Ludvig Buraas (1870–1933) and Dagny von Tangen (1874–1936). He finished his secondary education at Oslo Commerce School (Oslo handelsgymnasium) in 1933, and was hired as an office clerk in the newspaper Aftenposten. He remained here until 1941, when he had to flee to Sweden because he was involved in Norwegian resistance movement to the German occupation of Norway which had started in 1940. He worked in the press office of the Norwegian legation in Stockholm before being transferred to London, where the Norwegian government-in-exile sat. In 1945, after the liberation of Norway at the end of World War II, he became London correspondent of Arbeiderbladet.

From 1949 to 1952 he worked in Norway, from 1952 to 1954 he was a correspondent in Washington DC. He was awarded the first Narvesen Prize (Narvesenprisen) in 1954. He was a sub-editor in Arbeiderbladet from 1954 to 1958. He then went to the Norwegian Broadcasting Corporation in 1958 during the earliest days of television in Norway. He was information director at European Free Trade Association (EFTA) stationed in Washington D.C. from 1961 to 1962, information director of the Scandinavian Airlines System from 1963 to 1966 and information director at EFTA stationed in Geneva from 1966 to 1970. He became a freelance journalist in 1970 and remained in Switzerland for the rest of his life.

In 1972 he released the book Fly over fly. Historien om SAS, remade in English as The Making of SAS. A Triumvirate in World Aviation in 1973. He also wrote journalistic books such as Typisk amerikansk (1954) and Hit og dit i Sovjet (1975). More biographical works followed with De reiste ut (1982) and Labben fra Grønland: Harald Herlufsen about Norwegian cyclist Harald Herlufsen in 1982. His 1985 book Sverige tur-retur. Beretningen om flyktningene som ble soldater chronicled Norwegian refugees in Sweden during World War II.

== Personal life ==
In 1945, he married British citizen Janette Margaret Watson Maxwell (1920–2001). He died in May 2010 at Montreux, Switzerland.

Awards
Preceded by first recipient	Recipient of the Narvesen Prize; 1954	Succeeded by Gösta Hammarlund
