= 2022 Paria diving disaster =

Death of a group of divers in 2022

Coordinates: 10.317°N 61.466°W

The Paria diving disaster was an incident in February 2022 in which a group of five divers working on underwater piping at Paria Fuel Trading Company's Pointe-à-Pierre facility in the Gulf of Paria, Trinidad and Tobago, were sucked into a pipeline from a hyperbaric chamber.

One diver managed to escape and received medical assistance, while the remaining four divers died shortly after, with no attempt being made to rescue them due to safety concerns of going back underwater.

A subsequent commission of enquiry appointed by the government of Trinidad and Tobago concluded that the deaths of the divers were due to "gross [...] and consequently criminal" negligence and made recommendations that charges be laid for corporate manslaughter.

== Events ==
Land and Marine Contracting Services Ltd (LMCS) was contracted by state-owned fuel importer Paria Fuel Trading Company to complete miscellaneous repairs to offshore pipes and jetties at its Pointe-à-Pierre facility.

Five divers were employed by LMCS to complete the works: Yusuf Henry (age 31), Fyzal Kurban (57), Christopher Boodram (40), Rishi Nagassar (48), and Kazim Ali Jr. (36), who was the son of LMCS managing director Kazim Ali Sr.

At around 3:00 pm on 25 February 2022, while working on an offshore oil pipeline near berth #6 at a depth of 18 metres, all five divers were sucked into and became trapped in the pipeline they were working on.

Unbeknownst to the divers, differential pressure (Δ𝑃) had been created when the pipe was cleared of oil nearly a month earlier. While the divers were removing an inflatable plug, they got sucked into a vortex that pulled them into the oil pipe. The pressure differential created a powerful suction when the pipe was suddenly opened and caused all five divers to be violently pulled inside.

Christopher Boodram was able to escape by crawling down the pipe for around three hours. Hope remained that air pockets might enable the other divers to survive, though the air quality was likely poor. Rescue attempts were delayed by an attempt to position a water pump that failed when its lifting cable snapped. Five days later, the men's bodies were recovered — Ali, Henry, and Kurban on February 28, and Nagassar on 3 March 2022.

A GoPro camera was recovered from one of the deceased divers. Audio recordings from the camera show that all the men survived being sucked into the pipe, and in the audio they are heard praying and comforting each other.

== Rescue and aftermath ==
Soon after the initial incident, relatives of the victims responded to emergency distress calls. There had been no official initiative for any kind of rescue so local divers and families of the victims joined as an impromptu rescue team. Using an umbilical, one diver was able to descend 15m inside the pipe where he discovered a badly injured Christopher Boodram in an air-pocket, who survived after crawling near the entrance with only 6 inches of breathing room. Additional sounds were heard deeper within the pipe and the team made multiple dives, finding only missing diving gear, before reportedly being stopped by Paria officials.

The families of many of the victims were denied access into the main Paria compound and were uninformed of the current status of the victims. The families were not addressed until the following day. Reportedly, the Coast guard and Paria did not deploy remote cameras to search the pipes until 12 hours after the initial incident and refused entry unless the contents of the pipes were pumped out.

Following the disaster, the sole survivor, Christopher Boodram, stated he suffered severe psychological trauma ranging from flashbacks, nightmares, and anxiety attacks. Since the incident, Boodram stated he now has a deep fear of the water and can no longer provide for his family without an income. Additionally, Boodram stated he did not receive any of the money Paria was meant to pay LMCS for the maintenance contract they had or any other kinds of compensation.

== Investigation and litigation ==
Trinidad and Tobago's cabinet initially appointed a five-member team to investigate the incident, but eventually appointed a Commission of Enquiry due to public criticism.

In April 2022 the government appointed a Commission of Enquiry, chaired by former head of Jamaica's Appeal Court, Justice Cecil Dennis Morrison QC. Local subsea specialist Gregory Wilson was also appointed as a commissioner. Morrison resigned for personal reasons in June 2022 and was replaced by Jamaican lawyer Jerome Lynch QC. Their terms of reference included 13 guiding points with the result being making observations, findings and recommendations into whether there was any breach of duty or criminal liability, what should be the appropriate practices going forward, what policies should be implemented and any other recommendations deemed necessary.

Paria admitted they had no rescue plan, citing that they had 'no legal responsibility to rescue the men'. Further external attempts to save the men were reportedly blocked by Paria with arguments being made that the divers could not be rescued safely.

The Commission of Enquiry's report, released in November 2023 found that "Paria's negligence could be characterised as gross negligence and consequently criminal". Additionally, the Commission of Enquiry examined the responses and actions of both the Paria Fuel Trading Company and LMCS and determined that both parties had a duty to protect and aid for the safety of the victims. In their report, the Commission cited around 11 points during the incident in which they deemed Paria liable for their lack of initiative and resolve to make proper rescue efforts. They recommended that the Director of Public Prosecutions "consider charging Paria with what is commonly known as Corporate Manslaughter".

In September 2024, charges were laid against Paria, LMCS, and key individuals – Paria's general manager Mushtaq Mohammed, its terminal operations manager Collin Piper, and LMCS director Kazim Ali Sr (the father of one of the victims) – with proceedings initiated before both the Industrial Court and a Magistrate's Court. The charges came more than two years after the incident and, when they appeared in court the companies and individuals all pleaded not guilty to the charges. Whether the prosecutions are able to go forward may depend on the outcome of another case currently before the Privy Council regarding the interpretation of time limits on filing charges under the Occupational Health and Safety Act. Section 93 mandates that a complaint be filed within six months of the issue coming to the OSH Authority's attention; however, section 97(B) states that all proceedings under the Act should be initiated no more than two years after the cause of action arose.

The families of Rishi Naggasar, Fyzal Kurban and Yusuf Henry as well as survivor Christopher Boodram have filed lawsuits against LMCS and Paria for negligence. An additional workmen's compensation claim, brought in behalf of Fyzal Kurban's widow, has been halted pending the outcome of the negligence claims.
