= Ramme Gaard =

Norwegian organic farm and country estate

Coordinates: 59°36′33″N 10°39′19″E

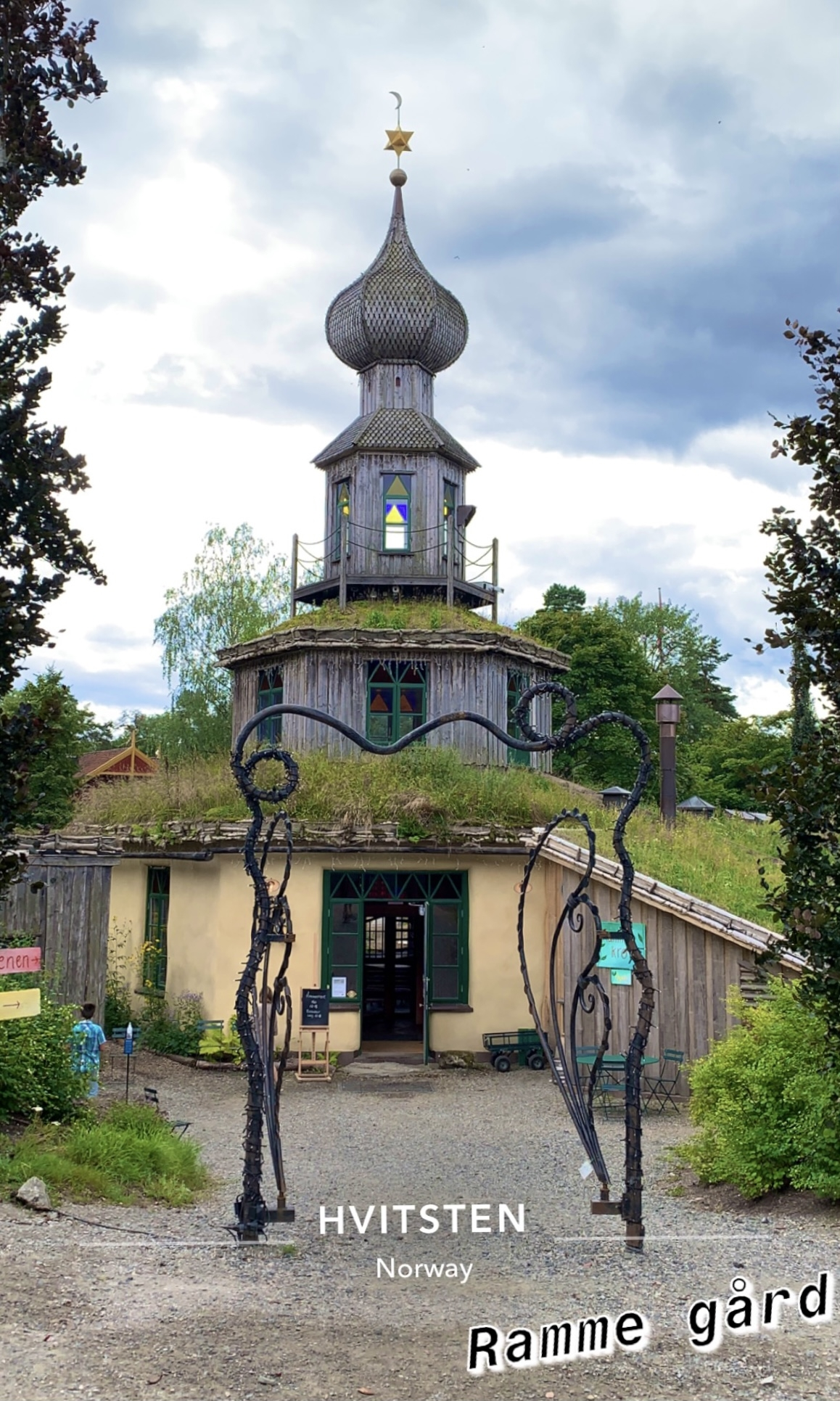
Ramme Gaard Cafe

Ramme Gaard is an organic farm and country estate located by the Oslofjord, just north of Hvitsten in the Vestby municipality of Akershus, Norway. Ramme Gaard was previously owned by billionaire philanthropist Petter Olsen. After a recent bankruptcy declaration, it is now Kristian Siem's company Juno Holding, that is taking over Ramme Gaard.

Developed as a working farm on organic principles from its inception, the Baroque garden, Havlystparkenn, which is open to the public features sculptures, ponds, fountains, and cascades.

Olsen also facilitates and sponsors cultural projects around the estate grounds. The open-air amphitheatre is used as a public performance area, hosting events such as the annual Rock Festival, which has featured performances by CC Cowboys, Deadaheads, and Neil Young.

Since Olsen became a patron sponsor of the British Shakespeare Company in 2006, the company has performed in the amphitheatre each year since:

- 2006: A Midsummer Night's Dream and Romeo and Juliet
- 2007: Henry VI
- 2009: Much Ado About Nothing with Kåre Conradi as a guest
