= Hvitsten =

Coordinates: 59°36′N 10°39′E

Hvitsten, Norway

Hvitsten is a former town in Akershus county, Norway, located between Drøbak and Son.

It is the smallest town that has ever existed in Norway: In 1951 it had 76 inhabitants, and an area of just 0.07 km^{2}. Due its size it could not be established as a municipality of its own, and it had to be a part of the rural municipality of Vestby. Hvitsten lost its status as a town January 1, 1964. The place is probably most known for the TV-show «Neste Sommer», which was filmed in this Area.

== The name ==
The town was named after the old farm Hvitsten (Norse Hvítisteinn), since it was built on its ground. The first element is hvítr 'white', the last element is steinn m 'stone, rock'.

== Notable people ==
Edvard Munch bought the property Nedre Ramme in 1910 and created some well-known works there before it was taken over by the invading Germans during World War II.

Fred. Olsen & Co. are also connected to Hvitsten where they have the family place Lysedal. The Hvitsten chapel (built in 1903) was a gift from Fred Olsen's mother, Bolette Olsen. Today, son Petter Olsen's Ramme Gaard estate is located in the area.
