= Fred. Olsen & Co. =

Norwegian holding company

- Type: Private
- Industry: Holding company
- Founded: 1848
- Headquarters: Oslo, Norway
- Key people: Anette S. Olsen (CEO)
- Website: www.fredolsen.no

Fred. Olsen & Co. is a holding company based in Oslo, Norway. The company was founded as a shipping firm by Petter Olsen in 1848. Today the company manages the Olsen family's interests in a variety of sectors including logistics, energy and consumer goods. The company is now owned by Anette S. Olsen, the fifth generation of the family.

== History ==
The company was founded by Petter Olsen (1821–1899) in 1848 and, by his death, the company had 16 ships with offices in Hvitsten. Petter's son Thomas Fredrik "Fred" Olsen (1857–1933) or Fred. Olsen, whom the company is named after, took the company from a small business with a few boats into a powerful multinational shipping and shipbuilding business. He had a vision of providing high-quality service on a network of lines, at first domestically and, afterwards, internationally. To do this required steamships, of which the first was acquired in 1897. By 1914, the first motor ship was put in use on the South America line. In World War I, 23 of the company's 44 ships were sunk.

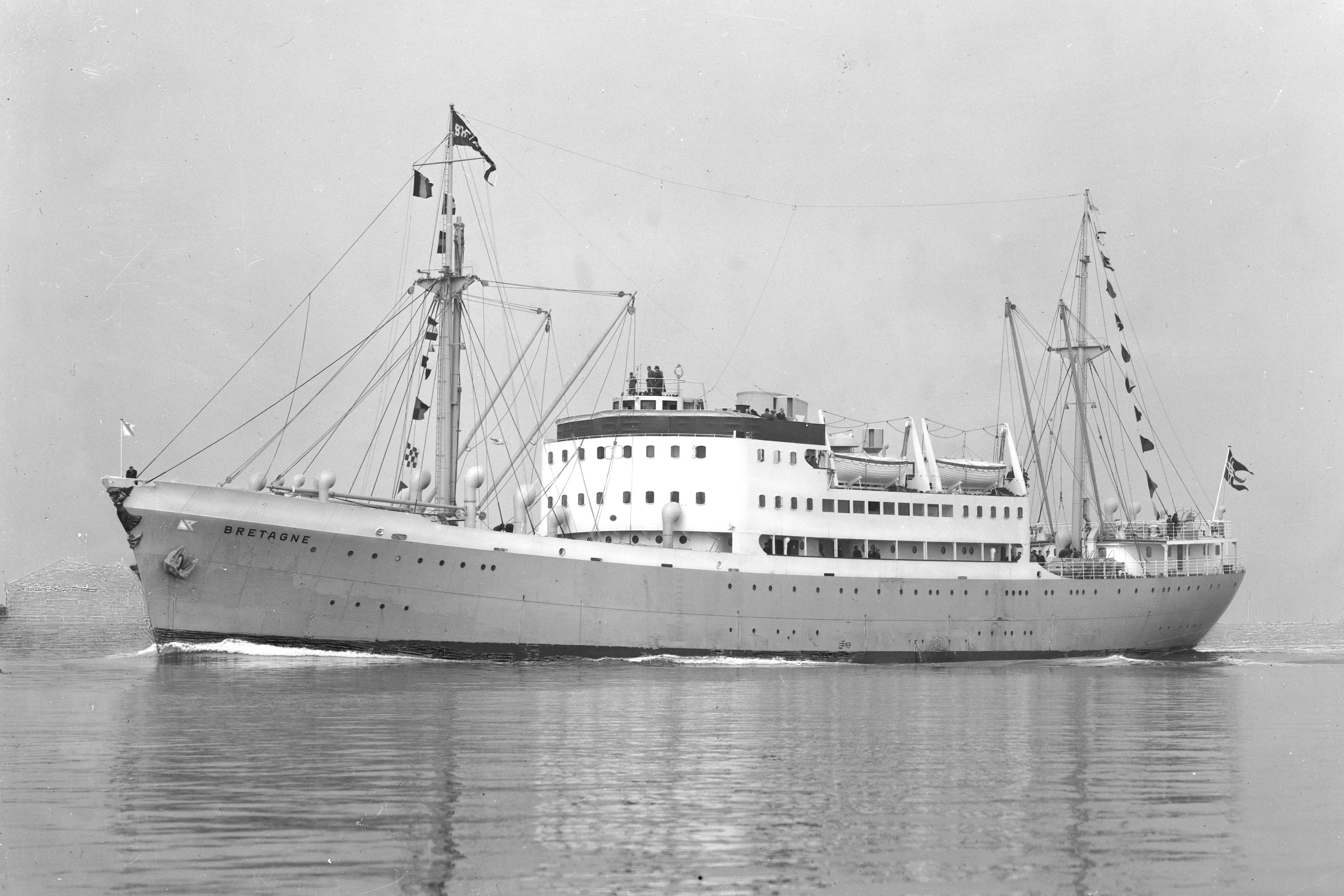
Bretagne (1937)

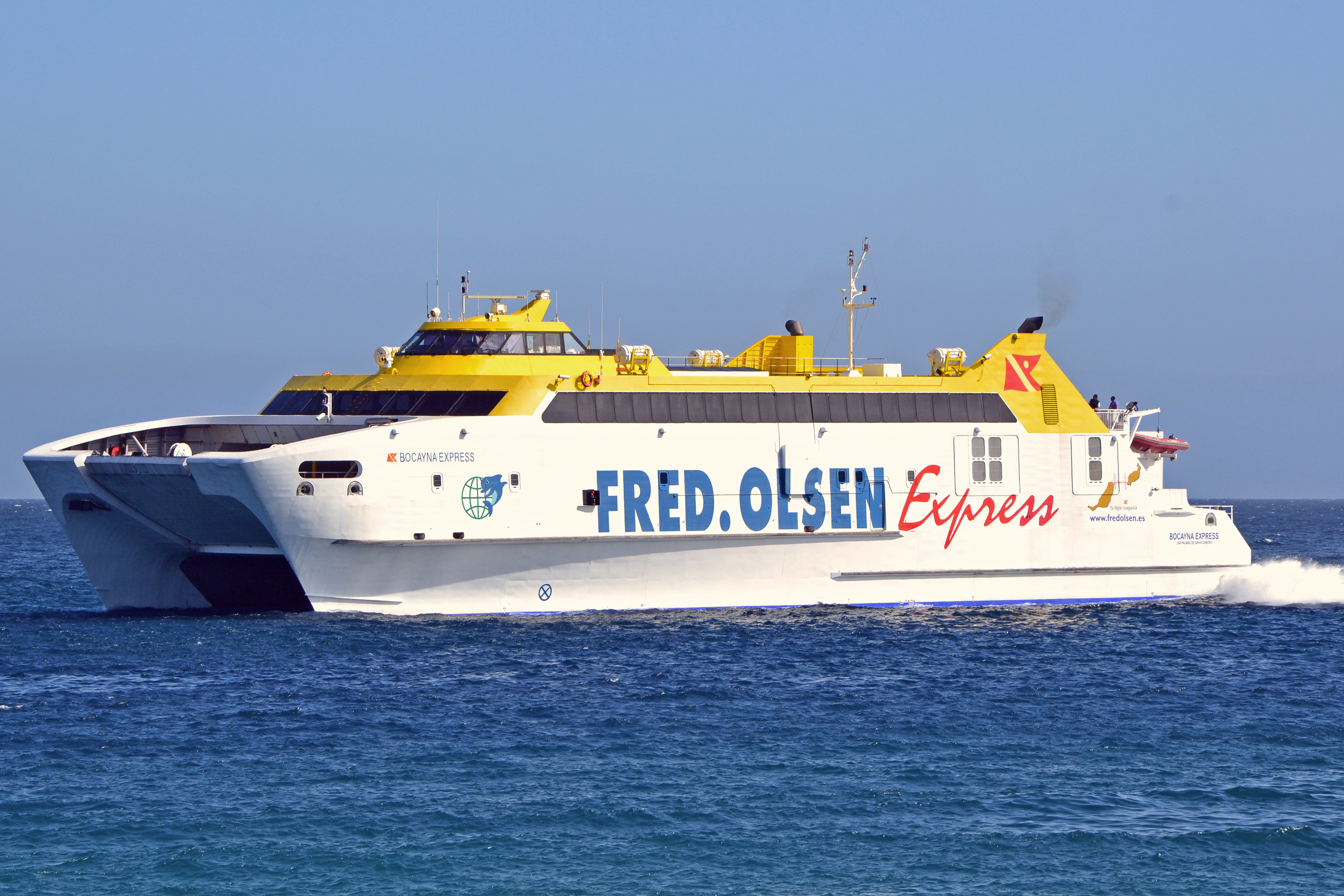
Bocayna Express (2003)

After the first Fred. Olsen's death, his sons Rudolf Olsen and Thomas Fredrik Olsen took over the company. During their leadership, the company expanded, even entering the aviation business with its own airline Fred. Olsen Flyselskap in addition to later partial ownerships of Det Norske Luftfartselskap, Scandinavian Airlines System, Widerøe, and Sterling Airlines. During World War II, the company's ships were in Allied service, though 28 were lost – about half the fleet. Rudolf died in 1951 and Thomas suffered ill health from 1955, eventually dying in 1969.

Thomas's son, also named Fred. Olsen (born 1 January 1929), is now in control of the company, after becoming director in 1955. In the early 1970s, Fred. Olsen entered the offshore business, with Dolphin drilling rigs and part of Saga Petroleum. The Saga shares were sold in 1991 while Dolphin is now part of Fred. Olsen Energy. Fred. Olsen also had a major share in the construction and engineering company Aker and currently owns Timex Corporation.

The company has also periodically entered the tanking business, operating a total of 40 ships since 1920. In 1973, it sold its tanking interests but reentered the industry again in 1986, creating the publicly listed company First Olsen Tankers in 1993 that was repurchased in 1999. Fred. Olsen Renewables has been involved in wind power since 1997 with wind farms in Norway, Sweden, Ireland and the United Kingdom. In 1980, it was involved in Nimslo, a company making 3D cameras, which later went bankrupt.

Fred. Olsen is today owned by Anette S. Olsen, the fifth generation of the family and daughter of Fred. Olsen. She took over ownership of Fred. Olsen & Co. in 1995 and has since been CEO, though Fred. Olsen has remained Chairman.

At the end of 2008, Fred. Olsen sold its part of Comarit and is no longer a stockholder of the Moroccan passenger carrier.

In 2022, Fred. Olsen son Thomas Frederick Olsen Jr. left the company after 35 years following his departure as head of Fred. Olsen Cruise Lines. As of 2026, Anette S. Olsen remains the only child of Fred. Olsen to serve on the board of directors of Fred. Olsen & Co.

== Companies in the Fred. Olsen Group ==
- Bonheur
- First Olsen Tankers
- Fred. Olsen Cruise Lines
- Fred. Olsen Express
- Fred. Olsen Production
- DN Media Group (minority ownership)
- Timex (minority ownership)
