= Bonheur (company) =

Norwegian holding company

Bonheur ASA
- Type: Allmennaksjeselskap
- Traded as: OSE: BON
- Industry: Holding company
- Founded: 1897
- Headquarters: Oslo, Norway
- Key people: Anette S. Olsen (CEO)
- Revenue: ▲NOK 1.3 million (2005)
- Operating income: NOK -35.4 million (2005)
- Net income: NOK 886.7 million (2005)
- Parent: Fred. Olsen & Co.
- Website: www.bonheur.no

Bonheur ASA is a publicly traded Norwegian holding company headquartered in Oslo. The company is listed on Oslo Stock Exchange and has interests in the energy, real estate, shipping and media sectors, and announced in October 2024 3-month profits of NOK 350m on sales of NOK 3.6bn, with the largest divisions being Renewable energy NOK 529m, Wind Service NOK 1,752m and Cruise NOK 1,016m

Bonheur is controlled by Fred. Olsen & Co., the private investment vehicle of Norwegian billionaire Anette S. Olsen. In May 2016 Bonheur merged with another Olsen family associated holding company Ganger Rolf ASA, giving Fred. Olsen & Co. a 49.53% ownership stake in the consolidated company.

== Investments ==
Company	Sector	Ownership %
Fred. Olsen Cruise Lines	Cruise	100%
Fred. Olsen Ocean	Shipping/Offshore wind	100%
Fred. Olsen Renewables	Renewable energy	100%
Fred. Olsen Windcarrier	Shipping/Offshore wind	100%
Fred. Olsens gate 2	Real estate	100%
Koksa Eiendom	Real estate	12.6%
DN Media Group	Media	54%
Stavenes Byggeselskap	Real estate	100%
