= Frøis Frøisland =

Norwegian newspaper correspondent and editor

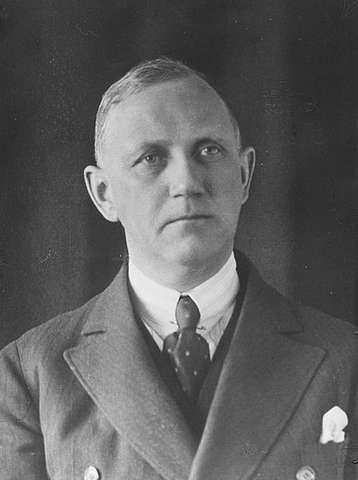
Frøis Frøisland

Nils Frøis Frøisland (4 February 1883 – 29 January 1930) was a Norwegian newspaper correspondent and editor.

He was born in Raufoss as a son of farmer and forest owner Nils Frøisland (1851–1932) and his wife Berthe Enger (1858–1924). He finished his secondary education in Hamar in 1900, and then attended the Norwegian Military Academy for one year. He then enrolled at the Royal Frederick University and graduated with the cand.jur. degree in 1907.

He contributed to the newspaper Fri Presse until it went defunct in 1908. He was hired by Amandus Schibsted as a journalist in Aftenposten. He studied in France for some time, returning in 1911, but he was sent back as a correspondent in December 1913. He was especially active during the First World War, becoming a prolific war correspondent. He held two nationwide lecture tours on the war in 1915 and 1919, and issued the books Fra Paris og Frankriges front under krigen (1916) and Fortellinger fra fronten (1928). In 1919 he succeeded Ola Christofersen as co-editor-in-chief of Aftenposten. He became sole editor in 1925 when Thorstein Diesen died. Frøisland became known for expanding the journalistic efforts of the newspaper, and starting the weekly A-magasinet.

In the 1927 Norwegian parliamentary election he was fielded as the second ballot candidate for the party National Legion, behind Karl Meyer and ahead of Thorvald Aadahl and Jens Bratlie. In a press release, the National Legion (led by Meyer) stated that it had cherrypicked "strong" personalities to combat the hardships in Norwegian politics. Frøisland denounced the ballot in an Aftenposten piece, stating that himself, Aadahl and Bratlie were unwilling and unaware of the nomination. He stated that a vote for the National Legion would be a wasted vote in the ongoing struggle against the "communists". However, according to Norwegian election law the people who were listed on the ballot had no legal grounds to avoid being nominated. The National Legion did not win any seats.

In May 1919, Frøisland married the pianist Astrid Helene Fagstad (1885–1945). Frøisland died in January 1930 in Oslo.

Media offices
Preceded by Thorstein Diesen; Ola Christofersen	Chief editor of Aftenposten; 1919–1930 (joint with Thorstein Diesen until 1925)	Succeeded by Johs. Nesse
