= Ola Christofersen =

Norwegian newspaper editor

Ola Christian Christofersen (23 September 1866 – 24 September 1922) was a Norwegian newspaper editor.

He was born in Sørum as a son of leather trader Martin Christofersen (1843–1925) and Caroline Mathea Johnsen (1833–1890). In 1897 he married wholesaler's daughter Olga Jensine Brodtkorb (1878–1920). His sister married roads director Andreas Baalsrud, making Christofersen as uncle of Terje Baalsrud and Jan Baalsrud.

Christofersen finished his secondary education in 1886 and took the University's admission test in 1887. He then enrolled in the Norwegian Military Academy, reaching the ranks of Premier Lieutenant in 1892 and Captain 1901. While studying at the Military Academy and later law (without graduating), he edited the Norwegian edition of Illustreret Konversationsleksikon and worked in Retsbladet.

He was hired as a journalist in Ørebladet in 1891, and became chief editor in 1892. He also became the private secretary of Fridtjof Nansen in the same year, and as such Nansen's secretary during the 1893–1896 Fram expedition. From 1894 to 1897 he also worked in Morgenbladet. He then became a journalist in Aftenposten, being promoted to subeditor in 1899 and financial director in 1906. He was a close aide to chief editor Amandus Schibsted, and upon Schibsted's death in 1913 he was succeeded by Christofersen and Thorstein Diesen. Christofersen almost never wrote in the paper, but handled practical affairs. He was more of a pecuniary strategist than the politically inclined Diesen, leading to professional and personal disagreements during the First World War. Christofersen withdrew in 1919.

Christofersen was a co-founder of Kristiania Journalist Club, which he chaired from 1895 to 1899 and 1904 to 1906. For his own partisan press he served as vice chairman of the Conservative Press Association from 1903 to 1909. He was later a board member of the nationwide Norwegian Press Association. He died in September 1922 in Kristiania.

Media offices
Preceded by	Chief editor of Ørebladet; 1892–1894	Succeeded by
Preceded by Amandus Schibsted	Chief editor of Aftenposten; 1913–1919 (joint with Thorstein Diesen)	Succeeded by Thorstein Diesen; Frøis Frøisland
