= Herbjørn Skogstad =

Norwegian illustrator and editorial cartoonist

- Born: 18 January 1946 (age 80); Nordre Land, Norway
- Other names: Herb
- Occupation: Illustrator

Herbjørn Skogstad, pen name Herb (born 18 January 1946) is a Norwegian illustrator and editorial cartoonist.

== Career ==
Born in Nordsinni in Nordre Land Municipality on 18 January 1946, a self-trained artist, Skogstad worked as illustrator and cartoonist for the newspaper Oppland Arbeiderblad from 1972, and for the media company Amedia. He has illustrated several books, and participated in exhibitions.

== Selected works ==
- Jakobsen, Thorstein (1979). Bedre liv med autogen trening. illustrated by Herbjørn Skogstad. Oslo: Breyer. ISBN 9788209017432. OCLC 463299440.
- Larsen, Reidar T (1980). Styrt fra Moskva? : erindringer 1960-1980. caricatures by Herbjørn Skogstad, Pedro, Finn Graff, Ellen Auensen. Oslo: Cappelen. ISBN 9788202047450. OCLC 7554946.
- Herb-92 : Utvalg av tegninger fra Oppland Arbeiderblad. Norway: Oppland Trykk. 1992. ISBN 9788290838138. OCLC 795328037.
- Sørebø, Herbjørn (1986). Viser for vêr og vind. illustrated by HERB. Oslo: Tiden. ISBN 9788210028618. OCLC 1028262898.
- Hirsti, Reidar, ed. (1989). Gro - midt i livet : en essaysamling. illustrations: Herbjørn Skogstad. Oslo: Tiden. ISBN 9788210032172. OCLC 493282684.
- Møller, Arvid (1994). Nisselue og fem par bukser. illustrated by Herb. Vinterbro: Atheneum. ISBN 9788273341945. OCLC 1028244930.
- Tajet, Magnus (2010). Til Tyskland for freden – rapport fra soldat nummer 23091. Illustrated by Herbjørn Skogstad (Herb). Gjøvik: Alfa Forlag. ISBN 9788292253335. OCLC 846483362.
