= Benneche =

Benneche is a surname. Notable people with the surname include:

- Gerd Benneche (1913–2003), Norwegian jurist, journalist, non-fiction writer and politician
- Olaf Benneche (1883–1931), Norwegian novelist, children's writer and playwright
- Sissel Benneche Osvold (born 1945), Norwegian journalist
