= Thorvald Aadahl =

Norwegian newspaper editor, novelist and playwright (1882–1962)

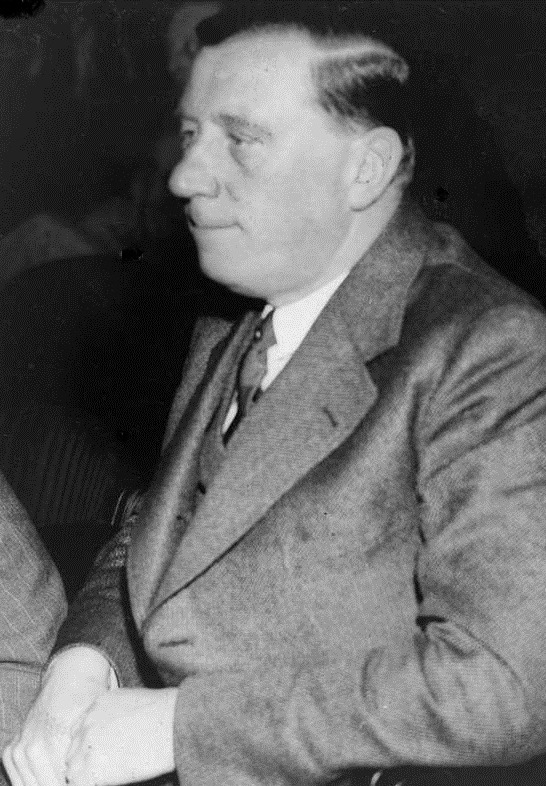
- Aadahl, c. 1935
- Born: 23 July 1882; Rødenes, Norway
- Died: 26 March 1962 (aged 79)
- Occupations: Newspaper editor, novelist, playwright

Thorvald Aadahl (23 July 1882 – 26 March 1962) was a Norwegian newspaper editor, novelist, and playwright.

== Biography ==
Born on 23 July 1882, in Rødenes, Aadahl was chief editor of Nationen newspaper from 1913 to 1942 and chaired the Norwegian Press Association from 1931 to 1934.

In the Norwegian parliamentary election of 1927, Aadahl was the third candidate on the list presented by the short-lived far-right National Legion, behind Karl Meyer (the party's leader) and Frøis Frøisland, and ahead of Jens Bratlie. In a press release, the National Legion stated that it had deliberately chosen "strong" personalities able to withstand the rigours of Norwegian politics.

Frøisland denounced the list in a piece Aadahl wrote in Aftenposten, stating that neither he, Aadahl, nor Bratlie were willing candidates; they had not even been aware of their nomination. He declared that a vote for the National Legion would be a wasted vote in the ongoing struggle against "the communists". Norwegian electoral law provided no legal grounds, however, for persons listed in the ballot to refuse their nomination. In the event, the National Legion received only 1,210 votes nationwide and won no seats in parliament. He died on 26 March 1962, aged 79.

Media offices
Preceded by Knut Domaas	Chairman of the Norwegian Press Association; 1931–1934	Succeeded by Knut Domaas
