= Baalsrud =

Baalsrud is a Norwegian surname. Notable people with the surname include:

- Andreas Baalsrud (1872–1961), Norwegian civil engineer
- Jan Baalsrud (1917–1988), Norwegian Army commando
- Terje Baalsrud (1914–2003), Norwegian newspaper editor
