= Osvold =

Osvold is a surname. Notable people with the surname include:

- Joachim Osvold (born 1994), Norwegian footballer, son of Kjetil
- Kjetil Osvold (born 1961), Norwegian footballer
- Sissel Benneche Osvold (born 1945), Norwegian journalist
- Totto Osvold (1941–2023), Norwegian radio entertainer
