= Jens Bratlie =

Norwegian statesman, attorney and military officer (1856–1939)

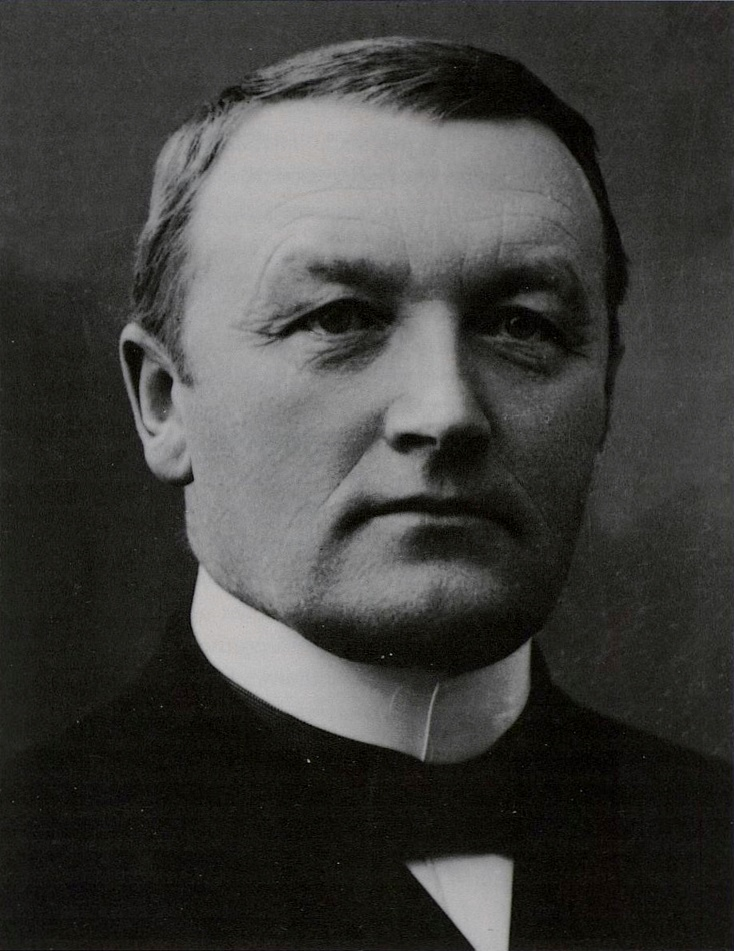
- Jens Bratlie

Prime Minister of Norway
- In office 20 February 1912 – 31 January 1913
- Monarch: Haakon VII
- Preceded by: Wollert Konow
- Succeeded by: Gunnar Knudsen

President of the Storting
- In office 1 January 1910 – 20 February 1912; Served with Magnus Halvorsen and Wollert Konow
- Monarch: Haakon VII
- Prime Minister: Gunnar Knudsen; Wollert Konow
- Preceded by: Edvard A. Liljedahl; Gunnar Knudsen; Carl Berner
- Succeeded by: Jørgen Løvland; Søren Tobias Årstad; Gunnar Knudsen

Minister of Defence
- In office 20 February 1912 – 31 January 1913
- Prime Minister: Himself
- Preceded by: Karl Bull
- Succeeded by: Hans Vilhelm Keilhau

Minister of Auditing
- In office 20 February 1912 – 31 January 1913
- Prime Minister: Himself
- Preceded by: Wollert Konow
- Succeeded by: Gunnar Knudsen

Leader of the Conservative Party
- In office 1911–1919
- Preceded by: Fredrik Stang
- Succeeded by: Otto B. Halvorsen

Member of the Norwegian Parliament
- In office 1 January 1901 – 31 December 1912
- Constituency: Uranienborg
- In office 1 January 1916 – 31 December 1918
- Constituency: Uranienborg

Personal details
- Born: Jens Kristian Meninich Bratlie; 17 January 1856 Nordre Land, United Kingdoms of Sweden and Norway
- Died: 15 September 1939 (aged 83) Oslo, Norway
- Resting place: Vår Frelsers Gravlund
- Party: Conservative
- Other political affiliations: Fatherland League; National Legion
- Education: The Royal Frederick University
- Awards: Order of St. Olav; Order of Vasa; Order of the Dannebrog; Order of the Sword

Military service
- Allegiance: Norway
- Branch/service: Norwegian Army
- Years of service: 1873–1929
- Rank: Major General

Jens Kristian Meinich Bratlie (17 January 1856 – 15 September 1939) was a Norwegian attorney and military officer. He served as an elected official representing the Conservative Party. He was the prime minister of Norway from 1912 to 1913.

== Biography ==
Jens Bratlie was born in Nordre Land Municipality in Christians amt (county), Norway. Bratlie came from a family of leading businessmen and civil servant. He was the son of Erik Bratlie (1814-1890) and wife Bolette Sofie Meinich (1821-1870). Following the death of his mother, he was adopted by the industrialist Jørgen Meinich.

Bratlie graduated from the Military High School in 1880 and was trained as an army officer (eventually rising to the level of Major General). He also earned a law degree allowing him to work as a high-ranking civil servant (1886). He served several years as expedition secretary in the Department of Defense. He became Captain (1893), General Commission Commissioner (1898) and General Attorney for the Armenian Judiciary from 1906.

Bratlie held several offices such as leader of the Conservative Party (1910–11) and president of the Storting (1910–12). He was in the Storting representing Kristiania (now Oslo) 1900-12 and 1916–18. He served as Norwegian Minister of Defence and Minister of Auditing from 1912 to 1913.

In the 1927 Norwegian parliamentary election he was the fourth ballot candidate for the party National Legion, behind Karl Meyer, Frøis Frøisland and Thorvald Aadahl. In a press release, the National Legion (led by Meyer) stated that it had cherry picked "strong" personalities to combat the hardships in Norwegian politics. Frøisland denounced the ballot in an Aftenposten piece, stating that himself, Aadahl and Bratlie was unwilling and unaware of the nomination. He stated that a vote for the National Legion would be a wasted vote in the struggle against the "communists". However, according to Norwegian election law the people who were listed on the ballot had no legal grounds to avoid being nominated.

He served as chairman of the Conservative Party from 1911 to 1919. Following his death in 1939, his interment was at Vår Frelsers gravlund.

== See also ==
- Bratlie's Cabinet

Political offices
Preceded by Wollert Konow	Prime Minister of Norway; 1912–1913	Succeeded by Gunnar Knudsen
