= Narvesen Prize =

Norwegian journalism award

The Narvesen Prize was a Norwegian prize for those who excelled in journalism. It was established in 1954 by the company Narvesen, but the Norwegian Press Association was behind the selection of winners. It was discontinued in 1990.

== List of winners ==
- 1954 : Anders Buraas, Arbeiderbladet
- 1955 : Gösta Hammarlund, Dagbladet
- 1956 : Asbjørn Barlaup, Verdens Gang
- 1957 : Jorunn Johnsen, Aftenposten
- 1958 : Henry Imsland, Stavanger Aftenblad
- 1959 : Terje Baalsrud, Norges Handels- og Sjøfartstidende
- 1960 : P. Chr. Andersen and Henning Sinding-Larsen, Aftenposten
- 1961 : Jacob R. Kuhnle, Morgenavisen
- 1962 : Gidske Anderson, Arbeiderbladet and Odd Hagen, Oppland Arbeiderblad
- 1963 : Arne Hestenes, Dagbladet
- 1964 : Einar Eriksen, Bergens Tidende
- 1965 : Erik Bye, Norwegian Broadcasting Corporation
- 1966 : Arne H. Halvorsen, Stavanger Aftenblad
- 1967 : Richard Herrmann, Norwegian Broadcasting Corporation
- 1968 : Arve Solstad, Dagbladet and Per Egil Hegge, Aftenposten
- 1969 : Kai Otto Hansen, Bergens Arbeiderblad
- 1970 : Sverre Mitsem, Tønsbergs Blad
- 1971 : Asbjørn Larsen, Norwegian Broadcasting Corporation and Lars Sigurd Sunnanå, Aftenposten
- 1972 : Fædrelandsvennen
- 1973 : Ellen Auensen, Morgenbladet and Gunnar Filseth, Aftenposten
- 1974 : Gerd Benneche, Dagbladet
- 1975 : Rolf W. Thanem and Geir Tønset, Adresseavisen
- 1976 : Berit Eriksen
- 1977 : Terje Gammelsrud
- 1978 : Hans Melien, Adresseavisen
- 1979 : Rolf M. Aagaard, Aftenposten
- 1980 : Arne Skouen, Dagbladet
- 1981 : Erling Borgen, Norwegian Broadcasting Corporation and John Olav Egeland, Dagbladet
- 1982 : Vårt Land
- 1983 : Kjell Gjerseth
- 1984 : Knut Fjeld, Østlendingen
- 1985 : Kjell Øvre-Helland, Bergens Tidende
- 1986 : Veslemøy Kjendsli, NRK P2
- 1987 : Per A. Christiansen, Aftenposten
- 1988 : Dagmar Loe, Norwegian Broadcasting Corporation
- 1989 : Tor-Erik Røberg-Larsen and Per Ellingsen, Arbeiderbladet
- 1990 : Hans-Wilhelm Steinfeld, Norwegian Broadcasting Corporation
