= Jacob R. Kuhnle =

Norwegian newspaper editor

Jacob Reimers Kuhnle (29 July 1907 – 28 March 1996) was a Norwegian newspaper editor.

He finished secondary school in 1926, and was hired as a sports journalist in Bergens Aftenblad in 1928. From 1938 to 1942 he was subeditor. From 1945 to 1962 he was a subeditor in Morgenavisen, from 1962 to 1966 he was editor-in-chief jointly with Erling Lauhn and from 1966 to 1974 he was the sole editor-in-chief of Morgenavisen. He also held causeries in the Norwegian Broadcasting Corporation radio. He was awarded the Narvesen Prize in 1961.

He was a board member of the Norwegian Press Association from 1946 to 1955, and also of Den Nationale Scene and the Bergen International Festival. He died in March 1996. He was the father of political scientist Stein Kuhnle.

Awards
Preceded by P. Chr. Andersen and Henning Sinding-Larsen	Recipient of the Narvesen Prize; 1961	Succeeded by Odd Hagen and Gidske Anderson
