= Erik Loe (editor) =

Norwegian journalist (1920–2013)

Erik Loe (31 October 1920 – 16 November 2013) was a Norwegian journalist.

He was born in Ås, a son of a professor at the Norwegian College of Agriculture. He enrolled in philology studies at the University of Oslo. During the occupation of Norway by Nazi Germany, following the 1943 University of Oslo fire, he was arrested on 30 November 1943 with hundreds of other students. He was sent to a correctional camp in Stavern, then dispatched to Buchenwald concentration camp on 7 January 1944. He was also incarcerated in Sennheim concentration camp, being rescued when the camps were liberated.

After the war, he finally graduated with the cand.philol. degree in 1948. He worked for one year in the Ministry of Foreign Affairs, and was then hired as a foreign affairs journalist in Arbeiderbladet. He was promoted to foreign affairs editor in 1973 and served as such until his retirement.

He lived in Oslo and was married to Dagmar Loe, née Scheflo. He was thus son-in-law of Olav Scheflo and brother-in-law of Inge Scheflo.
