= Pryser =

Pryser is a Norwegian surname. Notable people with the surname include:

- Thoralf Pryser (1885–1970), Norwegian journalist and newspaper editor
- Tore Pryser (born 1945), Norwegian historian
