= Sønsteby =

Sønsteby is a Norwegian surname. Notable people with the surname include:

- Gunnar Sønsteby (1918–2012), Norwegian World War II resistance fighter
- Sven Sønsteby (1933–2014), Norwegian illustrator
