= Asbjørn Barlaup =

Norwegian journalist (1902–1989)

Asbjørn Barlaup (31 January 1902 – 4 February 1989) was a Norwegian journalist.

He was born in Trondheim. He worked in Adresseavisen from 1919, and later became subeditor of Morgenavisen. He was hired in Tidens Tegn in 1930, but resigned in protest in 1940 because of the German occupation of Norway and the Nazi usurpation of the newspaper. He instead joined the Norwegian resistance movement, fled in 1941 when he was in danger of being discovered, and worked until 1945 for the Norwegian High Command in exile. Based in London, he took part in Operation Archery.

After 1945 he worked for the newspaper Verdens Gang. Already in the first year he hired Salo Grenning as an illustrator. He was awarded the Narvesen Prize in 1956. He was later information director in Elkem. He was an honorary member of the Norwegian Polytechnic Society. He died in 1989.

Awards
Preceded by Gösta Hammarlund	Recipient of the Narvesen Prize; 1956	Succeeded by Jorunn Johnsen
