= Dagmar Loe =

Norwegian journalist (1923–2024)

- Born: Dagmar Scheflo; 19 January 1923; Norway
- Died: March 2024 (aged 101)
- Occupation: Journalist
- Political party: Labour
- Spouse: Erik Loe
- Father: Olav Scheflo
- Relatives: Per Monsen (brother-in-law)
- Awards: Narvesen Prize (1988); Fritt Ord Honorary Award (1993)

Dagmar Loe (19 January 1923 – March 2024) was a Norwegian journalist. Assigned to NRK for three decades, she was a pioneer in bringing up controversial issues such as abortion, incest, rape, dementia, imprisonment of juveniles, and trading of weapons.

Loe was awarded the Narvesen Prize in 1988, and the Fritt Ord Honorary Award in 1993.

== Early life ==
Born as Dagmar Scheflo on 19 January 1923, she was a daughter of journalist and politician Olav Scheflo. Scheflo was a central figure in the class struggle and the cultural conflicts in the 1920s and 1930s. Belonging to the radical side of the Labour Party, he had been chief editor of the party's principal newspaper, Socialdemokraten, from 1918 to 1921, was elected representative to the Storting from 1921, and was also parliamentary leader of the party. Growing up in this environment was part of forming her childhood, while in her youth she experienced the outbreak of the Second World War, the German occupation, and civil resistance from the population. In the chaotic period following the German invasion, she and her family abandoned Oslo, heading northwards, eventually crossing the Swedish border east of Mo i Rana in May 1940. The 17-year-old Dagmar accompanied Nobel Prize laureate Sigrid Undset, famous for her anti-Nazi speeches, during the last part of the flight.

She was also incarcerated at the Grini concentration camp for a short period in February 1945; Norsk fangeleksikon cites Flykningehjelp (refugee assistance) as cause of arrest.

== Career ==
She finished her secondary education in 1942. From 1945, she worked as office assistant for the news agency Arbeidernes Pressebyrå in Oslo, eventually also with journalistic work. In 1951, she was hired as journalist for the magazine Aktuell. Following a period as housewife with small children, she worked as freelance journalist for the magazine Forbrukerrapporten from 1961, and eventually fulltime. In the 1960s, she wrote the books Landslaget for husstell-lærere 50 år. 1914–1964, and Kvinnens plass i framtidssamfunnet.

In 1968, she was appointed television journalist for NRK, in the daily news magazine Dagsrevyen. She was assigned to NRK for three decades, and was a pioneer in bringing up taboo issues such as abortion, incest, and rape, as well as controversial issues like dementia, imprisonment of juveniles and trading of weapons.

In 1988, Loe received the Narvesen Prize. The jury emphasized her thorough work in contrast to tendencies of the time to be more quick and superficious. She received the Fritt Ord Honorary Award in 1993, for her investigative journalism and unselfish work methods.

A biography of Loe, written by Sidsel Meyer, was published in 2011.

== Personal life and death ==
She was married twice, first to journalist Gunnar Hærnes, second to journalist Erik Loe. Her elder sister Beret was married to media executive Per Monsen from 1941 to 1950.

Loe turned 100 on 19 January 2023. She died in March 2024, at the age of 101.

Awards
| Preceded by Per A. Christiansen | Recipient of the Narvesen Prize; 1988 | Succeeded by Tor-Erik Røberg-Larsen; Per Ellingsen |
