= Erik Diesen =

Norwegian revue writer (1922–1999)

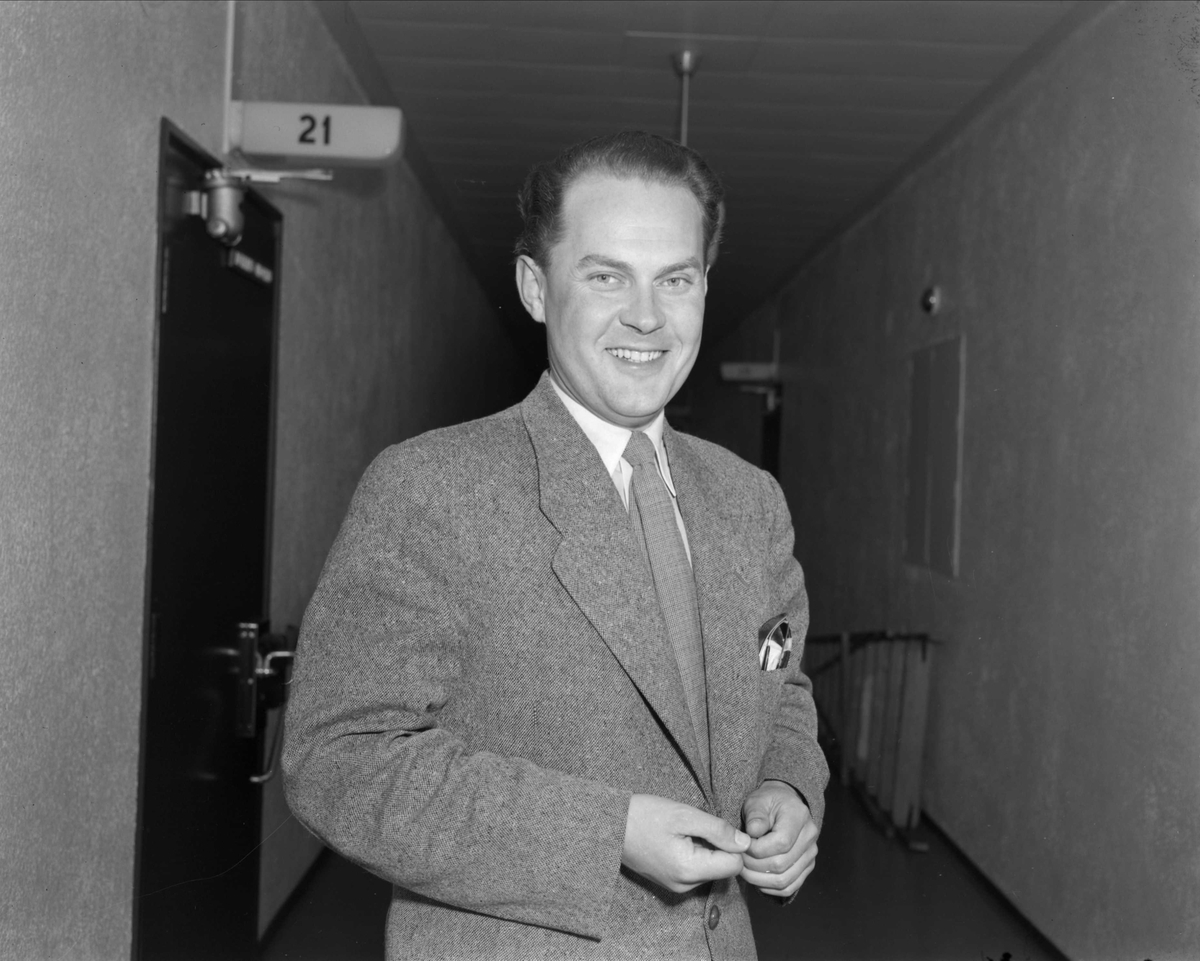
- Born: 8 October 1922; Kristiania, Norway
- Died: 13 September 1999 (aged 76); Oslo
- Occupation(s): Revue writer Radio and television personality
- Employer: NRK
- Awards: Amanda Honorary Award (1989); Leonard Statuette (1995)

Erik Tangevald Diesen (8 October 1922 – 13 September 1999) was a Norwegian revue writer and radio and television personality.

== Personal life ==
Born in Kristiania on 8 October 1922, Diesen was a son of Thorstein Diesen, Jr. (1894–1962) and Ragna Marie Tangevald (1891–1945), grandnephew of Thorstein Diesen and first cousin once removed of Einar Diesen. He was married twice. His second wife Anne Torjusson was assisting director of television in the Norwegian Broadcasting Corporation, and through her he was a son-in-law of Aslak Torjusson.

== Career ==
He was associated with the Norwegian Broadcasting Corporation for more than fifty years, and is regarded the founder of television entertainment in Norway.

He was awarded the Amanda Honorary Award in 1989, and the Leonard Statuette in 1995. In 1988 he was awarded the Se og Hør readers' TV personality of the year award.

Awards
Preceded by Eli Rygg	Se og Hør's TV Personality of the Year; 1988	Succeeded by Nils Gunnar Lie
