= Ellen Auensen =

Norwegian illustrator

Ellen Auensen (born 28 June 1944) is a Norwegian illustrator.

She was born in Oslo. She finished her secondary education at Oslo Cathedral School in 1963, and graduated from the Norwegian National Academy of Craft and Art Industry in 1968. In the same year she was hired as an illustrator and political cartoonist in the newspaper Morgenbladet. She was awarded the Narvesen Prize in 1973. At the time, she was the only female illustrator to win this award; two men Gösta Hammarlund and Henry Imsland won it in the 1950s. Some of her political cartoons were released as books with writings by Knut Bøckman: Ellen 72: Se Norges blomsterdal (1972), Ellen 73: Mot den evige sne (1973) and Ellen 75: I hine hårde dage (1975).

From 1978 to 1990 she lived in Sweden and worked for Sveriges Radio and Swedish publishing houses. After returning to Norway she mainly illustrated book covers after 1990.

Awards
Preceded by Fædrelandsvennen	Recipient of the Narvesen Prize; 1973 (together with Gunnar Filseth)	Succeeded by Gerd Benneche
