= A-magasinet =

Norwegian newspaper supplement

A-magasinet is a supplement to the Norwegian newspaper Aftenposten that is published every Friday. The supplement is published in a format of 210 by 278 millimeters (8.3 by 10.9 in), and it is therefore smaller than the daily newspaper, which is published in tabloid format. The supplement is printed at the press Hjemmet Mortensen Trykkeri and its number of pages has ranged from 68 to 84. Until 2001, the supplement was printed by the press Aktietrykkeriet in Fetsund.

== History ==
A-magasinet was issued during three periods: from 1926 to 1943, from 1963 to 1993, and from 2005 onward.

The first issue was published on New Year's eve in 1926 at the initiative of editor Frøis Frøisland. The name of the publication was selected in a contest among the readers of Aftenposten. Other suggestions for naming the publication included Lørdagshygga ('Saturday cosiness'), Ding Dong, Sofadyret ('couch creature'), and Tilhænger'n ('trailer', after Harald Madsen of the popular comic pair Ole & Axel, dubbed Tilhengeren in Norwegian). The publication was discontinued in 1943 because of a paper shortage during the Second World War.

The publication was re-launched in 1963 with a "women's profile" focusing on family life, home, and fashion. By the following year, this editorial profile had been abandoned, and A-magasinet was oriented toward entertaining journalism. The first color photos appeared in it in 1966, and since then photojournalism has been an important part of the supplement. In 1984, Per Egil Hegge became the editor and refreshed the publication's style. A consistent feature was crime stories and writing competitions with humorous illustrations by Sven Sønsteby. During this period, the nature photographer Sverre M. Fjelstad contributed the feature "Naturen rundt oss" (The Natural World around Us) for 20 years. A-magasinet was discontinued in 1993, after many of the advertisers switched to Schibsted's newly launched TV 2.

The third incarnation of A-magasinet began when it was relaunched on October 21, 2005. Kjersti Løken Stavrum, the former editor-in-chief for the weekly magazine Kvinner og Klær, became the editor. In 2013, Lillian Vambheim succeeded Stavrum.
