= Rolf M. Aagaard =

Norwegian photographer

- Born: Rolf Magdal Aagaard; 27 March 1945 (age 80); Risør, Norway
- Occupations: Photographer, writer

Rolf Magdal Aagaard (born 27 March 1945) is a Norwegian photographer.

Aagaard worked for one year for Tiden and seven years for Fædrelandsvennen before being hired by Aftenposten in 1970. He was awarded the Narvesen Prize in 1979. He has also held exhibitions, and he has written books including Snow, Shadows of the Winds.

Awards
Preceded by Hans Melien	Recipient of the Narvesen Prize; 1979	Succeeded by Arne Skouen
