= Elise Sem =

Norwegian barrister, women's activist and sports official

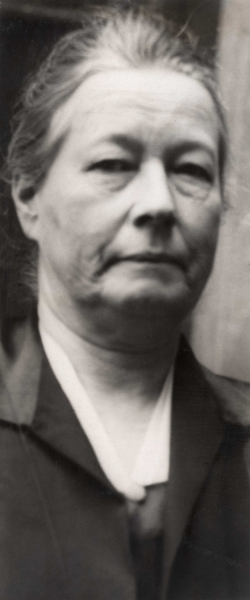
Elise Sem, c. 1928

Elise Sem (26 November 1870 – 9 January 1950) was a Norwegian barrister, women's activist and sports official. She was the first female attorney in Europe and the first female barrister in Norway.

== Early life and education ==
She was a daughter of district stipendiary magistrate Gabriel Egidius Johan Henrik Sem (1824–1900) and Emma Nathalie Christensen (1843–1933). She was a grand niece of Niels Arntzen Sem. She was born in Christiania, but grew up in Mandal.

At the age of 24 she moved back to Kristiania to take secondary education. She finished this at Gjertsen School in 1896 and enrolled at the Royal Frederick University in 1897. She graduated with the cand.jur. degree in 1901.

== Career ==
She could not yet work as an attorney, as this was not possible for women. She was however hired as a junior solicitor by attorney Thorstein Diesen in 1902, and from 1903 to 1904 she served as a deputy judge in Kristiania Probate Court. Elise Sem and other candidatae juris campaigned for the right for women to hold law offices. A law proposal was sent to the Parliament of Norway from the Norwegian Bar Association, and when parts of it passed, it was largely because Elise Sem was seen as qualified for being an attorney. The new law was thus dubbed "Lex Elisiana". It came into effect on 22 March 1904, and on the same day Sem opened her own attorney's office in Karl Johans gate 10. She thereby became the first female attorney in Europe.

In 1905 she was the first female prosecutor in Norway, in 1911 she was the first woman to appear in a Supreme Court. This was one of her three mandatory trials to become a barrister, with access to working with Supreme Court cases. When she was finally authorized as a barrister on 27 July 1912, she was the first of the kind in Norway. She was a defender in Kristiania Court of Appeal from 1913, and also vice chairman (from 1918) and chairman (from 1934) of the wage tribunal for industrial domestic labor in Kristiania and Aker. She was also a board member of corporations such as Franzefoss Bruk.

Sem was also a deputy board member of the Norwegian Association for Women's Rights and secretary of the anti-white slave trade organization Nasjonalforeningen til bekjæmpelse af den hvide slavehandel. In 1920 she was a co-founder and board member of the Norwegian Female Academics, a member body of the International Federation of University Women.

She was a co-founder of the gymnastics club Kvinnelige Studenters GF (now a part of Oslo-Studentenes IK) in 1896, and was a board member of the Norwegian Association of University Sport. She was also a driving force in the skiing and social club Kvinnelige Studenters SK, serving as the first chairman in 1912–1916 and in 1919.

From 1916 she resided in Villa Furulund at Holmenkollen together with her mother as well as two sisters. She died in January 1950 and was buried at Vår Frelsers gravlund.

== See also ==
- First women lawyers around the world
