= Johan Kristian Skougaard =

Norwegian military officer and politician

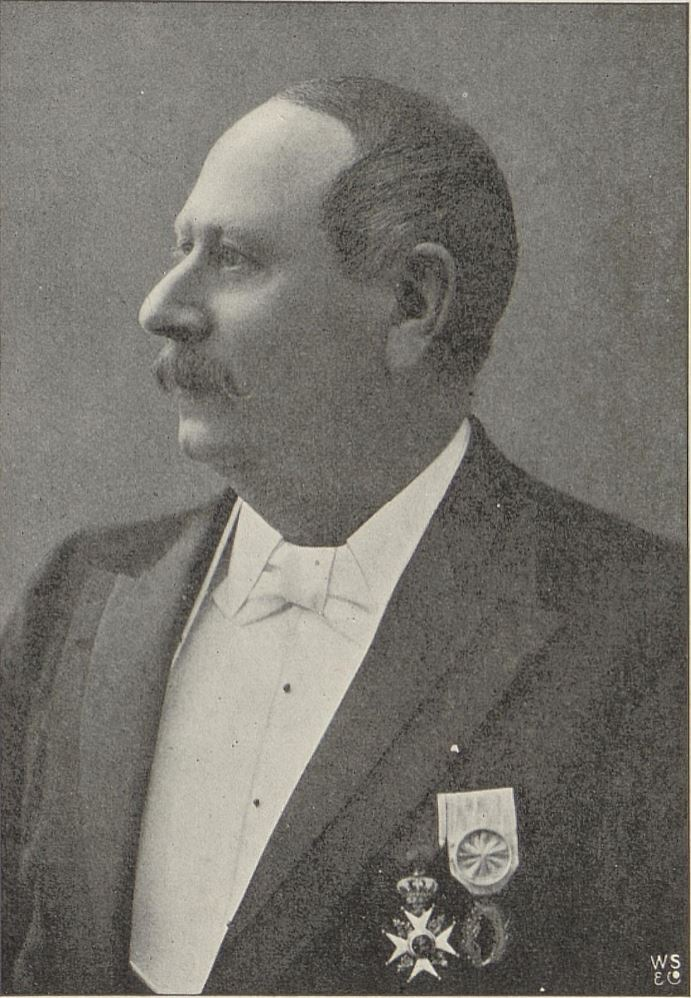
Johan Kristian Skougaard

Johan Kristian Skougaard (31 July 1847 – 25 September 1925) was a Norwegian military officer and politician.

He was born at Lista in Vanse Municipality, and originally took his education in the Norwegian military. He was hired as an engineer in the Norwegian Public Roads Administration in 1873, and left the military in 1887. He served as mayor of Oslo in 1905, and as director of the Norwegian Directorate of Public Roads from 1904 to 1918.

He was also a non-fiction writer, publishing the Det norske veivesens historie in two volumes, and a lexicographer, publishing a French-Norwegian dictionary in 1921. A Norwegian-French dictionary was published posthumously.

Political offices
Preceded by Jens Ludvig Andersen Aars	Mayors of Oslo; 1905	Succeeded by Fredrik Moltke Bugge
Government offices
Preceded by Hans Hagerup Krag	Director of the Norwegian Directorate of Public Roads; 1904–1918	Succeeded by Andreas Baalsrud
