= Arvid Møller =

Norwegian journalist and writer (1939–2020)

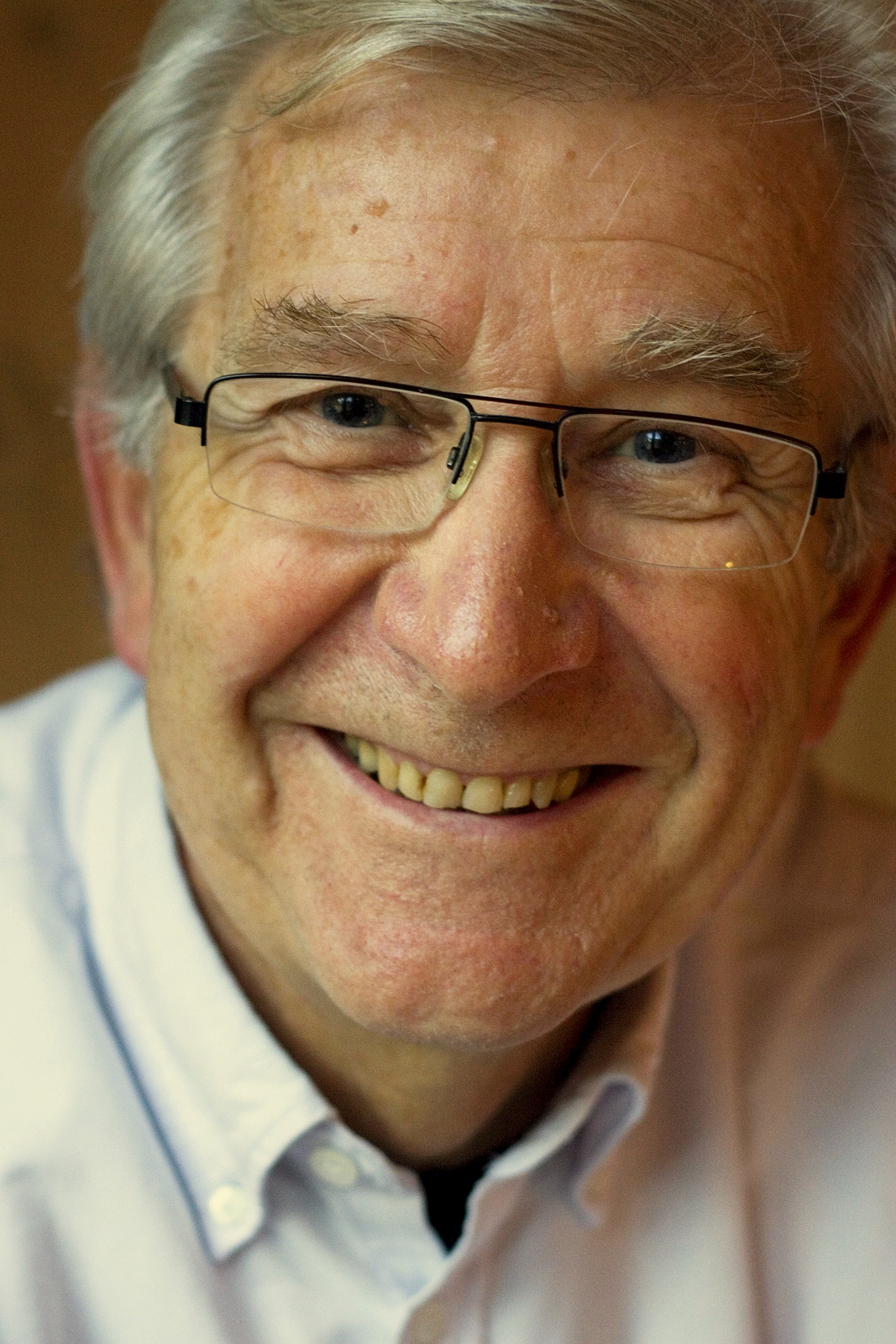
- Born: 14 October 1939; Strinda Municipality, Norway
- Died: 27 September 2020 (aged 80); Lillehammer Municipality, Norway
- Occupation(s): Journalist and non-fiction writer
- Awards: King's Medal of Merit (2005)

Arvid Møller (14 October 1939 – 26 September 2020) was a Norwegian journalist and non-fiction writer, born in Strinda Municipality. Having worked as journalist for various newspapers, he was eventually assigned with NRK for about forty years. In addition to these assignments, he wrote more than one hundred books, many of them biographies of well known and lesser known people.

== Career ==
Born in Strinda Municipality on 14 October 1939, Møller grew up in Voss Municipality.

From 1959 onwards Møller worked as journalist for the newspapers Gula Tidend, Fredrikstad Blad, Gudbrandsdølen, Lillehammer Tilskuer and Dagningen. From 1969 he was appointed as journalist at NRK's regional office in Lillehammer, where he worked for about forty years.

Møller wrote more than hundred books, including biographies of the artists Frans Widerberg, Kåre Tveter, Olav Mosebekk, Per Ung and Harald Kihle, skier Håkon Brusveen, missionary Annie Skau Berntsen, politician John Alvheim, Queen Maud, Princess Märtha, Norwegian-Canadian skiing pioneer Herman Smith-Johannsen, as well as biographies of "ordinary people" and local legends. He also wrote books on other subjects, including nature and art.

He was awarded Austmannaprisen in 1969. In 2000, he received a cultural prize for Gudbrandsdalen. In 2005, he was awarded the King's Medal of Merit in gold.

Møller died at Lillehammer on 26 or 27 September 2020.

== Selected works ==
- Barn på flukt. (Biography of Johan Åsgård). Oslo: Luther. 1982. ISBN 9788253141541. OCLC 1028246802.
- Novikfolket. Oslo: Aschehoug. 1982. ISBN 9788203107733. OCLC 941437642.
- Australiafarere – nordmenn som tok en annen vei. Oslo: Cappelen. 1986.
- Se Norges OL-dal! Lillehammer og Gudbrandsdalen. Oslo: Cappelen. 1989. ISBN 9788202117467. OCLC 1028258118.
- Sikkilsdalen – bufast folk, jegere og turister, Prinsehytta - i Kongens eie i 65 år, hestene slippes!. Oslo: Grøndahl. 1989. ISBN 9788250417014. OCLC 1028259903.
- Den ukjente krigen – til minne om norske soldater i Stillehavet. Oslo: Atheneum. 1990. ISBN 9788273341693. OCLC 1028260465.
- Galdhøpiggen. Oslo: Cappelen. 1994. ISBN 9788202141332. OCLC 1028342724.
- Nisselue og fem par bukser. illustrated by Herb. Vinterbro: Atheneum. 1994. ISBN 9788273341945. OCLC 1028244930.
- Oskar Sørreime. Lillehammer: Thorsrud. 1999. ISBN 9788278470473. OCLC 1028332751.
- Juvasshytta – et herberge oppunder Galdhøpiggen. Lillehammer: Thorsrud. 2000. ISBN 9788278470558. OCLC 1028317105.
- Beitostølen fra stølsgrend til turistmetropol. Lillehammer: Thorsrud. 2003. ISBN 9788278470978. OCLC 1028359966.
- Skåbu – ei fjellbygd i Jotunheimens forgård. Lillehammer: Thorsrud. 2003. ISBN 9788278470961. OCLC 1028386153.
- Ville, vakre Lofoten. illustrations: Dagfinn Bakke. Oslo: Lunde. 2004. ISBN 9788252047578. OCLC 1028303650.
- Først i sporet : på Madshus-ski gjennom 100 år. Oslo: Kagge. 2006. ISBN 9788248906148. OCLC 938814882.
