= Thorstein Diesen =

Norwegian newspaper editor and politician

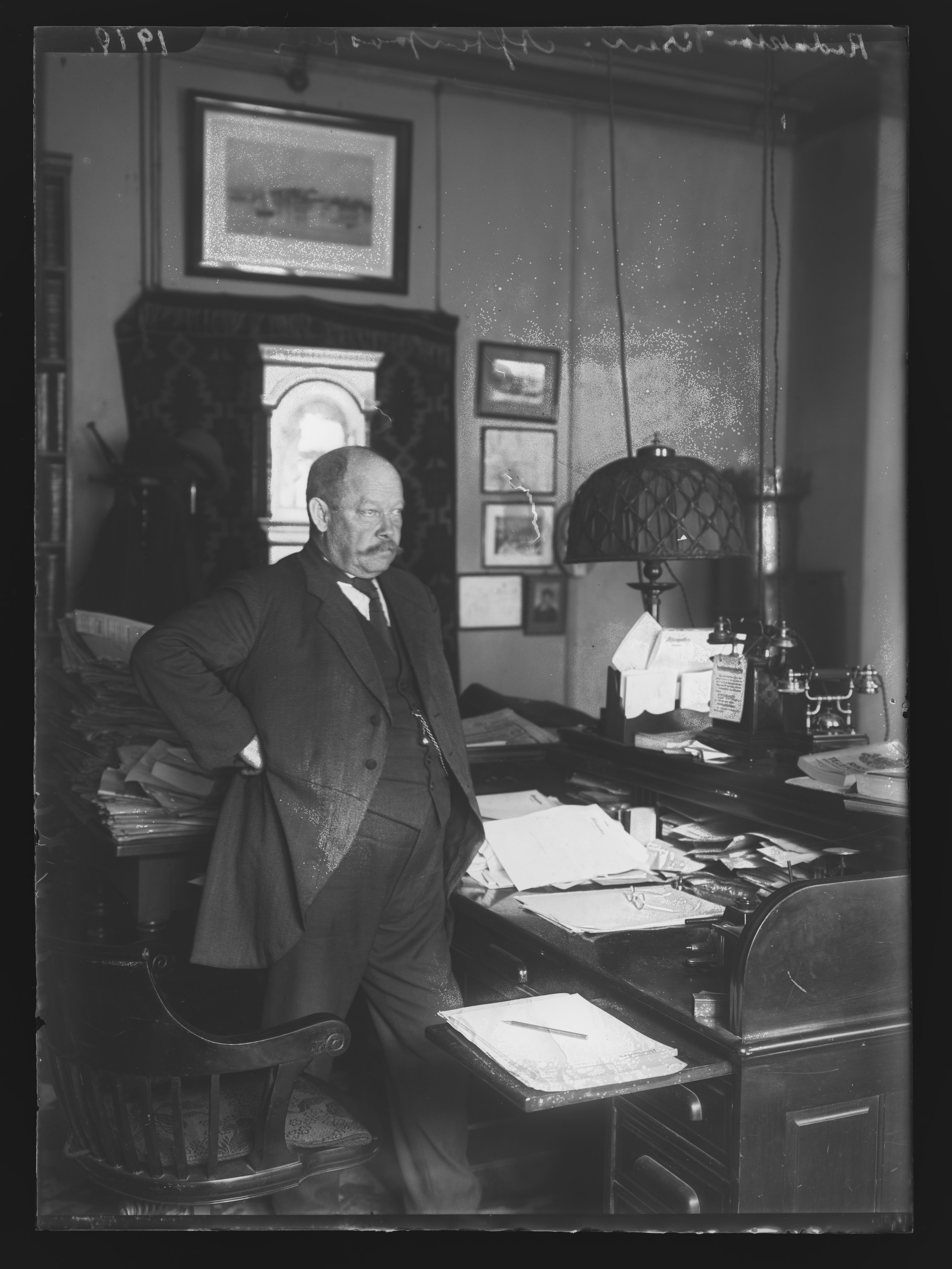
Thorstein Diesen

Halvor Thorstein Romdal Diesen (7 December 1862 – 4 September 1925) was a Norwegian barrister, newspaper editor and politician for the Conservative Party.

== Personal life ==
He was born in Christiania as a son of Søren Diesen (1816–97) and Maren S. Hellerud (1822–1903). In March 1896 in Bergen he married shipmaster's daughter Barbara "Baby" Matzau Gjerding (1874–1933). They had six children, among them the sons Halvor and Einar Diesen who both followed in his footsteps in the press. Through his twin brother, the vicar Søren Einar Munch Diesen, he was an uncle of the television people Thorstein Diesen, Jr. and granduncle of Erik Diesen.

== Career ==
He grew up in Enerhaugen, finished his secondary education in 1881 and graduated from the Royal Frederick University with the cand.jur. degree in 1886. He served as deputy judge in Voss and Hardanger from 1888 to 1890, and then worked as the editor-in-chief of Bergens Aftenblad from 1890 to 1898. He had worked part-time as a copyeditor and journalist in Fædrelandet during his studies, and was more inclined to work on a newspaper desk than as a jurist.

In 1898 Diesen was hired by Emil Stang as the secretary-general of the Conservative Party. When Stang withdrew as leader in 1899, Diesen followed suit and was hired as political editor in Aftenposten which he remained for a year. With both Yngvar Nielsen and Frederik Bætzmann in the political section of the newspaper, it was not enough room for the three. From 1900 Diesen instead returned to the law profession, working as an attorney in a law firm with Otto Bahr Halvorsen. From 1904 he was a barrister with access to working with Supreme Court cases. The family settled in Aker, where Diesen was selected to the school board and elected to the municipal council. He also founded the local newspaper Akersposten in 1901, editing it until 1908.

Diesen returned to Aftenposten and the political editor chair in 1908. When the editor-in-chief died in 1913, Diesen became co-editor-in-chief together with Ola Christofersen. Christofersen almost never wrote in the paper, but handled practical affairs. He was more of a pecuniary strategist than the politically inclined Diesen. Diesen's editorials were signed by a hammer, and were noted as being written in a popular, not always academic, style. He also released political pamphlets and books.

Diesen remained editor-in-chief until his death while vacationing at Larkollen in September 1925. He also chaired the Norwegian Students' Society in 1900, and chaired the Conservative Press Association from 1910 to his death.

Party political offices
Preceded by Hakon Berger	Secretary-general of the Conservative Party; 1898–1899	Succeeded by Johannes Martens
Media offices
Preceded by	Chairman of the Conservative Press Association; 1910–1925	Succeeded by
Preceded by Amandus Schibsted	Chief editor of Aftenposten; 1913–1925 (joint with Ola Christofersen until 1919, then with Frøis Frøisland until 1925)	Succeeded by Frøis Frøisland
