= Helge Dahl =

Helge Dahl (26 May 1921 – 16 December 2004) was a Norwegian educationalist.

He was born in Rjukan as the son of labourers. He finished his secondary education in his hometown in 1940 and graduated with the cand.philol. degree in 1946 at the University in Oslo. From 1947 to 1957 he was a teacher at Tromsø Teacher's College, and took the dr.philos. degree in 1957 with the thesis Språkpolitikk og skolestell i Finnmark 1814–1905. He specialized in the history of education, and wrote Norsk lærerutdanning fra 1814 til i dag (1959), Lærerutdanningen ved Universitetet i Oslo fra 1814 til i dag (1964), Klassisisme og realisme. Den høgre skolen i Norge 1809–1869 (1976), Norsk Lærerskolelag gjennom 75 år (1978). In 1977 he completed Aslak Torjusson's unfinished work Den norske folkehøgskulen. Opphav og grunnlag, a standard work about Norwegian folk high schools. He wrote on Knud Knudsen in 1962 and Niels Treschow in 1965. Dahl also wrote several books and newspaper pieces pertaining to his native Rjukan and Tinn.

After leaving Tromsø Teacher's College in 1958, he worked as a teacher in Rjukan from 1958 to 1963, and was then hired by the University of Oslo. He was promoted to lecturer in 1967 and professor in 1969. Professor Dahl was a fellow of the Norwegian Academy of Science and Letters from 1975, and retired in 1991. He lived at Østerås in his later life, and died in December 2004.
