= List of submissions to the 35th Academy Awards for Best Foreign Language Film =

1962 Best Foreign Language Film submissions

Highlights
- Oscar winner: (France) Sundays and Cybèle
- Submissions: 13
- Debuts: 1

This is a list of submissions to the 35th Academy Awards for Best Foreign Language Film. The Academy Award for Best Foreign Language Film was created in 1956 by the Academy of Motion Picture Arts and Sciences to honor non-English-speaking films produced outside the United States. The award is handed out annually, and is accepted by the winning film's director, although it is considered an award for the submitting country as a whole. Countries are invited by the Academy to submit their best films for competition according to strict rules, with only one film being accepted from each country.

For the 35th Academy Awards, thirteen films were submitted in the category Academy Award for Best Foreign Language Film. South Korea submitted a film for the first time. The five nominated films came from Brazil, France, Greece, Italy and Mexico.

France won for the fifth time with Sundays and Cybèle by Serge Bourguignon, which was also nominated for Best Writing, Screenplay Based on Material from Another Medium and Best Scoring of Music—Adaptation or Treatment in the subsequent ceremony (36th Academy Awards).

== Submissions ==
Submitting country	Film title used in nomination	Original title	Language(s)	Director(s)	Result
Argentina	The Sad Young Men	Los jóvenes viejos	Spanish	Rodolfo Kuhn	Not nominated
Brazil	Keeper of Promises	O Pagador de Promessas	Brazilian Portuguese	Anselmo Duarte	Nominated
Egypt	Chased by the Dogs	اللص والكلاب	Arabic	Kamal El Sheikh	Not nominated
France	Sundays and Cybele	Les Dimanches de Ville d'Avray	French	Serge Bourguignon	Won Academy Award
Greece	Electra	Ηλέκτρα	Greek	Michael Cacoyannis	Nominated
India	Sahib Bibi Aur Ghulam	साहिब बीबी और गुलाम	Hindi	Abrar Alvi	Not nominated
Italy	The Four Days of Naples	Le quattro giornate di Napoli	Italian	Nanni Loy	Nominated
Japan	Being Two Isn't Easy	私は二歳	Japanese	Kon Ichikawa	Not nominated
Mexico	Tlayucan		Spanish	Luis Alcoriza	Nominated
Norway	Cold Tracks	Kalde spor	Norwegian	Arne Skouen	Not nominated
South Korea	My Mother and the Roomer	사랑방 손님과 어머니	Korean	Shin Sang-ok	Not nominated
Spain	Dulcinea		Spanish, English	Vicente Escrivá	Not nominated
Sweden	The Mistress	Älskarinnan	Swedish	Vilgot Sjöman	Not nominated

== Sources ==
- Margaret Herrick Library, Academy of Motion Picture Arts and Sciences
