= Kjell Gjerseth =

Norwegian novelist and journalist (1946–2025)

- Born: 14 September 1946
- Died: 14 January 2025 (aged 78)
- Occupations: novelist journalist
- Notable work: Chakoo
- Awards: Tarjei Vesaas' debutantpris (1983); Narvesen Prize (1983)

Kjell Gjerseth (14 September 1946 – 14 January 2025) was a Norwegian political activist, novelist and journalist, a recipient of the Tarjei Vesaas' debutantpris and the Narvesen Prize.

== Life and career ==
=== Political activism ===
Born on 14 September 1946, Gjerseth hailed from Stavanger. He chaired the Rogaland branch of the Norwegian Young Conservatives in 1969, but eventually left the organization as a protest against the Vietnam War. He graduated as sociologist, and lectured at Høgskulen i Volda for a period. During the 1970s he carried through a process of self-proletarization, became an active member of the Workers' Communist Party, and started working at Jøtul, a manufacturer of cast iron stoves. A union leader, he also fronted a wildcat strike in 1976.

=== Journalism ===
Gjerseth later worked as journalist, first for the newspaper Klassekampen, and thereafter for Stavanger Aftenblad. As journalist he specialized in conflict areas, in particular the Soviet–Afghan War. He also reported from Baghdad during the Gulf War, partly as the only present Western journalist. He was later based in the Jordan capital of Amman for several years.

=== Writing ===
He was awarded the Tarjei Vesaas' debutantpris in 1983 for the novel Chakoo. Among his other books is Hvis du ikke er snill. Historier om Lindøy from 1993. He was awarded the Narvesen Prize in 1983 for his journalistic work.

=== Death ===
Gjerseth died on 14 January 2025, at the age of 78.

Awards
Preceded by Vårt Land	Recipient of the Narvesen Prize; 1983	Succeeded by Knut Fjeld
