= Stein Kuhnle =

Norwegian political scientist

- Born: 22 November 1947 (age 78); Bergen, Norway
- Occupation: Political scientist
- Father: Jacob R. Kuhnle

Stein Kuhnle (born 22 November 1947) is a Norwegian political scientist.

He was born in Bergen, a son of Jacob R. Kuhnle. He was appointed professor of comparative politics at the University of Bergen in 1982. Among his works is Velferdsstaten from 1985, and in 1995 he was co-editor of a book on the theory of political scientist Stein Rokkan. He is a fellow of the Norwegian Academy of Science and Letters.
