= Henry Imsland =

Norwegian illustrator

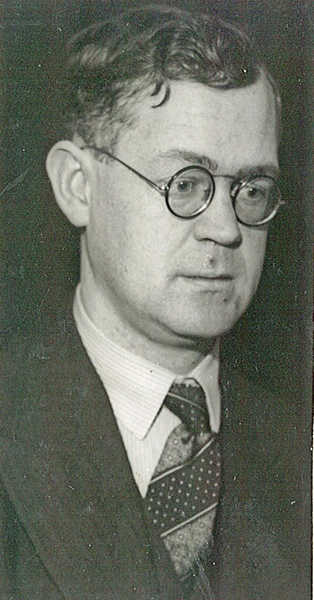
Henry Imsland, c. 1940

Henry Imsland (27 May 1900 – 14 June 1981) was a Norwegian illustrator.

He was born in Stavanger as a son of Jacob Imsland (1868–1950) and Henriette Knudsen (1871–1941). He married Dorthea Grude (1906–1982). He became deaf at the age of nine, but dedicated himself to drawing. He studied at the Norwegian National Academy of Craft and Art Industry from 1916 to 1920, among others with Johan Nordhagen as a teacher.

He made his debut exhibit at Statens kunstutstilling in 1919, and got his first newspaper job in Stavanger Aftenblad. In the first years he also drew advertisements, and founded and edited the humorous magazine Molboposten in 1924. In 1929 he was given a permanent position as illustrator in Stavanger Aftenblad. He worked here until his death. He also illustrated covers for books by Per Thomsen and Theodor Dahl among others. He also contributed to Tidens Tegn, Verdens Gang, Morgenbladet, Arbeiderbladet, Bergens Tidende, Farmand, Den 1ste Mai (both Conservative, Liberal and Social Democratic newspapers). He was awarded the Narvesen Prize in 1958. As an illustrator winning this prize he was only preceded by Gösta Hammarlund in 1955 and only succeeded by Ellen Auensen in 1973. He died in June 1981 in Stavanger.

Awards
Preceded by Jorunn Johnsen	Recipient of the Narvesen Prize; 1958	Succeeded by Terje Baalsrud
