= Aslak Torjusson =

Norwegian educator (1891–1973)

Aslak Torjusson (4 March 1891 – 26 April 1973) was a Norwegian educator.

He was born in Rauland Municipality. He took teacher's education at the Holmestrand Seminary in Holmestrand in 1912, finished secondary education in 1918 and graduated from the Royal Frederick University with the cand.philol. degree in 1923. While doing so he was a primary school teacher from 1912 to 1920 and then a teacher at Telemark Folk High School for four years.

From 1927 to 1936 he was the secretary of Noregs Mållag. He was then the headmaster of Buskerud Folk High School from 1936 to 1952 and lecturer at Sagene Teachers' College from 1952 to 1961. He was also a board member of the Norwegian Broadcasting Corporation from 1933 to 1947.

He issued the book Frøydis Haavardsholm og norsk leid i dekorativ kunst in 1933. He did not manage to complete his standard work about Norwegian folk high schools—Den norske folkehøgskulen. Opphav og grunnlag—within his lifespan, but it was finished by Helge Dahl in 1977.

He died in April 1973. His daughter Anne Torjusson Diesen was assisting director of television in the Norwegian Broadcasting Corporation in the 1990s, and an experienced journalist covering the Norwegian Royal Court. She was married to Erik Diesen.
