= Peder Christian Andersen =

Norwegian sports official and journalist

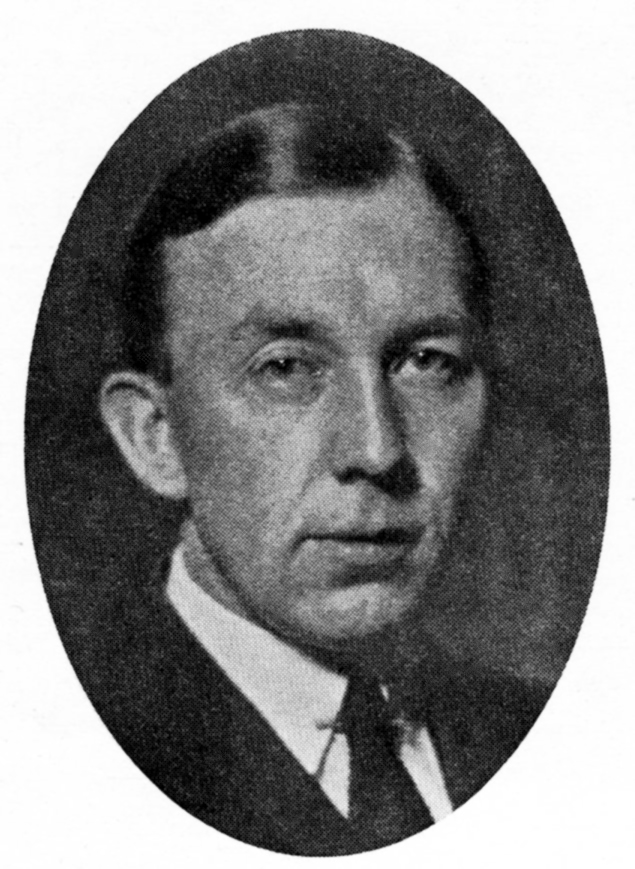
Peder Christian Andersen

Peder Christian Andersen, often shortened to P. Chr. Andersen (5 April 1892 – 12 March 1964) was a Norwegian sports official and journalist.

He was born in Sagene as a son of a weaver. He finished middle school in 1909, and was employed in the magazine Sport. His most notable assignment here was reporting from the 1912 Summer Olympics, the stay at which he paid himself. He was hired in the labour movement newspaper Social-Demokraten as a sports journalist. He left for political reasons in 1919 and was hired in Aftenposten. He was promoted to sub-editor in 1925 and news editor in 1945. He retired in 1963. He is known for recruiting Sverre Mitsem to write the satirical column "SORRY e. Trollhaugens Tass" for Aftenposten. Mitsem did so from 1946 to 1996. Andersen also founded, published and edited the magazine Idrettsliv from 1915 to 1928. In 1945 he contributed to Oslopressen. He wrote several books.

Andersen was active in the sport of association football, and officiated matches at the 1924 Summer Olympics as well as three Norwegian football cup finals and the inauguration match of Ullevaal stadion in 1926. He co-founded and played for SFK Njord from 1912; the club was a predecessor of Skeid. He was a board member of the Football Association of Norway from 1914 to 1918 and 1926 to 1926, and secretary from 1918 to 1925. He also commented football matches in the early age of Norwegian radio. Among the notable tournaments commented by Andersen were Football at the 1936 Summer Olympics and the 1938 FIFA World Cup.

Andersen received the Narvesen Prize for journalism in 1960, and was decorated with the Order of the Dannebrog. He was married to Mimi Petersen (1893–1975) since 1919, had two daughters, and died in March 1964 in Oslo.

Awards
Preceded by Terje Baalsrud	Recipient of the Narvesen Prize; 1960 (shared with Henning Sinding-Larsen)	Succeeded by Jacob R. Kuhnle
