= Jorunn Johnsen =

Norwegian journalist

Jorunn Johnsen (24 November 1905 – 1 May 1984) was a Norwegian journalist.

Johnsen studied in Berlin and Oslo, and worked three years at Christianssands Tidende before being hired at Aftenposten in 1936, where she reported for the rest of her career. Johnsen specialized in reporting on social issues. From January 1944 to March 1945, Johnsen was imprisoned at the Grini concentration camp for "German-hostile behaviour", during the German occupation of Norway.

Johnsen was awarded the Narvesen Prize in 1957, and also received the HM The King's Medal of Merit.

Jorunn Johnsen died in May 1984 in Oslo.

Awards
Preceded by Asbjørn Barlaup	Recipient of the Narvesen Prize; 1958	Succeeded by Henry Imsland
