= Anders Stilloff =

Norwegian journalist, playwright, newspaper editor and theatre critic

- Born: 19 April 1866; Vang, Norway
- Died: 1941 (aged 74–75)
- Occupations: journalist, playwright, newspaper editor, theatre critic
- Known for: First editor of Morgenavisen

Anders Stilloff (19 April 1866 – 1941) was a Norwegian journalist, playwright, newspaper editor and theatre critic. His theatre debut was the play Sagfører Hellmanns from 1902. He was the first editor of the Bergen newspaper Morgenavisen, which he edited from 1902 to 1915.
