= Schwester Selma =

Israeli nurse

- שווסטר זלמה
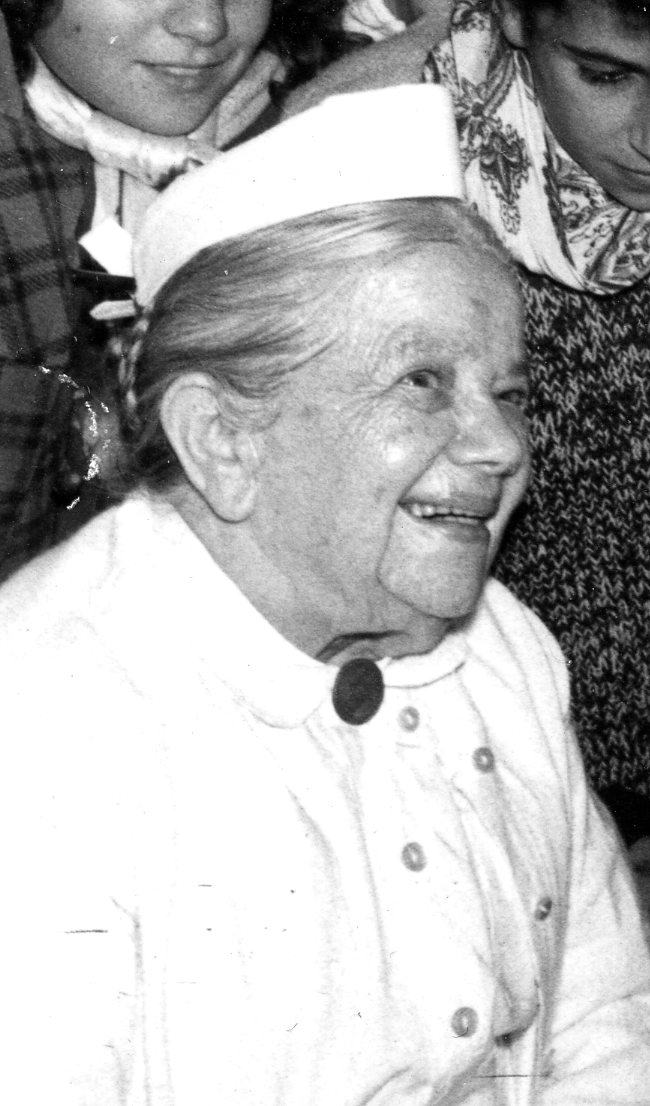
- Schwester Selma, 1968
- Born: Selma Mayer; 3 February 1884; Hanover, Germany
- Died: 5 February 1984 (aged 100); Jerusalem, Israel
- Occupation: Head nurse at Shaare Zedek Hospital

Selma Mayer (3 February 1884 – 5 February 1984) known as Schwester Selma (German: Sister Selma or Nurse Selma; Hebrew: שווסטר זלמה) was an Israeli nurse who was the head nurse at the original Shaare Zedek Hospital on Jaffa Road in Jerusalem for nearly 50 years. For many years she was the right-hand assistant of the hospital's founding director, Dr. Moshe Wallach. Working long hours and with limited infrastructure, she trained and supervised all personnel at the hospital from 1916 to the 1930s, and founded the Shaare Zedek School of Nursing in 1934. She never married, and resided in a room in the hospital until her last day. In her later years she became known as the "Jewish Florence Nightingale" for her decades of selfless devotion to patient welfare.

== Early life and education ==
Selma Mayer was born on 3 February 1884, in Hanover, Germany, to a poor Jewish family. Her mother died in childbirth when Selma was five years old, leaving five young orphans. Selma later wrote, "Because I lost my mother very early and therefore had a rather difficult youth, a strong need grew in me to give people that which I had missed so much: mother-love and love of human beings. Therefore I chose the profession of nursing".

In 1906 she began working as a nurse at the Salomon Heine Hospital in Hamburg. She received on-the-job training in the hospital's departments of internal medicine, surgery, pediatrics, and obstetrics. In 1913 she and another nurse passed the government's nursing licensing exams, becoming the first Jewish nurses to receive a German State Diploma.

== Head nurse ==
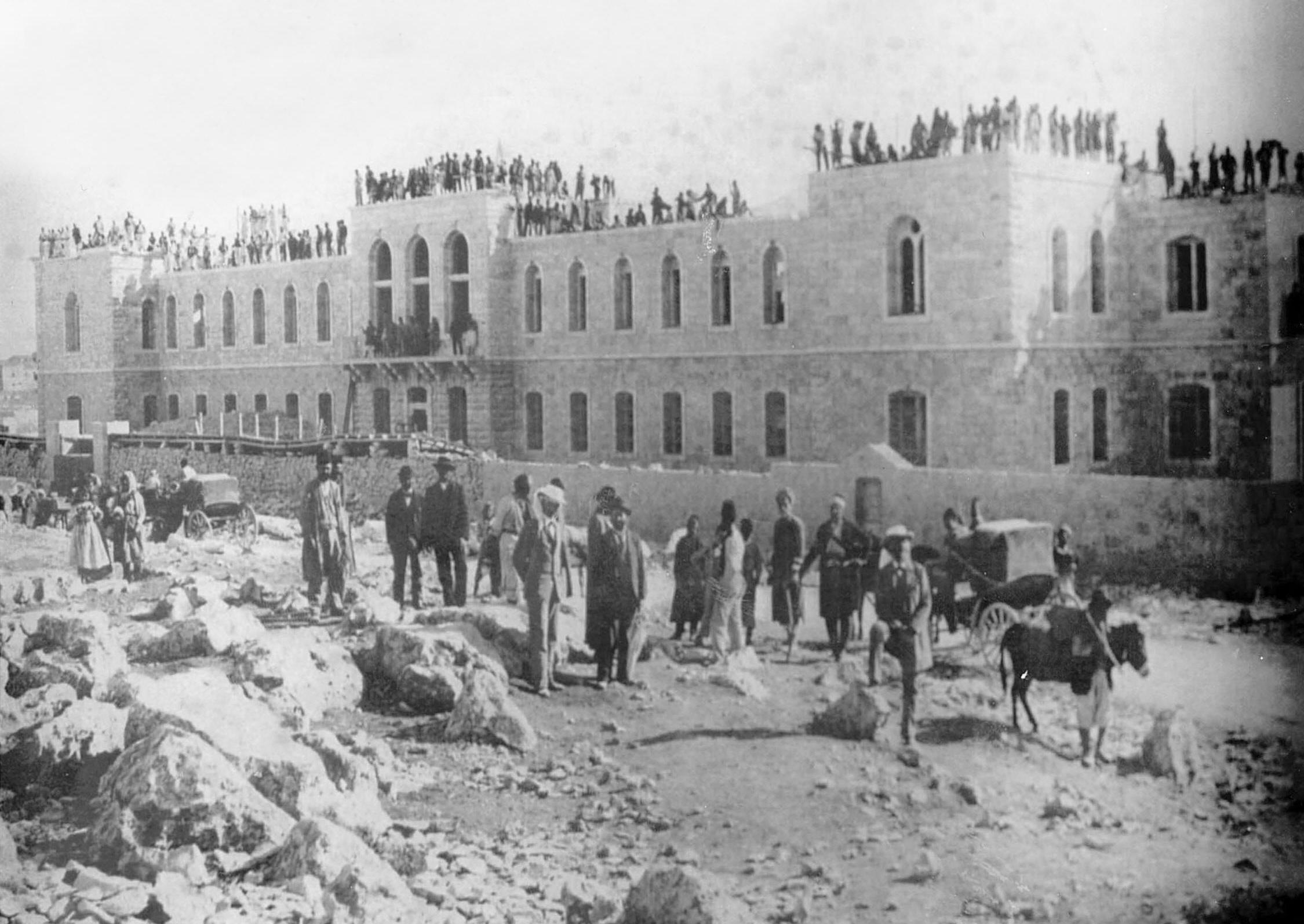
Shaare Zedek Hospital under construction, circa 1901.

In 1890 the Frankfurt-based Central Committee for the Construction of a Jewish Hospital in Jerusalem sent Dr. Moshe Wallach, a German-Jewish doctor, to Palestine to open a Jewish hospital. In 1902 he opened Shaare Zedek Hospital on Jaffa Road, the first Jewish hospital in the New City. Wallach began with two trained European nurses, Schwester Stybel and Schwester Van Gelder, but one quit due to the "primitive conditions" that existed at Shaare Zedek in those years and the other fled to Germany during World War I. In dire need of a head nurse, Wallach returned to Europe in 1916, during World War I. He was impressed with the similar organizational structure of the Salomon Heine Hospital in Hamburg, and asked the head nurse there if she could spare one of her staff. The 32-year-old Selma Mayer was recommended, and agreed to a three-year contract to fulfill her war service in Palestine.

Embarking on a four-week train journey through Central Europe, Turkey, and Damascus, Schwester Selma arrived at Shaare Zedek in December 1916. Several weeks later, Jerusalem was hit by a year-long typhoid epidemic, and typhus and meningitis also raged in the city. The 40-bed hospital, which added another 110 beds to accommodate patients, was inundated. The hospital recruited untrained workers, whom Schwester Selma outfitted in "overalls and hoods" to protect them from infection; she ordered all incoming patients washed and shaved over their entire bodies. Schwester Selma also introduced German standards of nursing to the wards, including white uniforms for all hospital personnel, changing of uniforms and bed sheets daily, and daily bathing of all patients.

While attempting to provide a high level of patient care for Jews, Christians, and Arabs, Shaare Zedek operated without electricity, indoor plumbing, central heating, or gas cooking stoves. Kerosene heaters were used to warm bathwater, and paraffin lamps were used in the operating room. It was difficult to retain staff due to the working conditions and to the exacting, temperamental nature of Dr. Wallach. Nevertheless, Schwester Selma worked 18-hour days, and expected her nurses and aides to display the same work ethic.

During that era, hospital nurses and midwives were trained on the job. Schwester Selma trained and supervised all the nurses, operating-room nurses, and midwives in the hospital, to include not only teaching the former how to make hospital beds, how to diaper newborns but also swaddle infants. Sometimes she also substituted for the midwives, who did not live on the premises. For many years, Schwester Selma was Dr. Wallach's right-hand assistant in the areas of uterine curettages, tracheotomies, and ritual circumcisions, accompanied him on house calls, and stood in for him as hospital director when he was away. From 1916 to 1930 she was also in charge of supplies and building maintenance, and making sure the kashrut in the kitchen met Dr. Wallach's strict standards.

In the wards, she cultivated a spirit of warm, personalized patient care that continues to be the modus operandi for the hospital to this day. She would constantly remind her students, "Those who come to us need help". She wrote in her memoir, "Above all they should remember and never forget that one has to try everything when dealing with the patient to cause him as little pain as possible and to spare no effort".

Schwester Selma's contract included a three-month vacation in Germany every three years, but she took advantage of that clause only twice, in 1922 and 1925. In 1927 she was offered the position of head nurse at the Eidingen Stift Institution, a Jewish hospital in Leipzig. While she seriously considered the offer, the Frankfurt-based board of directors of Shaare Zedek convinced her not to leave, with a promise "to support her for the rest of her life".

Schwester Selma was the only operating-room nurse on duty during the 1929 Hebron massacre. A rescue team managed to evacuate the wounded from Hebron and rush them to the Shaare Zedek and Hadassah hospitals in Jerusalem. Specialists from throughout Jerusalem came to Shaare Zedek to operate on the wounded, and Schwester Selma assisted them for 23 hours without a break.

The November 1947 United Nations Partition Plan for Palestine was announced during her annual two-week holiday, which she spent with friends in Naharia. Immediately after the adoption of the resolution by the UN General Assembly, 1947–48 Civil War broke out, leading to an Arab siege of Jerusalem. Desiring to return to her post at the hospital, Schwester Selma spent three weeks petitioning the offices of the British Mandatory government, the incoming Israeli government, and even the underground leaders, to assist her. Finally the army agreed to put her on one of its armed convoys supplying food and medicine to the besieged city.

During Israel's polio epidemic in the early 1950s, Shaare Zedek was the only hospital in Jerusalem with an isolation ward. Schwester Selma displayed unceasing devotion to the running of the iron lung machines, teaching and supervising the untrained personnel who were recruited to work in the ward.

== Shaare Zedek School of Nursing ==
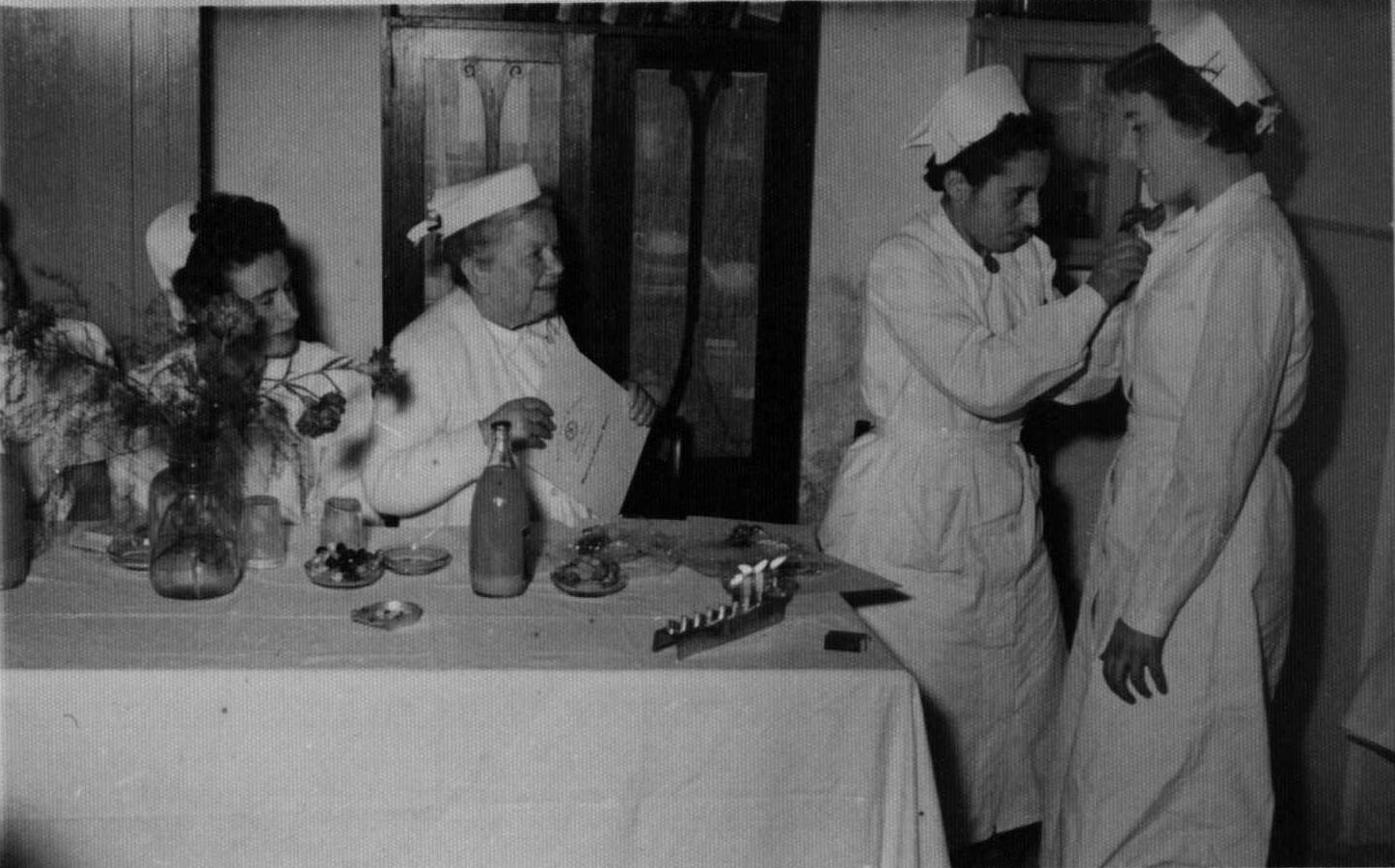
A nursing-school graduate receives a nurse's pin as Schwester Selma (second left) looks on, circa 1954.

In 1934 Schwester Selma founded the Shaare Zedek Nursing School. The idea was initially opposed by Dr. Wallach, who worried that the school would emphasize theory over practical nursing, but Schwester Selma's curriculum proved him wrong. Examinations following the three-year course of study were administered by doctors from the British government hospital in Jerusalem. Schwester Selma taught all the practical nursing classes in the school's early years. After her death, the school instituted a Schwester Selma Award, which is bestowed on each year's outstanding graduate.

== Personal life ==
A diminutive figure who stood less than 5 feet (1.5 m) tall, Schwester Selma was known for her kindness and her scrupulousness. She adopted as her personal motto a poem by Indian poet Rabindranath Tagore, which she kept on the wall in her room:

I slept and dreamt
that life was joy.
I awoke and saw
that life was duty.
I acted and behold,
duty was joy.

She never married. Both she and Dr. Wallach, who also never married, lived in separate rooms in the hospital. She often welcomed staff and patients for a chat in her sparsely furnished room, where she poured them cups of mint tea.

Schwester Selma and Dr. Wallach adopted three girls who had been abandoned in the hospital. One was Samoohah Calderon, whose mother had died and whose father had been drafted into the Turkish army; the infant's grandparents asked them to keep the baby. The second adoptee, Bolissa, was given to them by her father, who had carried her all the way from Syria; her mother had died en route. Bolissa was killed in the 1948 Ben Yehuda Street bombing. The third adoptee was named Sarina. The girls grew up on hospital grounds and were sent to school; one of the girls became a nurse; another a dental technician.

== Awards and recognition ==
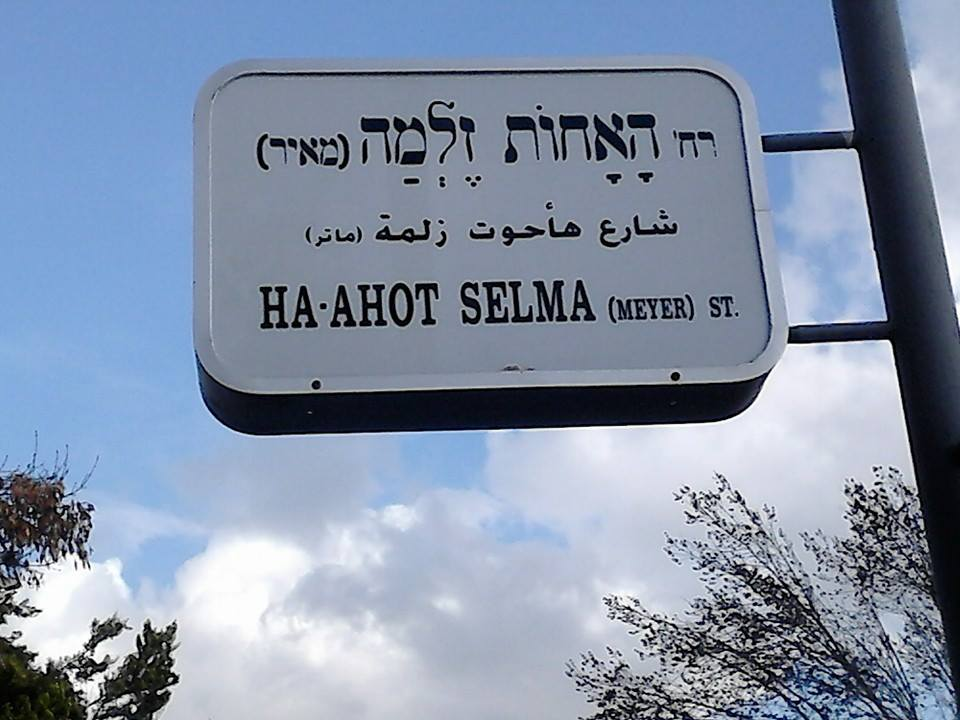
Nurse Selma Street in Jerusalem

In 1974, at the age of 90, Schwester Selma was named a "Worthy of Jerusalem" by Jerusalem Mayor Teddy Kollek. A Time cover story on 29 December 1975, named her as one of the world's "living saints" in a list that included Mother Teresa, Sister Annie, Dom Hélder Câmara, and Father Matta El Meskeen. Numerous publications called her the "Jewish Florence Nightingale" for her decades of selfless devotion to patient welfare.

Schwester Selma once received a diamond ring from a Holocaust survivor whose sister had given her the valuable item before she was deported, saying, "If I do not return, give it to a human being who has never married and has devoted her life to helping other people". When the survivor read about Schwester Selma in the European press, she gave the ring to her.

== Later life and death ==
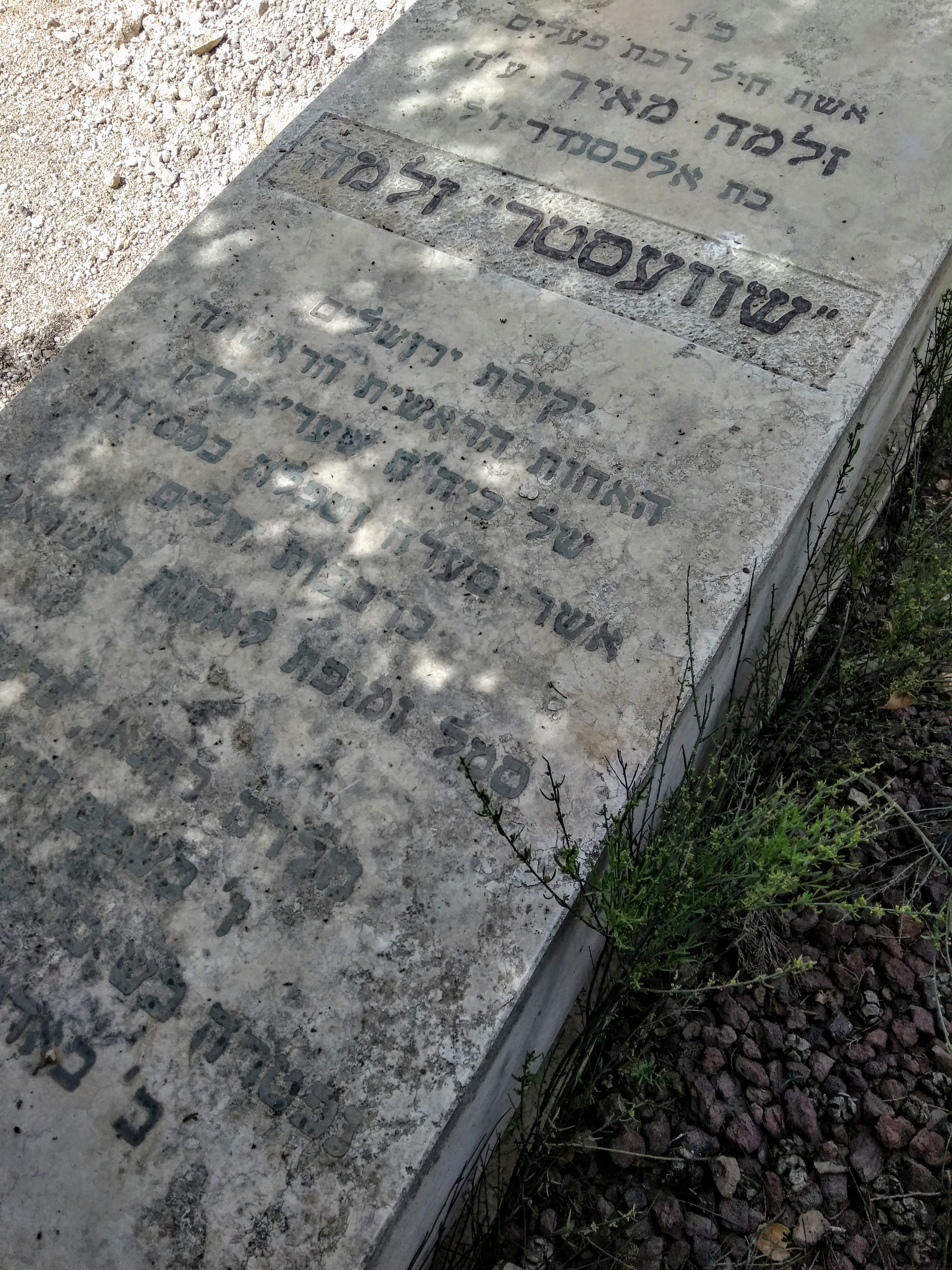
Grave of Schwester Selma, Har Hamenuhot, Jerusalem

Schwester Selma continued to work into her eighties. Even at that age, she did not consider it beneath her dignity to pick up trash from the floors, reminding her students that "there is nothing humiliating in our work". In 1973, while recuperating from a cataract operation, she dictated a short memoir, "Mein Leben und Erlebnisse im Shaare Zedek Spital" ("My Life and Experiences at 'Shaare Zedek'").

When the hospital moved to new and more modern headquarters in the Bayit Vegan neighborhood in 1980, Schwester Selma moved along with it. She died on Sunday, 5 February 1984, two days after her hundredth birthday – the same day a special tribute event had been planned in her honor at the hospital.

== Sources ==
- Calian, Carnegie Samuel (1982). Today's Pastor in Tomorrow's World. Westminster Press. ISBN 0-664-24426-2. "schwester selma."
- Linn, Dennis (1978). Healing Life's Hurts: Healing Memories Through Five Stages of Forgiveness. Paulist Press. p. 172. ISBN 0-8091-2059-3.
- Schwester Selma (1973). My Life and Experiences at 'Shaare Zedek'. Shaare Zedek Medical Center. Archived from the original on 8 December 2019.
- Steinberg, Ruth (1988). "Schwester Selma". In Wolpin, Rabbi Nisson (ed.). The Torah Profile: A Treasury of Biographical Sketches. Mesorah Publications, Ltd. ISBN 0-89906-860-X.
- Teller, Hanoch (1996). A Midrash and a Maaseh. Vol. 2. Feldheim Publishers. ISBN 1-881939-09-X.
- Zakon, Miriam (1999). A Sister in White: The story of Schvester Selma. Targum Press. ISBN 1-56871-186-7.
