= Buskerud Folk High School =

Folk high school in Norway

Coordinates: 59.6927°N 9.7943°E

Buskerud Folk High School (Norwegian: Buskerud Folkehøgskole) is a secular folk high school located in Darbu, Øvre Eiker municipality, Buskerud county, Norway. It identifies itself as an art and culture school, and admits about 90 students every year. It is owned by the Buskerud school association, and its current principal is Mariann Aaland.

It was founded on 8 October 1909. Former principals include Arild Mikkelsen and Aslak Torjusson from 1936 to 1952.

Special courses taught include:

- Film and animation
- Creative Gaming
- eSport
- Writing
- Rock & metal
- Cartoons & Illustration
- Cosplay Unleashed
