= Theodor Dahl =

Norwegian writer and journalist (1886–1946)

- Born: 4 November 1886; Klepp Municipality, Norway
- Died: 5 May 1946 (aged 59); Stavanger, Norway
- Occupations: Journalist and fiction writer

Theodor Dahl (4 November 1886 – 5 May 1946) was a Norwegian journalist, short story writer, novelist and poet.

== Personal life ==
Dahl was born in Klepp Municipality to watchmaker and schoolteacher Kristian Dahl and Karen Torkildsdotter Engelsvoll. In 1905 he married Ingeborg Pedersen.

== Career ==
Dahl was a journalist for the newspaper Stavanger Avis from 1906. He edited Stavanger Morgenblad from 1911 to 1912, worked for Vestlandsposten from 1914 to 1916, and thereafter for Stavangeren. He made his literary debut in 1921 with the story collection Lyngheisfolk. Further books are the novels Hanalandshanen (1922), Manden paa Timpelleitet (1923), Runest-krosset (1927), and Tre lys og to skjebner (1932). In 1938 he published the poetry collection Jeg kranser min jord. He then wrote a number of memoir books, including Under Jærens himmel (1942), Jæren i syn og minne (1943), Til deg du hei (1944), Humor frå hav til hei (1944), and the posthumous Byen og menneskene (1947). Dahl's tales are typically set in Jæren, often depicting the drama and poetry of nature along with folklore and historical elements. Several of his books are illustrated by Henry Imsland.
