= Annie Skau Berntsen =

Norwegian missionary from (1948-1978)

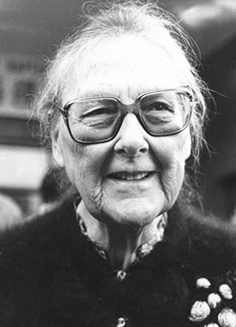
Annie Skau Berntsen (c. 1980s)

Annie Skau Berntsen (Chinese: 司務道), also known as Sister Annie (29 May 1911 – 26 November 1992) was a Norwegian missionary who served in China and Hong Kong.

== Biography ==
After training as a nurse, she worked at both the Ullevål Hospital in Oslo and at the Dikemark, a psychiatric hospital in Asker. By the age of 27, she had joined the Norwegian Missionary Association (Det Norske Misjonsforbund).

On 23 December 1938 Annie arrived in Shaanxi, a province in northern China. She remained in the country until the conclusion of the Chinese Civil War in 1950. At 190 cm, she was often the tallest woman the Chinese locals had ever seen before. However the defeat of the Kuomintang made it impossible for foreign missionaries to remain in China, so she was forced to leave in 1951.

From 1952 she coordinated relief work among Chinese refugees in Hong Kong. In 1953 she helped co-found a tuberculosis sanatorium with Helen Wilson, a missionary from Scotland. In 2013 the Haven of Hope Hospital celebrated its 60th anniversary providing services specially designed for elderly people with chronic illness living in the community.

Annie became a national hero in Norway when her life as a missionary was told on the Norwegian program "This is Your Life" (Dette er ditt liv). In 1963 she was appointed as a First Class Knight of St. Olav. She married Reidar Berntsen in Norway on 25 June 1966, and continued her missionary work in Hong Kong on Haven on Hope Hospital and Mission Covenant Church, until her retirement in 1978.

A 29 December 1975 Time magazine cover story named her as one of the world's "living saints" in a list that included Mother Teresa, Schwester Selma, Hélder Câmara, and Matta El Meskeen.

== Family ==
Her brother Bjørn Skau, was a former Norwegian attorney general.

== Books by Annie Skau Berntsen ==
- My Chinese Diary – My Yes to Life (Min kinesiske dagbok – mitt ja til livet), Oslo, 1986.
- My Father's Daughter. from the Desert Light to the Source Bed. Journal Leaves from a Life Among the Chinese (Min fars datter. Fra ørkenslette til kildevang. Dagboksblader fra et liv blant kinesere), Oslo, 1988.
- Lovely on the Mountains, Hong Kong.

== Literature ==
- Arvid Møller and Lasse Thorseth: Annie Skau, Oslo, 1977
- Sverre S. Salvesen: Sister Annie in China and Hong Kong (Søster Annies stordåd i Kina og Hong Kong), 1967.
- Sverre S. Amundsen and Svenn Otto Brechan: Sister Annie - Child Protection: A Biography of Youth (Søster Annie – barnas beskytter: en biografi for ungdom), Ansgar, 1989 – ISBN 82-503-0889-1
- Arvid Møller: Sister Annie: At Home in the Sky (Søster Annie: Hjemme i himlen), Lunde Forlag, Oslo, 1993 – ISBN 82-520-3836-0
- Haven of Hope Christian Service og Haven of Hope Evangelistic Fellowship (utg.): A Grain Of Wheat ─ A Memorial Album of Sister Annie Skau Berntsen, Hong Kong, 1994
- Haven of Hope Christian Service og Haven of Hope Evangelistic Fellowship (utg.): Trails of Glad Tidings in Shaanxi (In Chinese, with English translation), Hong Kong
- Haven of Hope Christian Service and Haven of Hope Evangelistic Fellowship (utg.): 荒原上 (written in Chinese), Hong Kong.
