= Cold Tracks =

1962 film

- Directed by: Arne Skouen
- Written by: Arne Skouen; Johan Borgen
- Starring: Toralv Maurstad
- Cinematography: Ragnar Sørensen
- Release date: 1962
- Running time: 96 minutes
- Country: Norway
- Language: Norwegian

Cold Tracks (Norwegian: Kalde spor) is a 1962 Norwegian drama film directed by Arne Skouen. The film was selected as the Norwegian entry for the Best Foreign Language Film at the 35th Academy Awards, but was not accepted as a nominee. It was also entered into the 3rd Moscow International Film Festival.

== Cast ==
- Toralv Maurstad as Oddmund
- Henny Moan as Ragnhild
- Alf Malland as Tormod
- Ragnhild Hald
- Sverre Holm
- Egil Lorck
- Lasse Næss
- Siv Skjønberg

== See also ==
- List of submissions to the 35th Academy Awards for Best Foreign Language Film
- List of Norwegian submissions for the Academy Award for Best Foreign Language Film
