= Totto Osvold =

Norwegian radio entertainer (1941–2023)

- Born: Werner Osvold; 21 June 1941; Ålesund, Reichskommissariat Norwegen (today Norway)
- Died: 3 June 2023 (aged 81)
- Occupation: Radio entertainer
- Spouse: Sissel Benneche Osvold
- Children: 1, including Katja
- Awards: Spellemannprisen (1973)

Werner “Totto” Osvold (21 June 1941 – 3 June 2023) was a Norwegian radio entertainer.

== Personal life ==
Born in Ålesund on 21 June 1941, Osvold was married to journalist Sissel Benneche Osvold. Their daughter Katja was a vocalist in Life... But How to Live It?

== Career ==
Osvold was assigned with the Norwegian Broadcasting Corporation from 1965 to 2006, as entertainer, and from 1986 to 1990 as program editor. He is known from radio shows such as Nitimen and Søndagsposten, and for his cooperation with "Stutum" and with humorist Harald Heide-Steen Jr. Bjørn Sand and Osvold were awarded Spellemannprisen in 1973 for their album Stutum Speaking.

Osvold died on 3 June 2023, at the age of 81.
