= Knut Domaas =

Norwegian newspaper editor

Knut Domaas (1873–1959) was a Norwegian newspaper editor.

He was born in Lesja Municipality. He started working in the newspaper Kysten in 1902 and became editor-in-chief in 1903. He started working in the newspaper Norges Handels- og Sjøfartstidende in 1912 and was editor-in-chief from 1914 to 1943. In the 1930s he was a member of the council of Norges Forsvarsforening.

Media offices
Preceded by Thoralf Pryser	Chairman of the Norwegian Press Association; 1928–1930	Succeeded by Thorvald Aadahl
Preceded by Thorvald Aadahl	Chairman of the Norwegian Press Association; 1934–1935	Succeeded by Johannes Nesse
