= Sissel Benneche Osvold =

Norwegian journalist (born 1945)

- Born: 4 April 1945 (age 80); Stavanger, Norway
- Occupation: Journalist
- Spouse: Totto Osvold
- Parent: Gerd Benneche
- Awards: Fritt Ord Honorary Award

Sissel Benneche Osvold (born 4 April 1945) is a Norwegian journalist. She was assigned to the newspaper Dagbladet for nearly 35 years, and received the Fritt Ord Honorary Award in 2007.

== Personal life ==
Born in Stavanger on 4 April 1945, Benneche Osvold is a daughter of Gerd Benneche, and was married to Totto Osvold. Their daughter Katja was a vocalist in the punk band Life... But How to Live It?

== Career ==
She worked for the newspaper Dagbladet from 1973 to 2007, where she had her own column, Sidesprang, from 1990. She was awarded Den Store Journalistprisen by the Norwegian Press Association in 1992. In 2007, she received the Fritt Ord Honorary Award.

She retired in 2007, and a selection of her newspaper articles are contained in the collection Siste stikk (2007), edited by her daughter Katja.
