= Aktietrykkeriet =

Former Norwegian printing and publishing company

Aktietrykkeriet was a Norwegian printing and publishing company active from 1884 to 2014.

Aktietrykkeriet was founded in 1884 by Christian Holtermann Knudsen under the name Arbeidernes Aktietrykkeri and eventually became part of the newspaper Social Demokraten—later known as Arbeiderbladet, and today called Dagsavisen. At the very beginning at Brugata (Bridge Street) no. 17a in Oslo, Knudsen and his wife, who loaded the paper, used a hand-operated press. Knudsen was a fervent social democrat and together with Carl Jeppesen, among others, established one of Norway's first printers' unions in 1872. Despite major financial problems, he released the first issue of the newspaper Vort Arbeide in March 1885, an event that led to the formation of the Social Democratic Association in Kristiania.

In 1983, Terje André Hildeng purchased the company from the labor movement, with the requirement that the employees own ten percent.

The printing company was located in the municipality of Fet and had a turnover of NOK 154 million in 2012.

The company closed in 2014.
