= Sven Sønsteby =

Norwegian illustrator (1933–2014)

- Born: 20 May 1933; Oslo
- Died: 5 May 2014 (aged 80); Kristiansand
- Occupation: Illustrator

Sven Sønsteby (20 May 1933 – 5 May 2014) was a Norwegian illustrator. He was born in Oslo. He was assigned as illustrator for the newspaper Aftenposten from the 1950s, and for the newspaper's weekly supplement A-magasinet from 1963. From 1956 he also delivered works to the London-based satirical magazine Punch.

He died in Kristiansand on 5 May 2014.
