= Salo Grenning =

Norwegian illustrator (1918–1986)

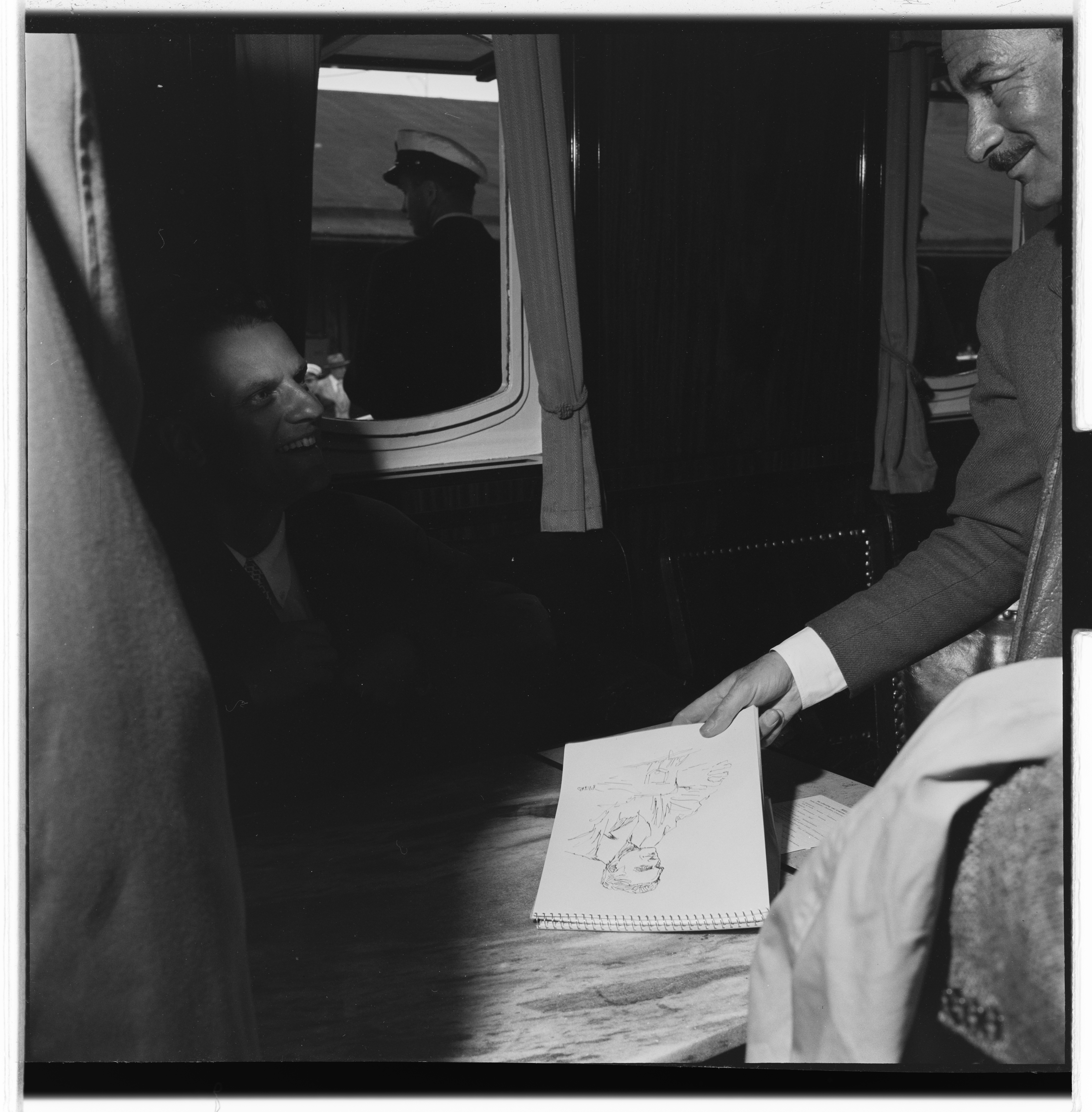

Salo Grenning, pen name Pedro (5 April 1918 – 1 February 1986) was a Norwegian illustrator.

He was born as Salo Goldfarb in Bergen as a son of businessman Leopold Goldfarb (from Rajgród, lived 1878–1933) and Sonja Epstein (from Suwałki, lived 1888–1970). His first newspaper drawing was published in 1933 in Bergens Arbeiderblad. He studied at the Belfast School of Art from 1935 to 1936, at the Bergen National Academy of the Arts from 1936 to 1937 and at Norwegian National Academy of Craft and Art Industry from 1937 to 1938. He adopted the pen name Pedro in February 1941, one year after Nazi Germany invaded and occupied Norway. He fled to the United Kingdom in 1941, via Shetland (together with Leif Andreas Larsen) to Scotland. In 1944, as a soldier in the British Army, he participated in the liberation of Walcheren and Middelburg, later becoming an honorary citizen of the latter.

From 1944 to 1945 he was an illustrator in London-based newspaper Norsk Tidend. After the war he was decorated with the Norwegian Defence Medal and the British Defence Medal. In 1945 he legally changed his name from Goldfarb to Grenning. He was also hired in the new newspaper Verdens Gang, specifically at the initiative of journalist Asbjørn Barlaup. Pedro remained in Verdens Gang for the rest of his career. He also designed book covers. His works have been exhibited at Høstutstillingen, and his works are owned by the Montreal Museum of Fine Arts and the National Museum of Art, Architecture and Design.

In July 1961 in Stavern he married Bjørg Sigrunn Støland (1924–1998). He died in February 1986 in Oslo.
