= Einar Diesen =

Norwegian journalist and newspaper editor

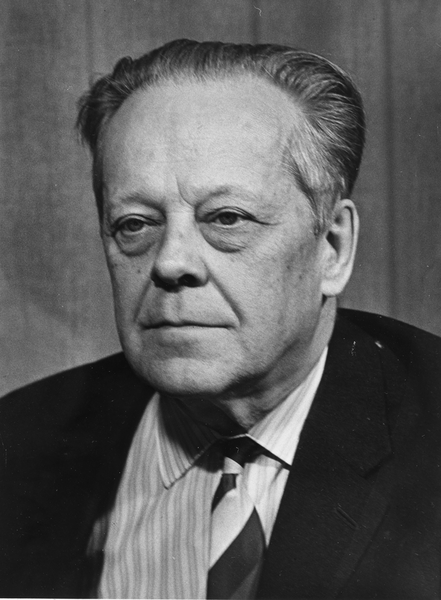
- Born: 4 October 1897; Bergen, Norway
- Died: 8 May 1994 (aged 96)
- Occupations: journalist and newspaper editor
- Parent: Thorstein Diesen

Einar Diesen (4 October 1897 – 8 May 1994) was a Norwegian journalist and newspaper editor.

Søren Einar Gjerding Diesen was born in Bergen, Norway. He was the son of Thorstein Diesen, who was editor of the newspaper Aftenposten from 1908 to his death in 1925. He attended a boarding school in the United Kingdom before graduating in 1916. He next held an apprenticeship as a journalist at Stavanger Aftenblad. Diesen was a journalist for Aftenposten from 1921. In 1924 he became the foreign correspondent of Aftenposten in Paris and covered the 1924 Winter Olympics in Chamonix. Following the Occupation of Norway by Nazi Germany, Diesen came to Great Britain in the spring of 1942 and was attached to the Government Information Office. From November 1942 to 1945 he worked for the Norwegian government-in-exile in London.

He served as editor-in-chief for Aftenposten from 1948 to 1968. He was chairman of the Norwegian Editorial Society 1956–66, and chairman of the Norwegian Press Association's professional committee 1957–72. Diesen was also an avid tennis player and served as president of the Norwegian Tennis Federation from 1933 to 1948.

== Selected works ==
- Kabalboken (1941)
- Fra petit til leder (1968)
- Heksenes hus (1979)
