= Thoralf Pryser =

Norwegian newspaper editor

- Born: 10 August 1885; Drammen, Norway
- Died: 8 July 1970 (aged 84)
- Occupations: Journalist; Newspaper editor
- Known for: Chairman of the Norwegian Press Association
- Awards: Order of the Three Stars; Order of the Lithuanian Grand Duke Gediminas; Order of the White Lion; Order of the Dannebrog; Order of Merit of the Republic of Hungary

Thoralf Pryser (10 August 1885 – 8 July 1970) was a Norwegian journalist and newspaper editor.

== Personal life ==
Pryser was born in Drammen, a son of Gustav Fredrik Pryser and Caroline Johanne Grimlund. He married Laila Meyer in 1912. His wife died in 1944. In 1951 he married Elisabeth Lie. He died in July 1970.

== Career ==
Pryser worked as journalist for Verdens Gang from 1910, for Morgenbladet from 1911, and for Aftenposten from 1913. He was chief editor of the newspaper Morgenposten from 1918 to 1946, except for 1943-1945 when Morgenposten had installed a Nazi editor. He chaired the Norwegian Press Association from 1924 to 1928.

He was decorated Commander of the Order of the Three Stars, Commander of the Order of the Lithuanian Grand Duke Gediminas, Officer of the Order of the White Lion, Knight of the Order of Dannebrog, and received the Order of Merit of the Republic of Hungary.

Media offices
Preceded by Per Wendelbo	Chairman of the Norwegian Press Association; 1924–1928	Succeeded by Knut Domaas
