= Life... But How to Live It? =

Norwegian punk band

Life... But How To Live It?
- Origin: Oslo, Norway
- Genres: Hardcore punk
- Years active: 1988–1994, 2002, 2008
- Labels: Ebullition; X-port Plater; Konkurrel
- Past members: Tom Andreassen; Roger Andreassen; Katja Osvold; Geir Jenssen

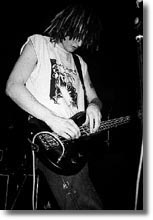
Tom Andreassen - recording a live album

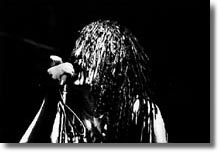
Roger Andreassen - recording a live album

Life... But How to Live It? was a Norwegian band, formed in Oslo in 1988. They played their first show at UFFA, Trondheim October 22, 1988, and their final show at Kampen Verksted, Oslo, April 2, 1994.

== History ==
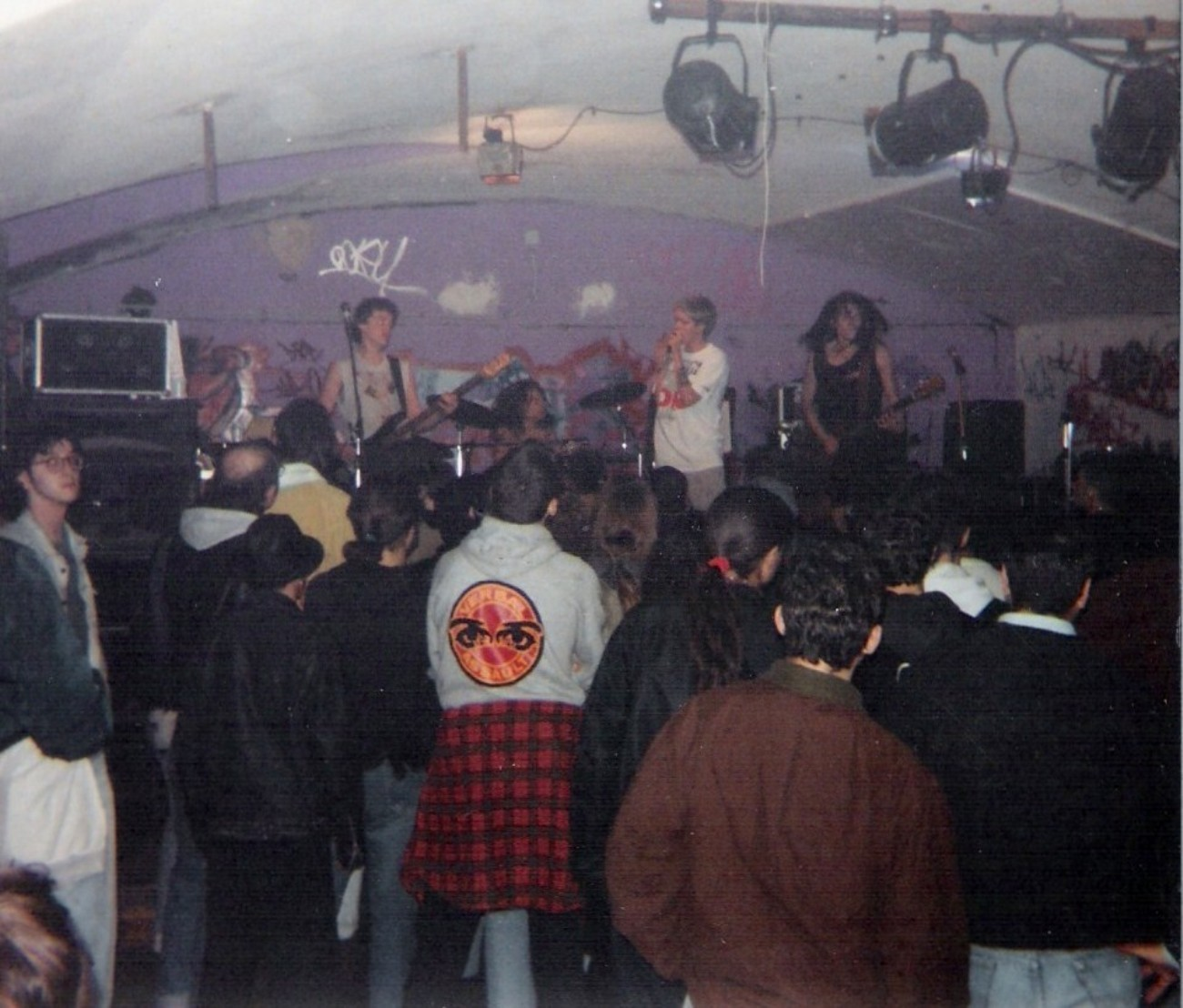
Life... But How to Live It? live in Bologna, Italy – November 11, 1990

The band was formed in summer 1988. The members all frequented Blitz, a squatted building in the middle of Oslo, where many other notable Norwegian hardcore bands such as So Much Hate and Stengte Dører had their base in the late eighties. LBHTLI toured extensively, nearly 300 concerts in fifteen countries in the five years they kept together and released a live album on Your Choice Records, produced by Tobby Holzinger. They split up in 1994.

During the live show on October 28, 1989, at Oberhaus in Alzey, Germany, they recorded their live album Your Choice Live Series Vol. 03 and released it the same year. At that show they played together with Verbal Assault. The police tried to stop the show, but the band continued playing and the audience kicked out the police. All this is documented on the live album. The band also performed the songs "Passing Through" and Smash It Up (by The Damned) which were left off this album and appear on the It's Your Choice compilation.

They have reformed to play three concerts since the breakup: once in 2002 celebrating Blitz's 20th anniversary, and twice in 2008.

=== After breakup ===
Andreassen and Andreassen later went on to play with Captain Not Responsible, Drunk and Danger!Man. Dyret also played Captain Not Responsible as well as Mitti Skritti and 2:20. In 2010, Osvold was a founding member of Castro. In 2015, she appeared on episode 3 of Norwegian documentary series Punx.

== Influence ==
Their song "Green" was played on G7 Welcoming Committee's fourth podcast.

== Members ==
- Katja Benneche Osvold – Vocals
- Roger Andreassen – Guitars
- Tom Andreassen - Bass
- Geir Petter "Dyret" (Norwegian for "animal") Jenssen - Drums

== Discography ==
=== Albums ===
- LP - Life, But How To Live It? (X-Port Plater 1989)
- LP - Day By Day (Konkurrel 1990)
- CD/LP - Ugly (Progress Records / RPN Records / Boss Tuneage 1992)

=== Singles ===
- 7" - Green (Beri-Beri Records 1990)
- 7" - Burn (Beri-Beri Records 1991)

=== Live albums ===
- LP - Your Choice Live Series Vol.03 (Your Choice Records 1989)
- CD - This Might Be My Second Last Beer (Zone Productions 1994)

=== Compilations ===
- CD - Green / Burn (Fuck You All Records / Boss Tuneage 1992) (the two 7"s on one CD)
- LP - Life But How To Live It? (Ebullition 1994) (the Green/Burn CD from 1992 on LP.)
- CD - Life, But How To Live It? (Progress Records 1996) The two first LPs on one CD.

=== Featured on ===
- LP - Blitz Hits (Blitz Recordings 1989)
- 10"- It's Your Choice (Your Choice Records 1991). Various songs from the Your Choice Live Series.
- CD - Life Is Change Vol 2 (Beri-Beri Records 1991).
- CD - Subbacultcha
- CD - Svarte Pantere (Sound-track) (Polygram Records 1992).
- CD - Blitz - 10 år på pur faen (Progress Records 1992).
- 7" - Ox EP Free with the German "Ox Fanzine" in 1992.
- CD - Free with Rock Furore (Norwegian Music Magazine, nr 4–1992).
- CD - Planet Progress (Progress Records 1993)
- CD - Progress Yourself (Progress Records 1996)
