= Terje Baalsrud =

Norwegian newspaper editor (1914–2003)

Terje Baalsrud (9 May 1914 – 17 March 2003) was a Norwegian newspaper editor.

He was born in Kristiansand as a son of Andreas Baalsrud (1872–1961) and his wife Christine Andrea Christofersen (1878–1956). He was a first cousin of Jan Baalsrud. He finished his secondary education in Kristiania in 1932, and started as a journalist in Fedrelandslaget's publication ABC. He was promoted to subeditor in 1937, the same year that he took the cand.oecon. degree, and was further promoted to editor-in-chief in 1939. The newspaper went defunct in 1940, but Baalsrud moved on to Tidens Tegn where he was foreign affairs editor until that newspaper's demise in 1941. He was given the Defence Medal 1940–1945 for resistance during the German occupation of Norway.

Except for a short time as secretary in the Norwegian Forest Owners Association, he worked in the news agency Press Telegraph from 1941 to 1947, and then worked two years as an encyclopedia editor. In 1949 he was hired in the newspaper Norges Handels- og Sjøfartstidende (now: Dagens Næringsliv). He was one of the early muckraker journalists, and gained fame when he discovered a secret weapons sale from Norway to Fulgencio Batista. Baalsrud won the Narvesen Prize in 1959 for this discovery. Later he helped dig up the Kings Bay Affair. His main interests were foreign affairs in general, especially the Baltic countries, as well as defence policy. He was active in Norges Forsvarsforening.

He became acting editor-in-chief of Norges Handels- og Sjøfartstidende in 1961, and then served as chief editor from 1962 to 1978. Baalsrud continued writing after his official retirement, and released several books, among others for the Institutt for Forsvarsopplysning.

Baalsrud held the Order of the Estonian National Council and was a Commander of the Order of the Lion of Finland. In 1938, he was married to Ellen Miøen Ellen Miøen (1913–2002), He died in March 2003 in Oslo.

Awards
Preceded by Henry Imsland	Recipient of the Narvesen Prize; 1959	Succeeded by P. Chr. Andersen; Henning Sinding-Larsen
Media offices
Preceded by Eivind Thon	Chief editor of Dagens Næringsliv; 1961–1978	Succeeded by Helge Seip
