= Andreas Baalsrud =

Norwegian civil engineer (1872–1961)

Andreas Baalsrud (5 March 1872 – 23 January 1961) was a Norwegian civil engineer.

He was born at Stavern in Vestfold, Norway. He took his education at the Christiania Technical School and Zurich Polytechnicum. He was hired by the Norwegian Public Roads Administration in 1891, and worked as district engineer in Vest-Agder from 1912 to 1919. From 1919 to 1945 he served as director of the Norwegian Directorate of Public Roads. Baalsrud married to Christine Andrea Christofersen (1878–1956). They were the parents of newspaper editor Terje Baalsrud (1914-2003).

Government offices
Preceded by Johan Kristian Skougaard	Director of the Norwegian Directorate of Public Roads; 1919–1945	Succeeded by Arne Olai Korsbrekke
Non-profit organization positions
Preceded by Bjarne Nissen	Chairman of the Norwegian Polytechnic Society; 1926–1929	Succeeded by Peter Meinich
