= Olav Scheflo =

Norwegian Communist politician (1883–1943)

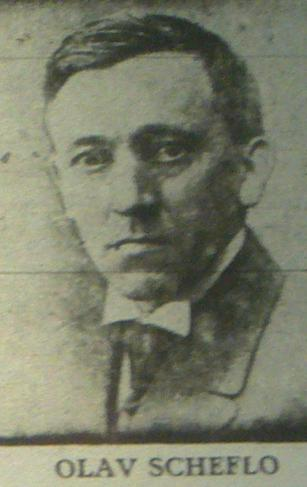
Scheflo

Olav Andreas Scheflo (9 September 1883 – 25 June 1943) was a Norwegian Communist politician and journalist.

== Party activities ==
Scheflo was a member of the Norwegian Labour Party from 1905. After the October Revolution he fought hard to convince the Labor Party to join the Communist International and Scheflo was a Norwegian representative at the second congress of the Comintern in 1920 and was member of the Comintern Executive Committee from 1921 to 1927. Critical towards Stalinism, he left the Norwegian Communist Party in 1928 and rejoined the Labor Party in 1929.

When Sweden's Communist leader, Zeth Höglund was offered to be made honorable corporal in the Red Army in 1918 but declined, the offer instead went to Scheflo, who gladly accepted the position.

When Leon Trotsky lived in exile in Norway in 1935 and 1936, Scheflo strongly defended him against attacks from both Stalinist and the Norwegian bourgeoisie. However, he would never become a real Trotskyist since he was closer to the Soviet Right Opposition.

Scheflo's autobiography is Den røde tråd i Norges historie (The Red Thread in Norwegian History).

== After the split in the party ==
With the party split of 1923, he sided with the Norwegian Communist Party (NKP) in which he was voted into party leadership as a Comintern representative (until 1927) and editor of the main organ of the party, Norges Kommunistblad. In 1924 he was sent to prison for publishing a statement against strikebreaking during the great Iron strike (a series of labor conflicts from 1923–24). That same year, he was condemned for “encouragement of punishable deeds” after having agitated for a military strike.

Politically, Scheflo was relatively moderate and was counted among the right wing in the NKP. The conflict within the party led to his resignation as editor of the main organ in 1927.

In March 1928 Scheflo left the NKP in protest against the party’s negative attitude towards the Hornsrud government. From 1929 he was a member of the Norwegian Labor Party and from 1931 he was the editor of the party newspaper Sørlandet in Kristiansand.
