= Gerd Benneche =

Norwegian politician

Gerd Benneche (1 December 1913 – 26 March 2003) was a Norwegian jurist, journalist, non-fiction writer and politician for the Liberal Party.

== Biography ==
Benneche was born in Bergen, and is the mother of Sissel Benneche Osvold. She worked for the newspaper Dagbladet from 1959 to 1980. In 1974 she was awarded the Narvesen Prize. She headed the Norwegian Press Association from 1975 to 1979. She served as a deputy representative to the Parliament of Norway from Oslo during the term 1958–1961.

She was a member of the Norwegian UNESCO commission, a board member of Riksteatret and the Norwegian Data Inspectorate where she served as deputy chair from 1986 to 1990.
