= Morgenavisen =

Norwegian daily newspaper

- Type: newspaper
- Founded: 1902
- Political alignment: Free-minded Liberal Party and Conservative (Unknown–1930); Free-minded Liberal Party (1930–1936)
- Language: Norwegian
- Headquarters: Bergen

Morgenavisen is a former Norwegian daily newspaper, published in Bergen, Norway from 1902 to 1984. Its first editor was Anders Stilloff, who edited the newspaper from 1902 to 1915.

From its establishment the newspaper was a supporter of businessman and politician Christian Michelsen, and eventually also a supporter for his new political party, the Liberal Left Party. Later the newspaper became a supporter for the Conservative Party. During World War II Morgenavisen had installed a Nazi editor. From 1942 Morgenavisen and Bergens Tidende were the only two remaining newspapers in Bergen, as Bergens Aftenblad and Dagen ceased publication. Three other major newspapers published in Bergen, Gula Tidend, Arbeidet and Bergens Arbeiderblad, had stopped earlier in the war. Gula Tidend stopped its publication already on 10 April 1940. The Communist newspaper Arbeidet was forbidden from August 1940, and Bergens Arbeiderblad was forbidden from 4 January 1941.

In 1945 the newspaper bought Bergens Aftenblad. In 1977 Morgenavisen was the largest newspaper supporting the Conservative Party in Western Norway, with a circulation of around 11,000. The newspaper presented a petition for compulsory winding-up in February 1984, after a failed fund-raising effort.
