= Fædrelandsvennen =

Regional newspaper based in Kristiansand, Norway

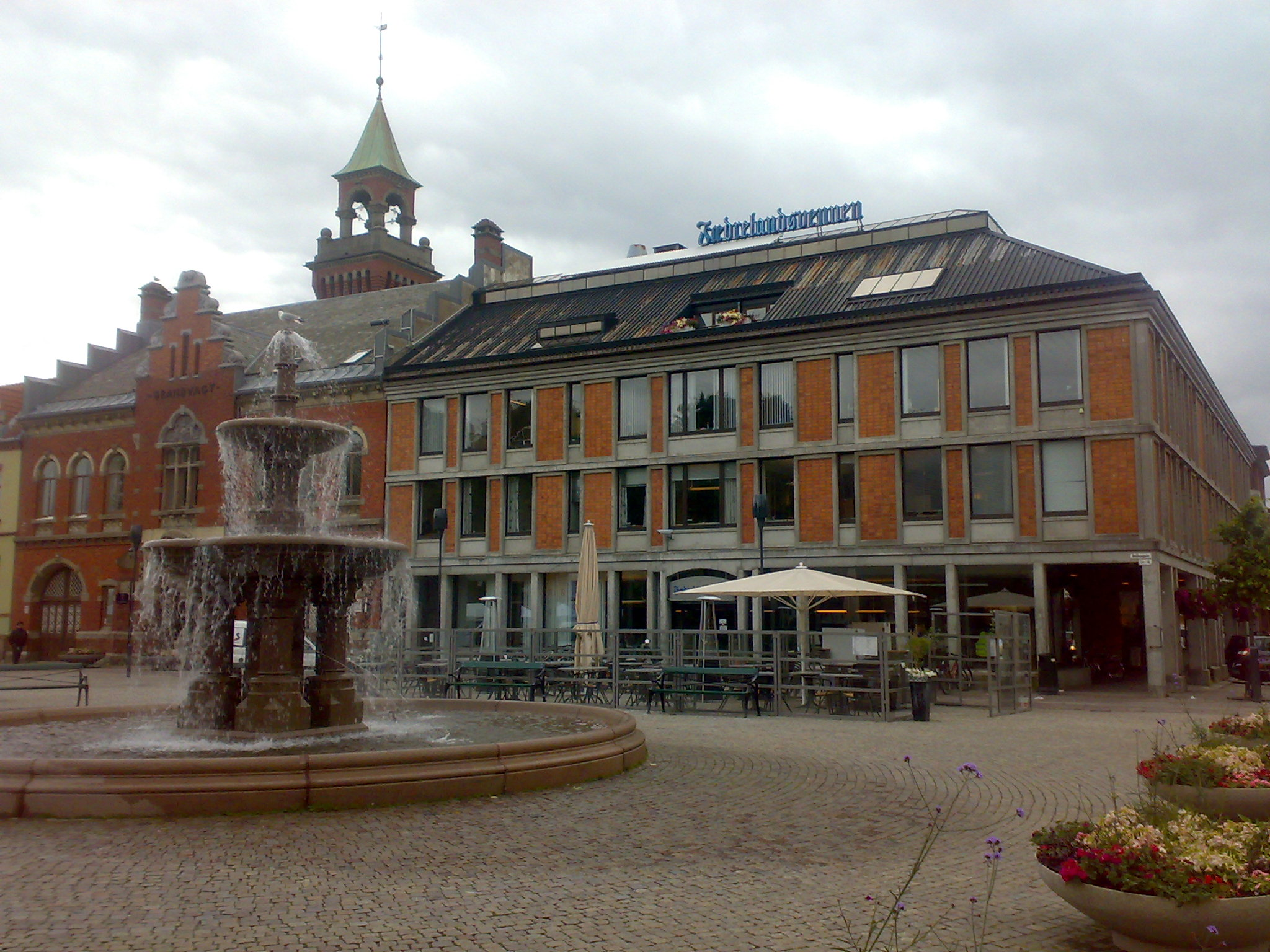
- Type: Daily except sundays (6 days a week newspaper)
- Format: Tabloid
- Owner: Schibsted ASA
- Editor: Eivind Ljøstad
- Founded: 1875; 151 years ago
- Political alignment: Liberal
- Language: Norwegian
- Headquarters: Kristiansand, Norway
- Website: www.fvn.no

Fædrelandsvennen is a regional newspaper based in Kristiansand, Norway. It covers the southernmost part of the country, (Agder county), focusing especially on the area between the towns of Mandal and Lillesand (west and east of Kristiansand).

== History and profile ==
Fædrelandsvennen was established by Petrus Emilius Johanssen and Ole Christian Tangen in 1875. It is owned by the Norwegian based Schibsted ASA and has its headquarters in Kristiansand. Eivind Ljøstad was appointed editor-in-chief of the paper in 2010.

It was Fædrelandsvennen which first reported on 29 December 1999 the relationship of Crown Prince of Norway with his future wife, Mette-Marit.

On 16 September 2006 Fædrelandsvennen was switched from broadsheet to tabloid format. On 14 May 2012, the newspaper introduced paid content for their online site—only subscribers can access the online newspaper in full.

== Circulation ==
Fædrelandsvennen has 235 employees and has 116,000 daily readers. It is published six days per week. The circulation of Fædrelandsvennen was 45,000 copies in 2003. Confirmed circulation figures by Mediebedriftenes Landsforening (Newspaper Publishers' Association), Norway:

- 2006: 42,642
- 2007: 41,326
- 2008: 40,729
- 2009: 39,454
- 2010: 37,934
- 2012: 35,441
- 2014: 34,065
- 2015: 32,739
