= Karl Meyer (businessman) =

Norwegian businessman (1888–1971)

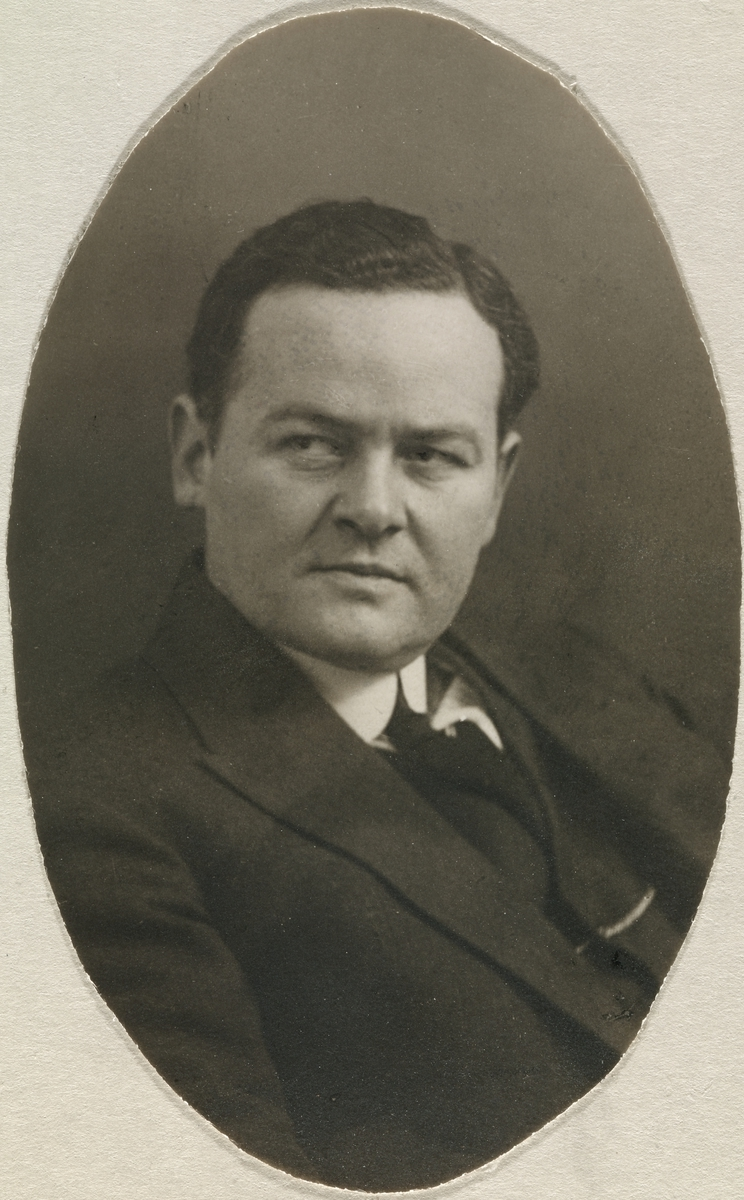
- Born: February 26, 1888; Kristiania, Norway
- Died: December 18, 1971 (aged 83); London, England
- Occupations: Businessman, stockbroker, politician
- Known for: Founder of the National Legion
- Political party: National Legion
- Relatives: Ludvig Meyer (father); Haakon Meyer (brother); Eli Krog (sister)

Karl Meyer (1888 – 18 December 1971) was a Norwegian businessman, stockbroker and founder of the short-lived fascist party, the National Legion.

He had a history of several big fraud cases against him, although he was acquitted from at least one tax evasion case. His proposed business projects, described in the press as "fantastical", included a "Coney Island"-style amusement park at Hovedøya, and turning the steam-liner RMS Carmania into a "floating tenement" at the Oslo harbour.

In 1927 Meyer founded the fascist party the National Legion. The party's activities mainly included Meyer's rousing speeches at a circus, Cirkus Verdensteatret in Oslo, and at Drammens Theater in Drammen. After increasing internal opposition, Meyer was expelled from the party in early 1928. He unsuccessfully attempted to regain control of the party in February, when along with some co-conspirators he went to action against the party's offices with clubs and revolvers. Meyer and two other men were arrested in the incident. The party quickly fell apart amid internal conflicts, and was dissolved in early 1928. In 1934, he was sentenced to one year in prsion for embezzlement.

Karl Meyer was a son of Ludvig Meyer and a brother of Haakon Meyer.
