= National Legion (Norway) =

National Legion Den Nationale Legion
- Leader: Karl Meyer
- Founded: 1927
- Dissolved: 1928
- Newspaper: Nationalfascisten
- Ideology: Fascism
- Political position: Far-right

The National Legion (Norwegian: Den nasjonale legion, archaic Norwegian: Den Nationale Legion) was a short-lived fascist political party in Norway led by Karl Meyer, in existence from 1927–28, notable for being the first fascist party in the country.

== History ==
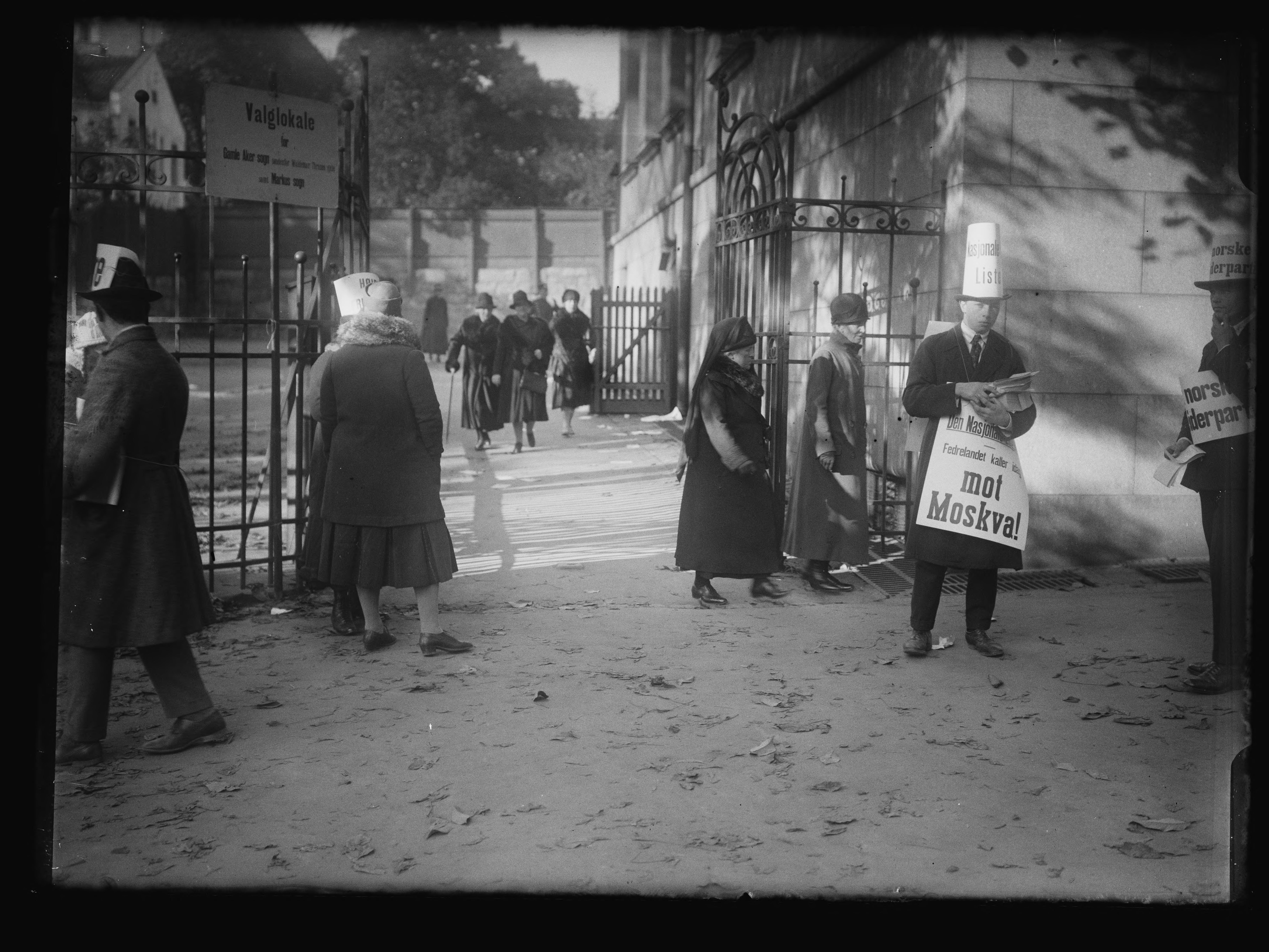
Demonstrators during the 1927 election. The second to right individual on the is a member of the National Legion.

The party was founded at a public meeting at a circus, Cirkus Verdensteatret, in Oslo in May 1927. The event was hosted by the party's leader, Karl Meyer, "Norway's strongest man", a businessman and stock trader with a history of fraud cases. Author and social commentator Erling Winsnes was another leading figure.

Influenced by Italian Fascism, Meyer sought a "March on Oslo", with a parade of "100.000 farmers" that would make "the walls of Jericho crumble". The party however failed to mobilise much beyond Oslo's bourgeois West End. It ran a list in Oslo for the 1927 parliamentary election, but did not win any representation with 1,210 votes, about 1% of the vote in Oslo and 0.1% nationwide. Besides meetings at the circus, the party had little impact, and was dissolved in early 1928 amid internal conflicts and public brawls.
