= Amandus Schibsted =

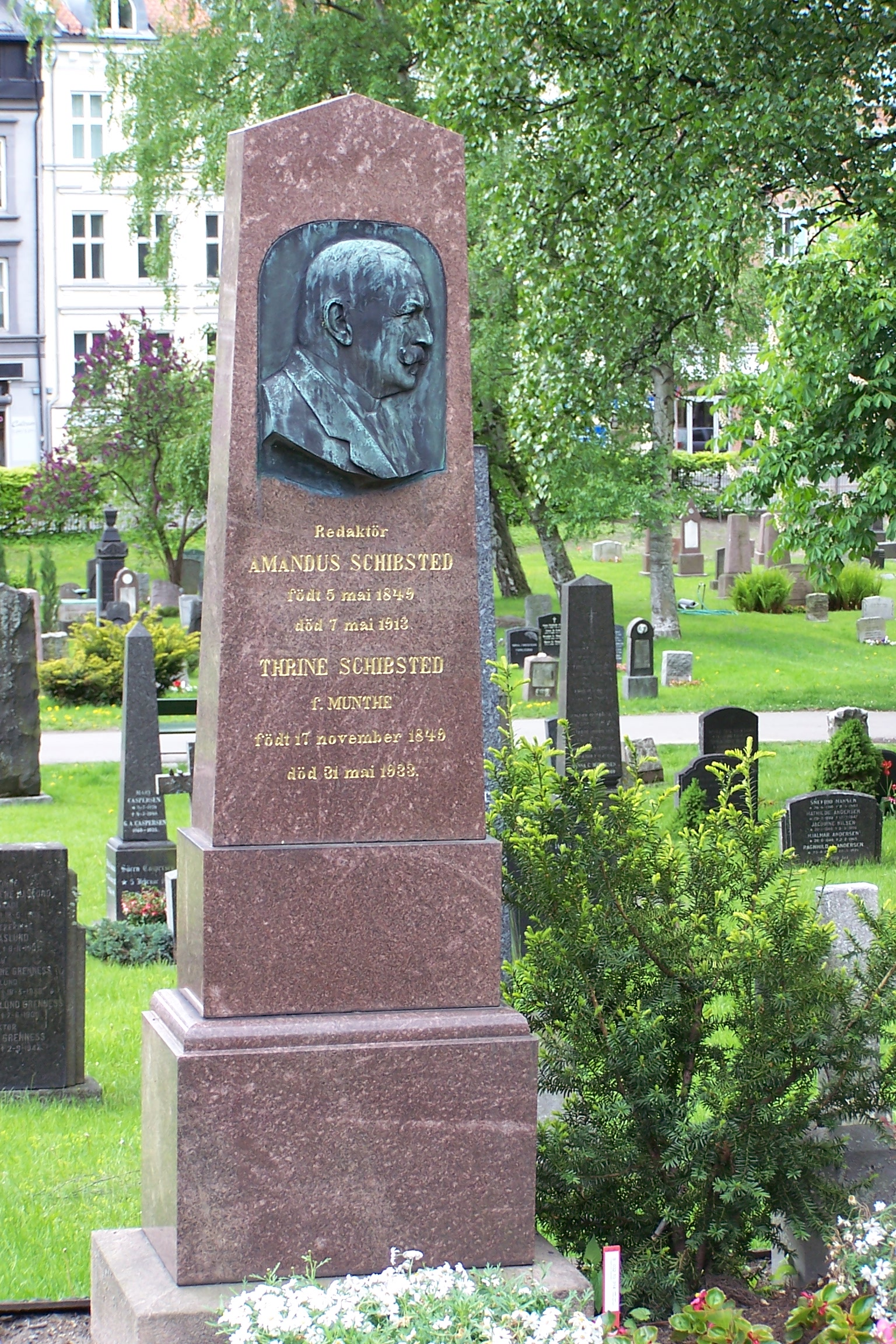
Amandus Schibsted's grave

Amandus Theodor Schibsted (5 May 1849 in Oslo – 7 May 1913) was the owner and chief editor of Aftenposten. He inherited the newspaper from his father, Christian Schibsted, in 1879, but worked as a journalist in the same newspaper from 1871. During his leadership, the news paper developed to be Norway's leading and most widespread conservative daily. He gained distinction through well-organised, quick and reliable news service.

When Amandus died in 1913, his wife Susane Adolphine Cathrine Schibsted (1849–1933) took over the ownership of the newspaper.

Amandus Schibsted is buried at Vår Frelsers gravlund in Oslo.
