= Mejdell =

Mejdell is a surname. Notable people with the surname include:

- Dag Mejdell (born 1957), Norwegian businessperson and chief executive officer of Posten Norge
- Glør Thorvald Mejdell (1851–1937), Norwegian barrister, judge, and political writer
- Johan Ernst Mejdell (1773–?), Norwegian jurist and politician
- Nicolai Mejdell (1822–1899), Norwegian mining engineer
- Peter Ludwig Mejdell Sylow (1832–1918), Norwegian mathematician
- Thorvald Mejdell (1824–1908), Norwegian forester
- Vilhelm Mejdell (1904–1989), Norwegian marketing agent and sports official

== See also ==
- Mijdel
