= Kirsten Sinding-Larsen =

Norwegian architect (1898–1978)

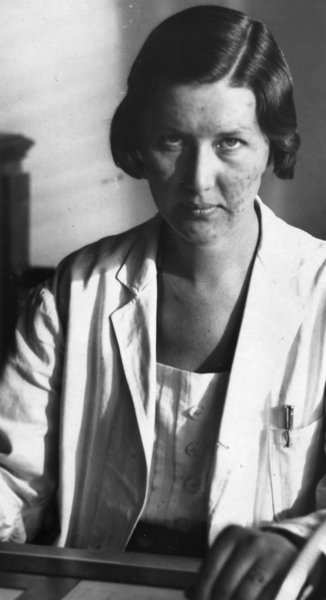
Kirsten Sinding-Larsen

Kirsten Sinding-Larsen (4 August 1898 – 10 December 1978) was a Norwegian architect.

== Early life and education ==
Kirsten Sinding-Larsen was born on 4 August 1898 in Kristiania (now Oslo), Norway, daughter of Emilie Rustad (1871–1904) and colonel Birger Fredrik Sinding-Larsen (1867–1941). Her paternal grandfather was jurist and writer Alfred Sinding-Larsen, and her paternal uncles were physician Christian Magnus Sinding-Larsen, architect Holger Sinding-Larsen and painter Kristofer Sinding-Larsen. She was a first cousin of journalist Henning Sinding-Larsen and her paternal grand uncle was architect Balthazar Lange.

She finished her secondary education in 1912, and studied at the Norwegian National Academy of Craft and Art Industry (now Oslo National Academy of the Arts) from 1915 to 1917.

== Career ==
Sinding-Larsen worked as an apprentice to architect Sigurd Lunde in Bergen from 1919 to 1921. She worked with architect Håkon Ahlberg in Stockholm from 1923 to 1925 and Tage William-Olsson to 1927. She studied architecture at the Royal Institute of Technology from 1927 to 1929. She was employed by architects Gustav Classon and Wolter Gahn in Stockholm from 1929 to 1932. She returned to Oslo in 1932 and worked for a short time with her uncle architect Holger Sinding-Larsen before establishing her own practice in 1933.

During the period 1933–38, she designed a number of homes in Moss and Jeløy in Østfold. Her most notable single work was the design of Sunnaas Hospital at Nesodden in the mid-1950s. She is also remembered as a debater of housing policy.

Kirsten Sinding-Larsen died on 10 December 1978.
