= List of compositions by Christian Sinding =

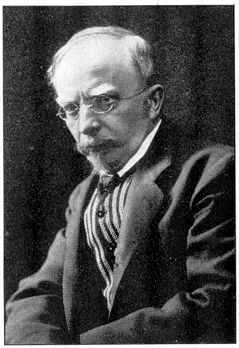
Christian Sinding

This is a list of compositions by Christian Sinding.

== Piano ==
=== Piano solo ===
- Suite for piano, Op. 3
  1. Préamble
  2. Courante
  3. Sarabande
  4. Gavotte
  5. Presto
- Etude, Op. 7
- Skizze, Op. 20
- Fünf Stücke, Op. 24
- Sieben Stücke, Op. 25
- Sechs Stücke, Op. 31
- Sechs Stücke, Op. 32
  1. Marche Grotesque
  2. Mélodie
  3. Frühlingsrauschen
  4. Im Volkston
  5. Rondoletto giocoso
  6. Gobelin
- Serenade, Op. 33, No. 4
- Scherzo, Op.33, No. 6
- Sechs CharakterStücke, Op 34
  1. Prelude
  2. Ondes sonores
  3. Caprice
  4. Crépuscule
  5. Chanson
  6. Rhapsodie guerrière
- 15 Caprices, Op. 44
- Six Burlesques, Op. 48
- Melodies Mignonnes, Op. 52
- Quatre Morceaux Caractéristiques, Op. 53
- Quatre Morceaux de Salon, Op. 54
- Cinq Études, Op. 58
- Fünf Stücke, Op. 62
- Acht Intermezzi, Op. 65
- Acht Intermezzi, Op. 72
- Sechs Stücke, Op. 74
- Mélodie, Op. 76
- Zehn Studien und Skizzen, Op. 82
- Quatre Morceaux, Op. 84
- Sieben Stücke, Op. 86
- Drei Stücke, Op. 88
- Piano Sonata in B minor, Op. 91
- Quatre Miniatures, Op. 93
- Fatum, Op. 94
- Fünf Klavierstücke, Op. 97
  1. Des Morgens
  2. Auf Dem Wasser
  3. Intermezzo
  4. Gewitter
  5. Aquarell
- Tonbilder, Op. 103
  1. Frühlingswetter
  2. Reigen
  3. Scherzando
  4. Silhouette
  5. Stimmung
- Zehn Jugendbilder, Op. 110
- Fünf Stücke, Op. 113
- Sechs Stücke, Op. 115
- Drei Intermezzi, Op. 116
- Fantaisies, Op. 118
- Am Spinett, Op. 122
- Drei Stücke, Op. 125
- Drei Stücke, Op. 127
- Cinq Compositions, Op. 128a
  1. En Avant (Vörwarts)
  2. Etude
  3. Humoreske
  4. Mélodie
  5. A la Marcia
- Serenade
- Irrlicht
- Alla Marchia
- Pompose
- Piano Sonata in F minor (1879, destroyed)

=== Piano, four hands ===
- Suite for piano 4 hands in F major, Op. 35a
- Waltzes for piano 4 hands in G major (1st version), Op. 59, No. 3
- Waltzes for piano 4 hands in G major (2nd version), Op. 59, No. 3
- Waltzes for piano 4 hands in E minor, Op. 59, No. 4
- Acht Stücke for piano 4 hands, Op. 71
- Nordische Tänze und Weisen for piano 4 hands, Op. 98

=== Two pianos ===
- Variations for two pianos in E♭ major, Op. 2
- Andante for two pianos, Op. 41, No. 1

== Instrument solo ==
- Suite in D minor for violin solo, Op. 123

== Chamber music ==
=== Violin and piano ===
- Romance in e minor for violin and piano, Op. 9
- Suite ‘Im alten Stil’ for violin and piano, Op. 10
- Violin Sonata in C major, Op. 12
- Suite in F major, Op. 14
- Violin Sonata in E major, Op. 27
- Romance in e minor for violin and piano, Op. 30
- Prélude for violin and piano, Op. 43, No. 3
- Scènes de la Vie for violin and piano, Op. 51
- Elegy for violin and piano, Op. 61, No. 2
- Ballade for violin and piano, Op. 61, No. 3
- Violin Sonata in F major, Op. 73
- Cantus doloris (Mourning Song) for violin and piano, Op. 78
- Romance in F major for violin and piano, Op. 79, No. 1
- Romance for violin and piano, Op. 79, No. 2
- Air for violin and piano, Op. 81, No. 1
- Ständchen for violin and piano, Op. 89, No. 1
- Abendlied for violin and piano, Op. 89, No. 3
- Suite in G minor for violin and piano, Op. 96
- Violin Sonata ‘Im alten Stil’ in D minor, Op. 99
- Romance for violin and piano, Op. 100
- Elegy for violin and piano, Op. 106, No. 1
- Berceuse for violin and piano, Op. 106, No. 2
- Andante religioso for violin and piano, Op. 106, No. 3
- Drei Präludien for violin and piano, Op. 112
- Drei Capricci for violin and piano, Op. 114
- Abendstimmung, Op. 120a
- Violin Sonata in A major
- Violin Sonata in G major

=== Cello and piano ===
- Sechs Stücke for cello and piano, Op. 66
- Nordische Ballade for cello and piano, Op. 105

=== Piano trio ===
- Piano Trio No. 1 in D major, Op. 23
- Piano Trio No. 2 in A minor, Op. 64, dedicated to The Dutch Trio
- Piano Trio No. 3 in C major, Op. 87

=== Piano quartet ===
- Piano Quartet

=== Piano quintet ===
- Piano Quintet in E minor, Op. 5

=== String quartet ===
- String Quartet in A minor, Op. 70
- String Quartet

=== Other ===
- Serenade for 2 violins and piano, Op. 56, No. 1
- Serenade for 2 violins and piano, Op. 92, No. 2

== Organ ==
- Hymnus, Op. 124

== Orchestral ==
=== Symphonies ===
- Symphony No. 1 in D minor, Op. 21 (1890)
- Symphony No. 2 in D major, Op. 83 (1902)
- Symphony No. 3 in F major, Op. 121 (1920)
- Symphony No. 4, rhapsody for orchestra (‘Frost and Spring’), Op. 129 (1936)

=== Piano and orchestra ===
- Piano Concerto in D♭ major, Op. 6 (1889)

=== Violin and orchestra ===
- Suite in A minor, "Im alten Stil", for violin and orchestra, Op. 10 (1891)
- Violin Concerto No. 1 in A major, Op. 45 (1989)
- Legende in B major for violin and orchestra, Op. 46 (1900)
- Violin Concerto No. 2 in D major, Op. 60 (1901)
- Romance in D major for violin and orchestra, Op. 100 (1910)
- Violin Concerto No. 3 in A minor, Op. 119 (1917)
- Abendstimmung for violin and orchestra, Op. 120a (1915)

=== Other ===
- Frühlingsrauschen, Op. 32 (1896)
- Episodes Chevaleresques, Op. 35b (1897)
- Rondo Infinito for orchestra, after Holger Drachmann, Op. 42 (1898)
- Feststimmung in Skorpen, Op. 120b (1920)
- Overture for orchestra

== Opera ==
- Der heilige Berg (The Holy Mountain), Opera in 3 acts on a libretto by Dora Duncker, Op. 111 (1912)

== Choral music ==
- Til Molde, Op. 16 – cantata for mixed choir, orchestra, and baritone solo.
- Fire Sange, Op. 47
- Mannamaal, Op. 67
- Kantate ved Hundreaarsfesten i det Kongelige Selskab for Norges Ve, Op. 102
- Zwei Lieder, Op. 104
- Vier Lieder, Op. 108
- Jubilæumskantate, Op. 117
- Carmen Nuptiale
- Kantate ved Abeljubilæet

== Lieder ==
- Alte Weisen, Op. 1
- Ranker og Roser, Op. 4
- Tekster, Op. 8
- Sechs Lieder und Gesänge, Op. 11
- Ti Digte af 'Sangenes Bog', Op. 13
- Maria Gnadenmutter (Mary Mother of Mercy), Op. 15, No. 1
- Rosmarin, Op. 15, No. 2
- Es starben zwei Schwestern (Two sisters Died), Op. 15, No. 3
- Die Bettelfrau singt (The Beggar Woman Sings), Op. 15, No. 4
- Wiegenlied (Lullaby), Op. 15, No. 5
- Fem Sange, Op. 17
- Seks Sange, Op. 18
- Fem Sange, Op. 19
- Galmandssange, Op. 22
- Zehn Lieder aus Winternächte, Op. 26
- Symra, Op. 28
- Rytmeskvulp, Op. 29
- Fra Vår til Høst, Op. 36
- Tonar, Op. 37
- Bersøglis og Andre Viser, Op. 38
- Fire Gamle Danske Romanser, Op. 39
- Strengjeleik, Op. 40
- 14 Danske Viser og Sange, Op. 50
- Sylvelin og Andre Viser, Op. 55
- Nemt, Frouwe, Disen Kranz, Op. 57
- Fünf Duette, Op. 63
- Roland zu Bremen, Op. 64b
- Fire Songar, Op. 68
- Fem Songar, Op. 69
- Symra, Op. 75
- Sieben Gedichte, Op. 77
- Inga, Op. 80, No. 4
- No dalar Soli (Now the Sun is Sinking), Op. 80, No. 5
- Kvælden (Evening), Op. 80, No. 7
- Gedichte, Op. 85
- Nyinger, Op. 90
- Tre Blomstersange, Op. 95
- Vier Gedichte, Op. 101
- Vier Balladen und Lieder, Op. 107
- Vier Balladen und Lieder, Op. 109
- A Cradle Song, Op. 126, No. 1
- Barcarole, Op. 128, No. 4
- Farvel (Farewell), Op. 130, No. 2
- Spring Day
- Narcissus
- Amber: Rav
- Little Kirsten
- A Bird Cried
- It Is a Summer Evening as Before
- Sylvelin
- The Maiden In the Poppy Field
- There Once Was a Little Hen
- Poppy in the Field
- Mother of God, Exalted, Mild
- A Frightened Bird Flies from the Grove
- The Stars Shine So Red
- The Dark Wine
- In Forest Lies a Calm Lake
- Mary, Mother of Mercy
- Many Dreams
- A Woman
- Boat-Song
- How the Bright Moon Shines
- My Eyes Shine
- Little Rose Bit into the Apple
- I Fear No Ghosts
- All My Wisdom
- Song of a Little Sunshine
- The Arabian Tale of Antar and Abla (Sange af den Arabiske fortoelling Antar og Abla): Stridssang (Battle Hymn)
- The Arabian Tale of Antar and Abla (Sange af den Arabiske fortoelling Antar og Abla), for voice & piano: Kjærlighetssang (Love Song)
- Sulamith's Sang
- To Sange
- Bondesang
- Et Efterår
- End Er Jeg Stemt
- Til Edvard og Nina Grieg
- Mot
- Perler
- Die heiligen drei Könige
- The New Moon
