= Uranienborg =

Uranienborg may refer to:

- Uraniborg or Uranienborg, the astronomical/astrological observatory of Tycho Brahe on the island of Ven
- Uranienborg, Norway
- Uranienborg Church
- Uranienborg-Majorstuen, a Norwegian borough that was merged into Frogner
