= Christian Magnus Sinding-Larsen =

Norwegian physician and hospital director (1866–1930)

Christian Magnus Falsen Sinding-Larsen (17 April 1866 – 12 February 1930) was a Norwegian physician and hospital director.

== Personal life ==
He was born in Kristiania as a son of jurist and writer Alfred Sinding-Larsen (1839–1911) and Elisabeth Lange (1841–1887). He was a brother of colonel Birger Fredrik Sinding-Larsen, architect Holger Sinding-Larsen and painter Kristofer Sinding-Larsen, and also a grandnephew of mining engineer Matthias Wilhelm Sinding, second cousin of painter Sigmund Sinding, maternal great-grandson of founding father Christian Magnus Falsen and nephew of Balthazar Lange.

In April 1897 in Kristiania he married Lilla Kildal (born 1875), daughter of Birger Kildal. He was an uncle of architect Knut Martens Sinding-Larsen, architect Kirsten Sinding-Larsen and journalist Henning Sinding-Larsen.

== Career ==
He finished his secondary education in 1855, then graduated with the cand.med. degree in medicine in 1891. He worked one year at Rikshospitalet, and in 1892 he was hired at Kysthospitalet in Fredriksvern. In 1907 he took the dr.med. degree with the German-language thesis Beitrag zum Studium der Behandlung der Hüftgelenktuberkulose im Kindesalter. In 1911 he was appointed as director of Rikshospitalet. He continued his research and publication, especially on tuberculosis of the joints. He was also responsible for building and expansion projects at the hospital.

He was vice president of the Norwegian Red Cross from 1917 to 1922. In 1926 he released a 100th-year-anniversary history of Rikshospitalet, entitled Rikshospitalets første hundrede aar. He died in 1930 from heart failure during a debate in the Norwegian Medical Society. A bust of him was made by Trygve Thorsen and raised outside the main gate of Rikshospitalet. The hospital was moved to another location in 2000.
