= Kraggerud =

Kraggerud is a Norwegian surname. Notable people with the surname include:

- Egil Kraggerud (born 1939), Norwegian philologist
- Henning Kraggerud (born 1973), Norwegian musician and composer
