= Kristofer Sinding-Larsen =

Norwegian painter (1873–1948)

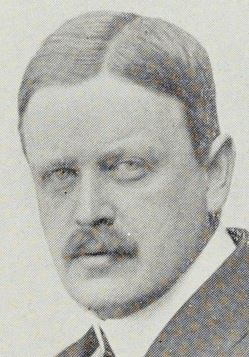
- Born: Kristofer Andreas Lange Sinding-Larsen; 3 April 1873; Oslo, Norway
- Died: 26 December 1948 (aged 75)
- Education: Oslo Cathedral School (1891)
- Occupation: Painter

Kristofer Andreas Lange Sinding-Larsen (3 April 1873 – 26 December 1948) was a Norwegian painter.

== Personal life ==
He was born in Kristiania as a son of jurist and writer Alfred Sinding-Larsen (1839–1911) and Elisabeth Lange (1841–1887). He was a brother of physician Christian Magnus Sinding-Larsen, architect Holger Sinding-Larsen and officer Birger Fredrik Sinding-Larsen, and also a grandnephew of mining engineer Matthias Wilhelm Sinding, second cousin of painter Sigmund Sinding, maternal great-grandson of founding father Christian Magnus Falsen and nephew of Balthazar Lange.

In December 1903 in Helsingør he married Danish citizen Margrethe Volkersen (1880–1951). Their son Henning Sinding-Larsen became a notable journalist. He was also an uncle of architect Knut Martens Sinding-Larsen and architect Kirsten Sinding-Larsen.

== Career ==
He finished his secondary education at Kristiania Cathedral School in 1891. He attended the Norwegian Military Academy from 1892 to 1893, the Royal School of Drawing from 1893 to 1894 and Harriet Backer's School from 1894 to 1895. He then stayed in Italy for three years, and painted his main pieces Appelsintreet and Magna in 1898. He then studied under Peder Severin Krøyer in Copenhagen from 1898 to 1899 and in Seville from 1900 to 1901. He lived in Denmark and Italy until 1921, when his family moved back to Norway. In addition to nature and city landscapes he painted portraits and altarpieces. He contributed to Høstutstillingen between 1898 and 1940, and is represented in the National Gallery of Norway, Oslo City Museum, Bergen Art Museum and Galleria Nazionale d'Arte Moderna.

Like his father before him, Sinding-Larsen was a secretary of Christiania Kunstforening, from 1905 to 1906. He was also chairman of the Association of Norwegian Printmakers from 1930 to 1939 and Norsk Forening for Grafisk Kunst from 1935 to 1947, vice chairman of Kunstnernes Hus from 1930 to 1946 and board member of Bildende Kunstnere from 1909 to 1912. He was decorated with the Order of the Crown of Italy. In 1941 he released the book Norsk grafikk i det tyvende århundre. He died in December 1948 in Oslo.
