= Ernst Anton Henrik Sinding =

Norwegian mathematician

Ernst Anton Henrik Sinding (8 December 1839 – 11 January 1924) was a Norwegian school director.

== Personal life ==
He was born in Larvik as a son of vicar Otto Ludvig Sinding (1809–1890) and Dorothea Magdalene Lammers. He was a brother of Elisabeth Sinding and Gustav Adolf Sinding, a nephew of Gustav Adolph Lammers and Matthias Wilhelm Sinding and a first cousin of Alfred Sinding-Larsen and the three siblings Christian, Otto and Stephan Sinding.

In April 1864 in Kristiania he married Alfhild Bassøe (1846–1919). Through his son Bjarne he was a grandfather of economist and statistician Thomas Sinding.

== Career ==
He finished his secondary education in 1856, and graduated from university with the cand.real. degree in 1863. He worked as a teacher from 1864 to February 1873. He also worked part-time at the Royal Frederick University from 1865 t 1873. From 1873 to 1915 he was the first director of Kristiania Technical School. He also lectured in mathematics. The school was important in educating Norwegian technicians and engineers, before the Norwegian Institute of Technology had been founded (in 1910).

He was also a member of the Patent Commission, and, when it was founded, the Norwegian Industrial Property Office board from 1911 to 1921. He was a member of Kristiania city council from 1885 to 1898, and several governmental commissions. He died in January 1924 in Kristiania.
