= Alfred Sinding-Larsen =

Norwegian civil servant and writer (1839–1911)

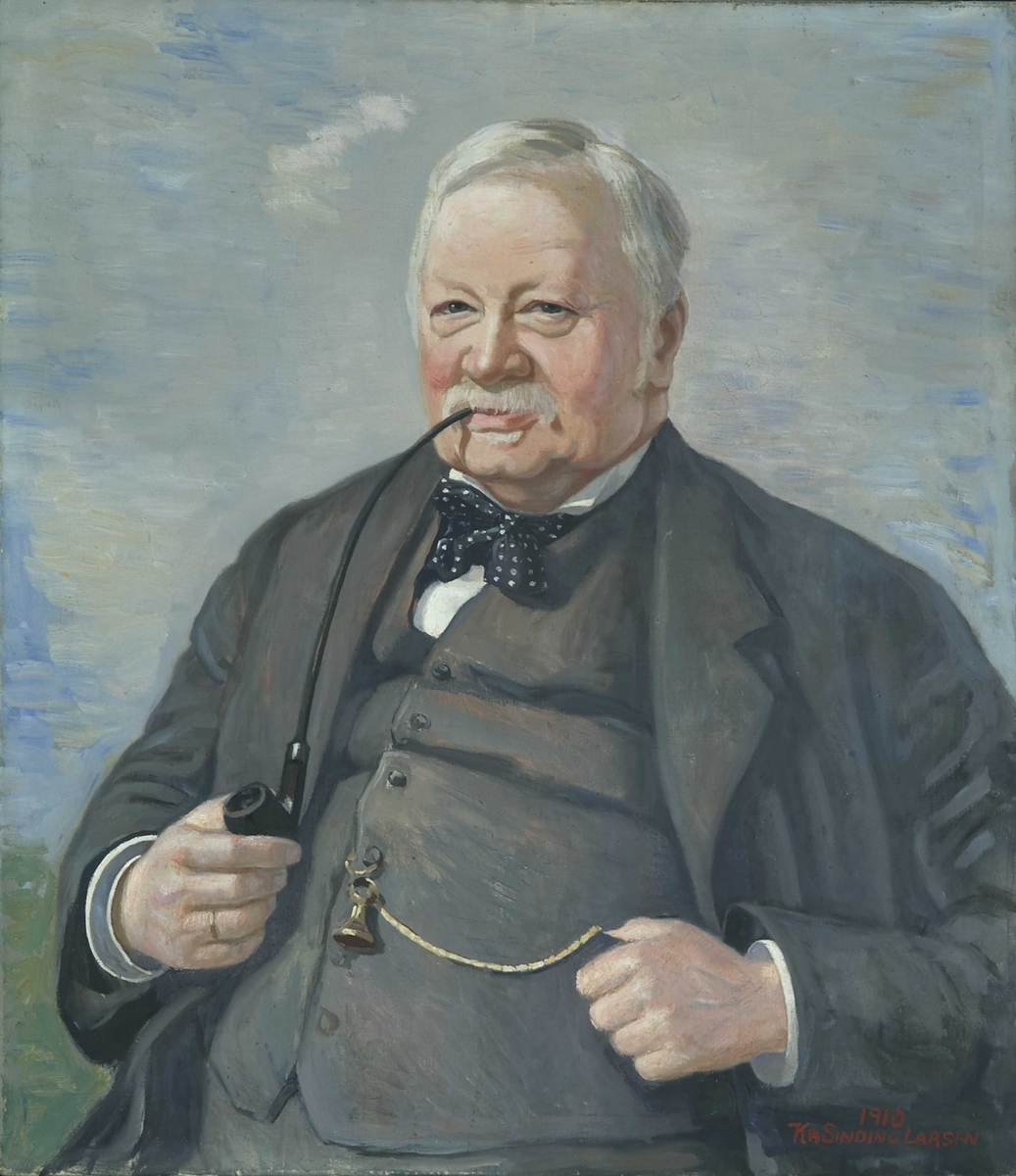
- Portrait of Sinding-Larson by Kristofer Sinding-Larsen, one of his sons
- Born: Nils Ulrik Alfred Sinding-Larsen; 5 June 1839; Fredrikstad, Norway
- Died: January 28, 1911 (aged 71); Oslo, Norway
- Occupations: Civil servant; writer

Nils Ulrik Alfred Sinding-Larsen (5 June 1839 – 28 January 1911) was a Norwegian civil servant, teacher at the Military Academy, journalist and writer.

== Personal life ==
He was born in Fredrikstad as a son of physician Ole Peter Larsen (1808–1876) and Frederikke Hedevig Sinding (1815–1891). He took the name Sinding-Larsen in 1881. He was a nephew of mining engineer Matthias Wilhelm Sinding, and a first cousin of the three siblings Christian, Otto and Stephan Sinding and another three siblings Ernst Anton Henrik Sinding, Elisabeth Sinding and Gustav Adolf Sinding.

In June 1865, in Arendal, he married Elisabeth Lange (1842–1887). She was a sister of Balthazar Lange. They had four notable children; physician Christian Magnus Sinding-Larsen, colonel Birger Fredrik Sinding-Larsen, architect Holger Sinding-Larsen and painter Kristofer Sinding-Larsen. He was a grandfather of architect Knut Martens Sinding-Larsen, architect Kirsten Sinding-Larsen and journalist Henning Sinding-Larsen.

== Career ==
He finished his secondary education in 1855, then graduated with the cand.jur. degree in law in 1863. In his jurist career, he worked in the Ministry of the Army from 1863. In 1877, he became acting auditor for the Norwegian Cavalry and for Akershus garrison. He left these positions in 1901, but also tutored at the Norwegian Military Academy from 1889 to 1905. He was also a secretary for the executive committee of Kristiania city council from 1875 to 31 December 1896. He was also a member and secretary of Christiania Kunstforening.

He also had a career in journalism. His first journalistic piece was printed in Aftenbladet in 1858. He worked for Aftenbladet permanently from 1861 to 1869, when he became sub-editor in Morgenbladet. He held the latter position until his death, and was also an art, theatre and literary critic until 1896. He was also a Kristiania correspondent for Vestlandske Tidende from 1861 to 1864, Drammens Tidende from 1866 to 1870, Dagbladet from 1868 to 1869 and Stockholms Dagblad from 1871 to 1883. He also contributed to other publications such as Christiania Intelligenssedler, Skilling-Magazin, Ny illustreret Tidende and Norsk Folkeblad.

Sinding-Larsen wrote poems in newspapers and for stage performances, and published one poetry collection, For første gang in 1867. Between 1858 and 1873, he also wrote folk songs under the pseudonym Olaves Pedersen. They tell tales of different characters taken from Kristiania city, and he also used the Vika dialect for some of the characters, making the songs linguistically interesting. He was one of the first writers to use a local dialect from Norway's capital. The songs were published in a collected edition in 1903 with a foreword by Johan Storm.

Sinding-Larsen died on 28 January 1911 in Kristiania.
