= Birger Fredrik Sinding-Larsen =

Norwegian military officer (1867–1941)

Birger Fredrik Sinding-Larsen (12 October 1867 – 27 November 1941) was a Norwegian military officer.

== Personal life ==
He was born in Kristiania as a son of jurist and writer Alfred Sinding-Larsen (1839–1911) and Elisabeth Lange (1841–1887). He was a brother of physician Christian Magnus Sinding-Larsen, architect Holger Sinding-Larsen and painter Kristofer Sinding-Larsen, and also a grandnephew of mining engineer Matthias Wilhelm Sinding, second cousin of painter Sigmund Sinding, maternal great-grandson of founding father Christian Magnus Falsen and nephew of Balthazar Lange.

In September 1892 in Kristiania he married Emilie Rustad (1871–1904). They had the daughter Kirsten Sinding-Larsen, a notable architect. He was also an uncle of architect Knut Martens Sinding-Larsen and journalist Henning Sinding-Larsen.

== Career ==
He finished his secondary education in 1885, then enrolled at the Norwegian Military Academy from which he graduated in 1888. He was a second lieutenant in the infantry from 1888, and was promoted to premier lieutenant in January 1889, captain in March 1899 and major in July 1911. In June 1915 he was promoted to lieutenant colonel, and on 1 January 1918 to colonel.

He was an inspection officer at several military schools: 2. Akershusiske Infanteribrigades Underofficersskole from 1894 to 1896 and the Norwegian Military Academy from 1897 to 1899. His father was a teacher at the Military Academy during the same period, from 1889 to 1905. Birger Fredrik Sinding-Larsen was then a teacher at Infanteriets Skyteskole from 1901 to 1910 and director of the school from 1911 to 1917. From 1911 to 1917 he was also editor of the military research journal Norsk Militært Tidsskrift. He was also awarded with the King's Medal of Merit in Gold for making a Festschrift for the Norwegian Military Academy's 150th anniversary in 1900.

He retired from the military in May 1929. He died in November 1941 in Oslo.
