= Stephan Sinding =

Norwegian-Danish sculptor

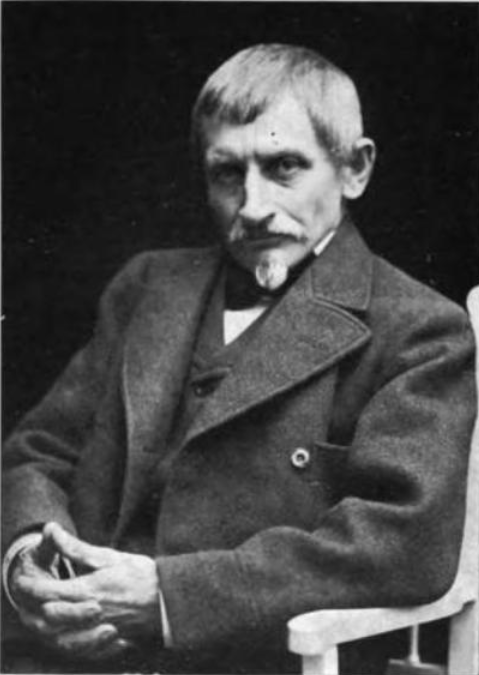
- Born: 4 August 1846; Trondheim, Norway
- Died: 23 January 1922 (aged 75); Paris, France
- Known for: Sculptor
- Notable work: Valkyrie, Copenhagen
- Movement: Realism

Stephan Abel Sinding (4 August 1846 – 23 January 1922) was a Norwegian-Danish sculptor. He moved to Copenhagen in 1883 and had his breakthrough the same year. In 1890 he obtained Danish citizenship. In 1910 he settled in Paris where he lived and worked until his death in 1922.

== Early life and education ==
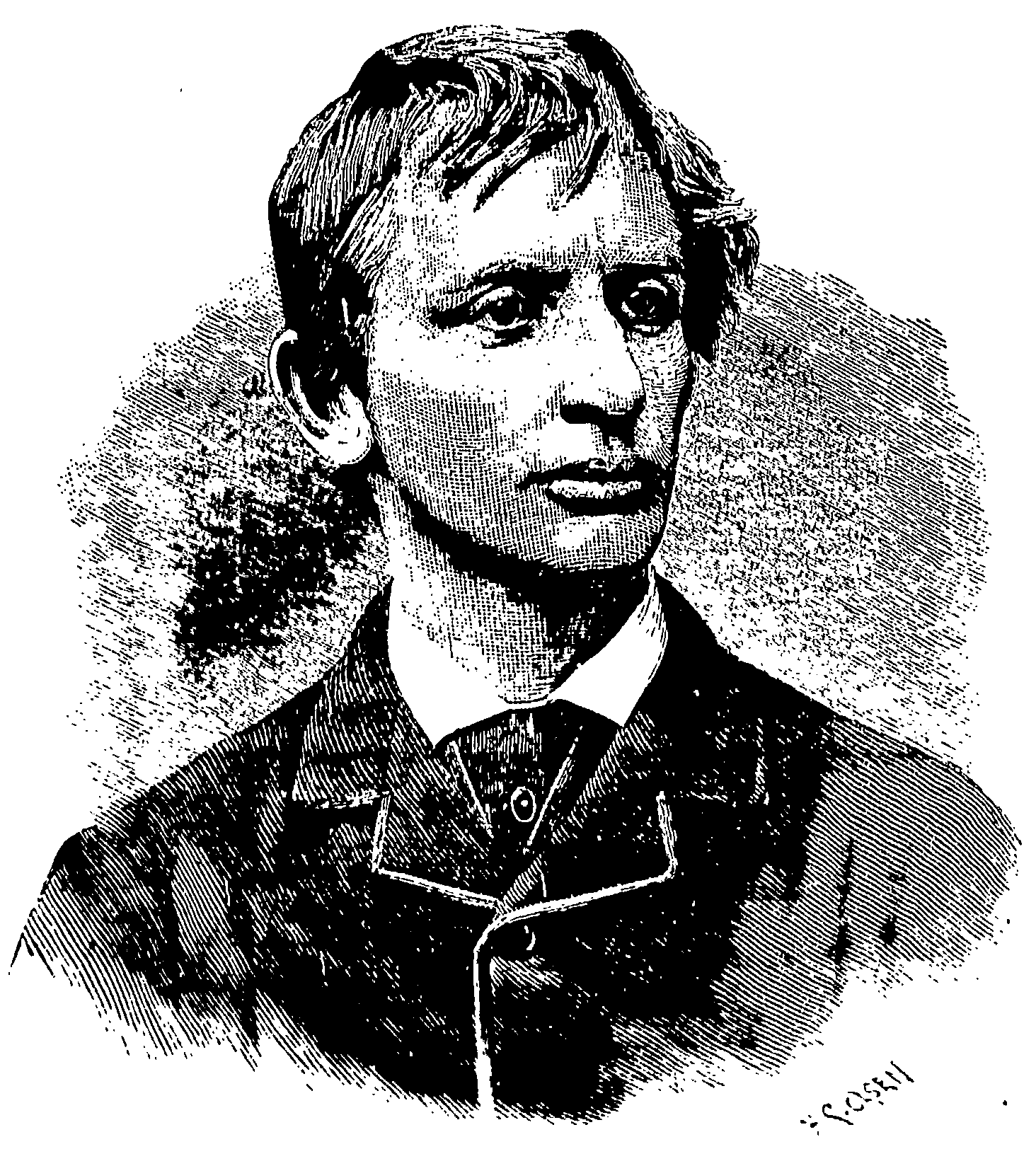
Sinding portrayed by Danish xylographer Hans Christian Olsen shortly after his move to Denmark

Stephan Abel Sinding was born in Trondhjem as a son of mining engineer Matthias Wilhelm Sinding (1811–1860) and Cecilie Marie Mejdell (1817–1886). Sinding was the brother of the composer Christian Sinding and painter Otto Ludvig Sinding and the nephew of Nicolai Mejdell (1822–1899) and Thorvald Mejdell (1824–1908), and through the former a first cousin of Glør Thorvald Mejdell, who married Stephan's sister Thora Cathrine Sinding. Stephan Sinding was also a first cousin of Alfred Sinding-Larsen and the three siblings Ernst Anton Henrik Sinding, Elisabeth Sinding (1846–1930) and Gustav Adolf Sinding (1849–1925).

Sinding first embarked on law studies in Christiania but broke off to instead pursue a career in the arts. He took drawing and modeling classes first at the Royal School of Drawing in Christiania and then studied privately with sculptor Albert Wolff in Berlin. Sinding spent his adult life working in different places mostly Rome, Copenhagen, and finally Paris.

From 1874 to 1875 he studied in Paris and picked up influences from the latest Realist tendencies in French sculptures, especially from Auguste Rodin and Paul Dubois. Sinding was met with poor recognition from the Norwegian public since his style was considered too modern.

== Career in Denmark ==
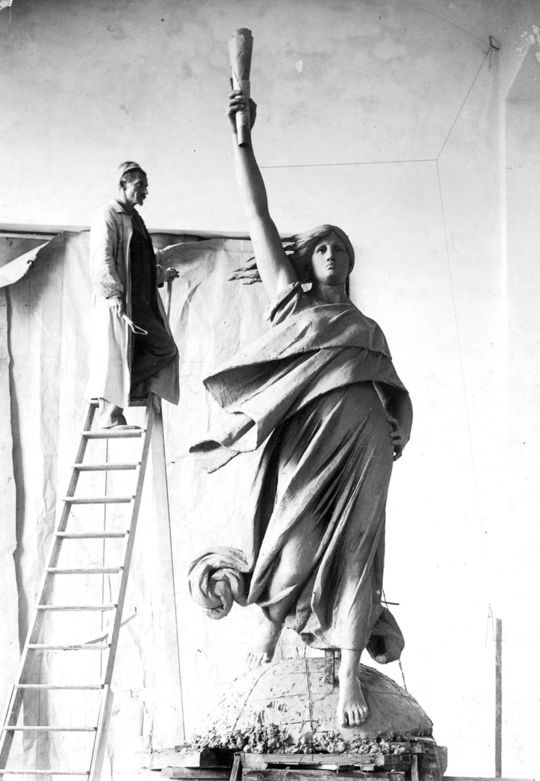
Sinding during work on the sculpture Electra for the new headquarters of the Great Northern Telegraph Company on Kongens Nytorv in Copenhagen, c. 1893

In 1883 he moved to Copenhagen, which he found a better working place, and had his breakthrough with the sculpture A barbarian woman carries her dead son home from the battle, created during a stay in Rome that same year. It was acquired by the brewer Carl Jacobsen, the son and heir of Carlsberg-founder Jacob Christian Jacobsen, who was a great admirer of both classical and modern sculpture and was building an ever-growing private collection which in the end turned into the Ny Carlsberg Glyptotek

Sinding created a number of sculptures, among others Mother in Captivity, which won him the Grand Prix at the Exposition Universelle (1889), Two figures (1889), and Young woman at her husband's body / The Widow (1892). Many of Sinding's sculptures are credited to realism, but together with Danish sculptor Niels Hansen Jacobsen, among others, are by many considered much more in the style of Symbolism. An example of his symbolic work is his sculpture Valkyrjen (the valkyrie), a bronze cast of which stands in Churchill Park in Copenhagen.

Sinding became a titular professor and taught private students in Copenhagen.

== Late years in Paris ==
In 1910 Sinding moved to Paris, where he worked until his death. Assisted by Franz von Jessen, Sinding wrote an autobiography entitled En Billedhuggers Liv (1921). He died in January 1922 in Paris, and was buried at the Père Lachaise Cemetery.

== Private life ==
In May 1885 in Frederiksberg he married actress Anna Elga Augusta Betzonich (1859–1936).

== Selected works ==
- Vølund smed, 1873
- Hylas, ca. 1880
- Slaven, 1878,
- Frise, 1891
- Enken, 1892
- Henrik Ibsen, 1899
- Bjørnstjerne Bjørnson, 1899
- Moder Jord, 1900
- Ole Bull, 1901
- Valkyrjen, 1908
- Angelus, 1913
- L'Offrande, 1918
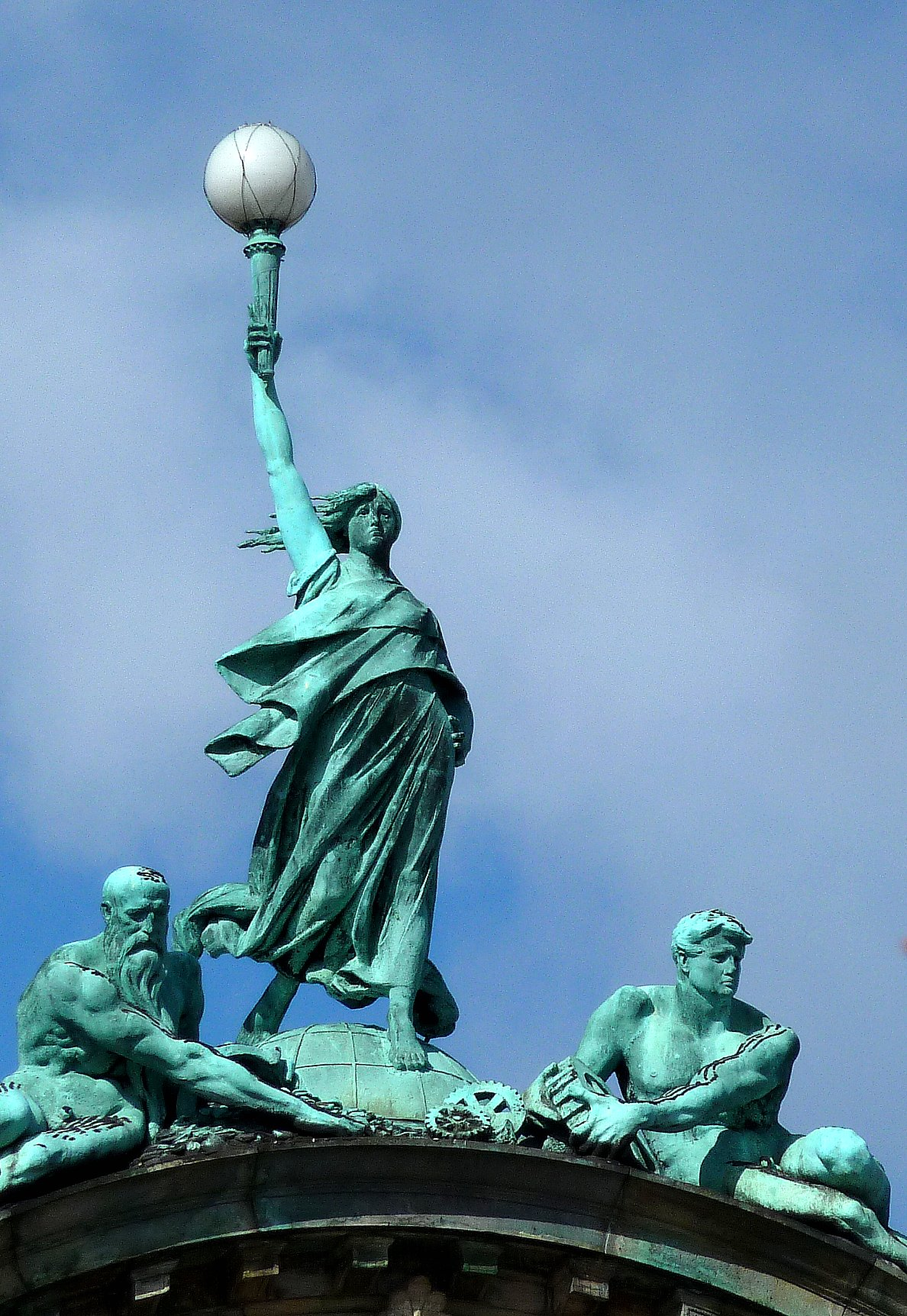
Stephan Sinding's Electra statue at Kongens Nytorv in Copenhagen

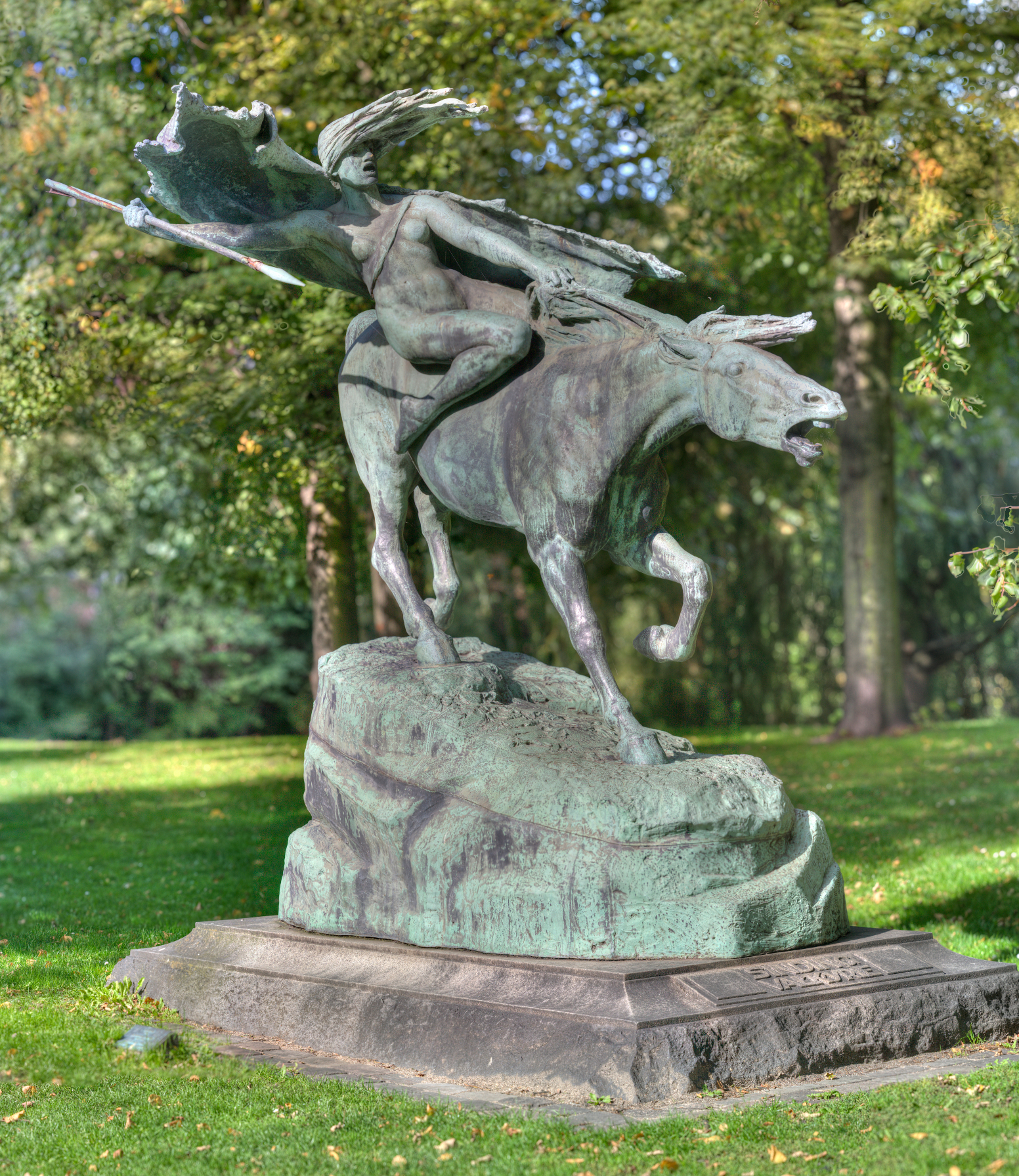
Valkyrjen (1908), Churchill Park, Copenhagen

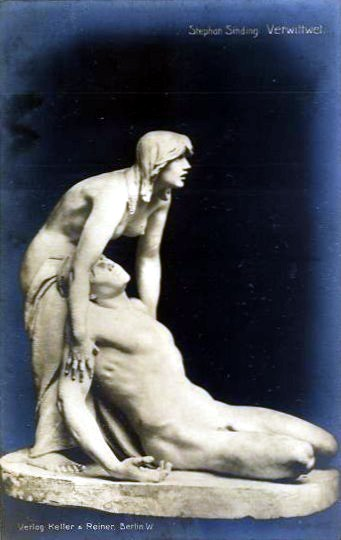
Suddenly a Widow (ca. 1910)
Ny Carlsberg Glyptotek

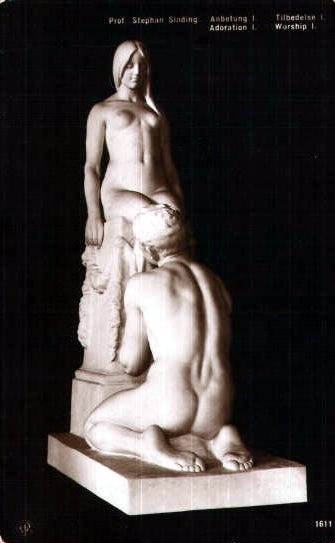
Adoration I (ca. 1910)
Ny Carlsberg Glyptotek

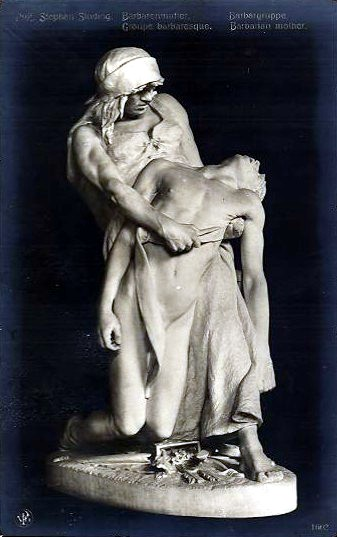
Barbarenmutter (ca. 1910)

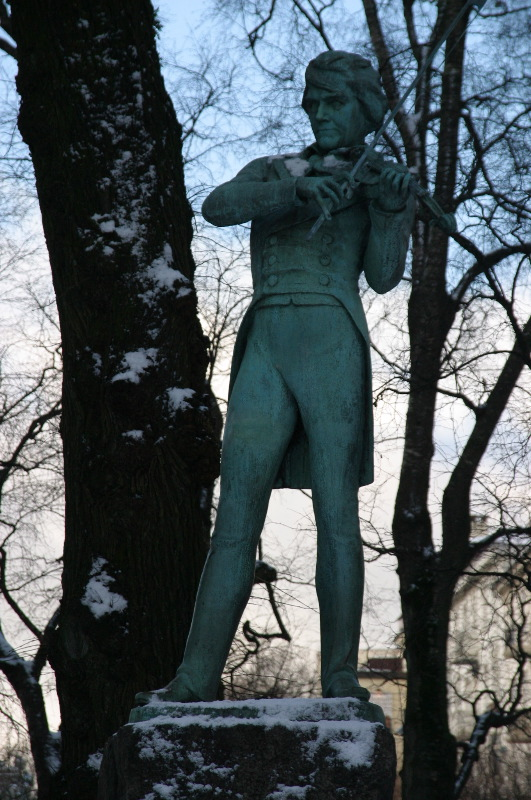
Statue of Ole Bull (1901)
Bergen, Norway

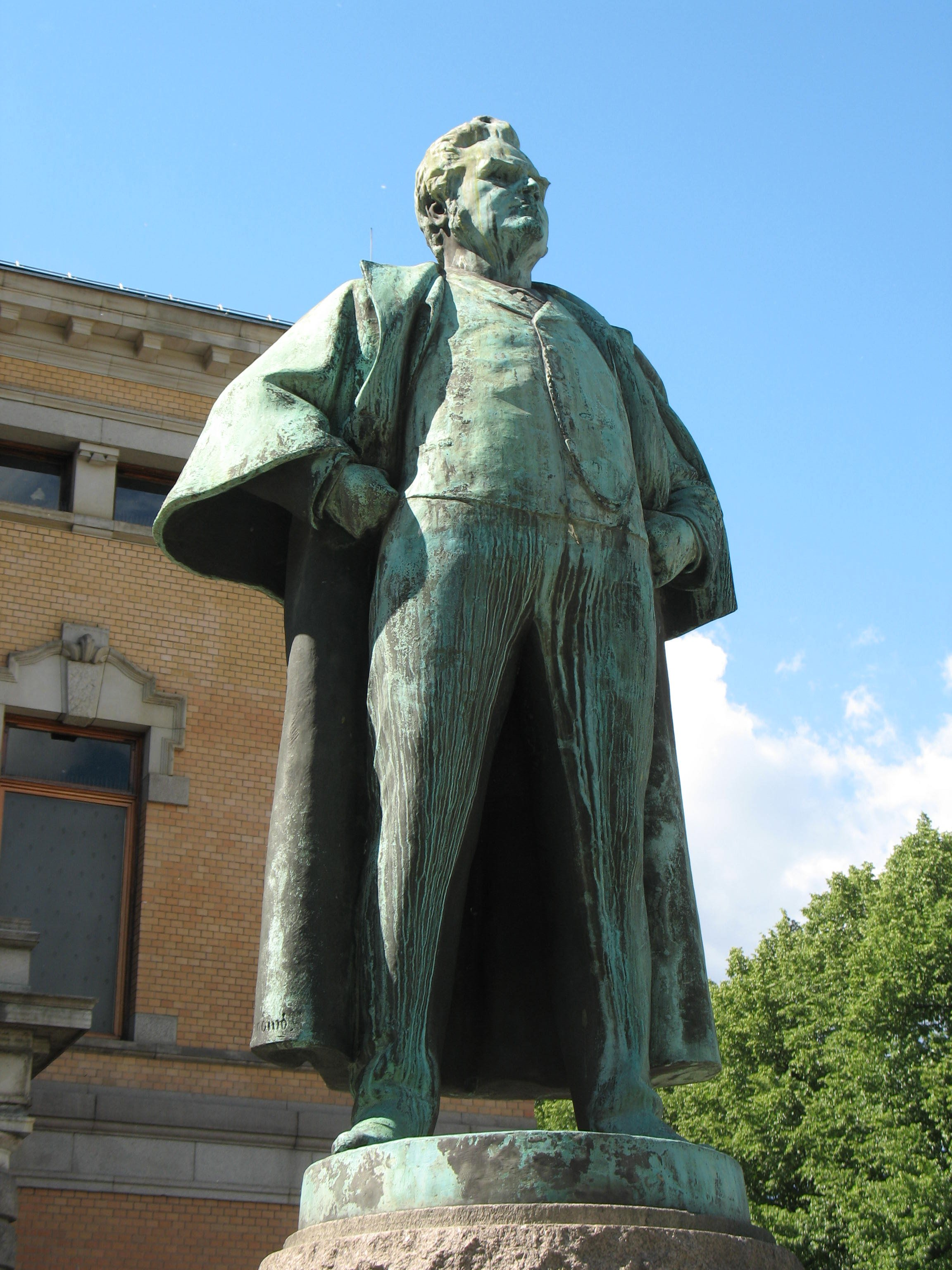
Statue of Bjørnstjerne Bjørnson (1899)
National Theatre, Oslo

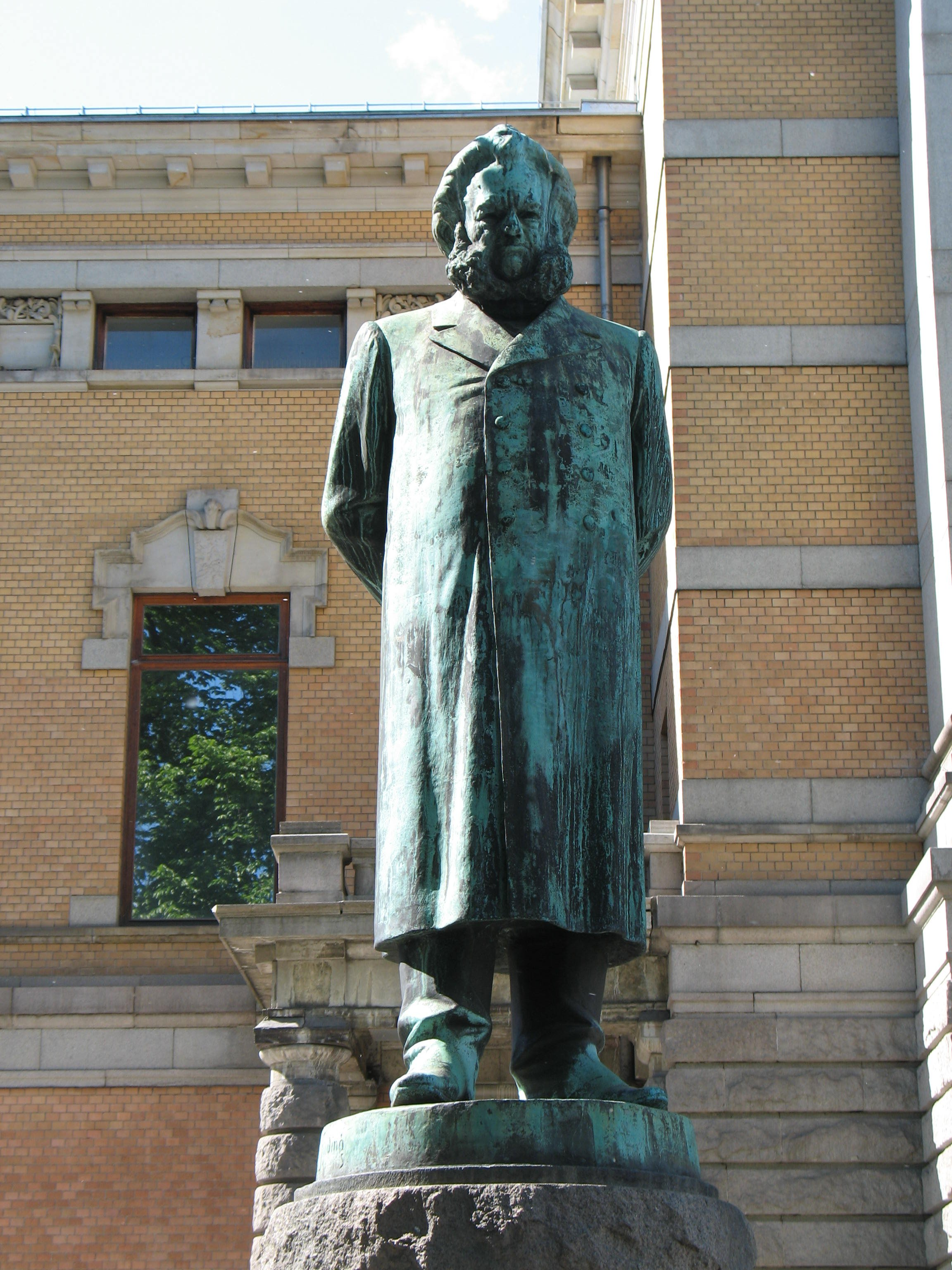
Statue of Henrik Ibsen (1899)
National Theatre, Oslo

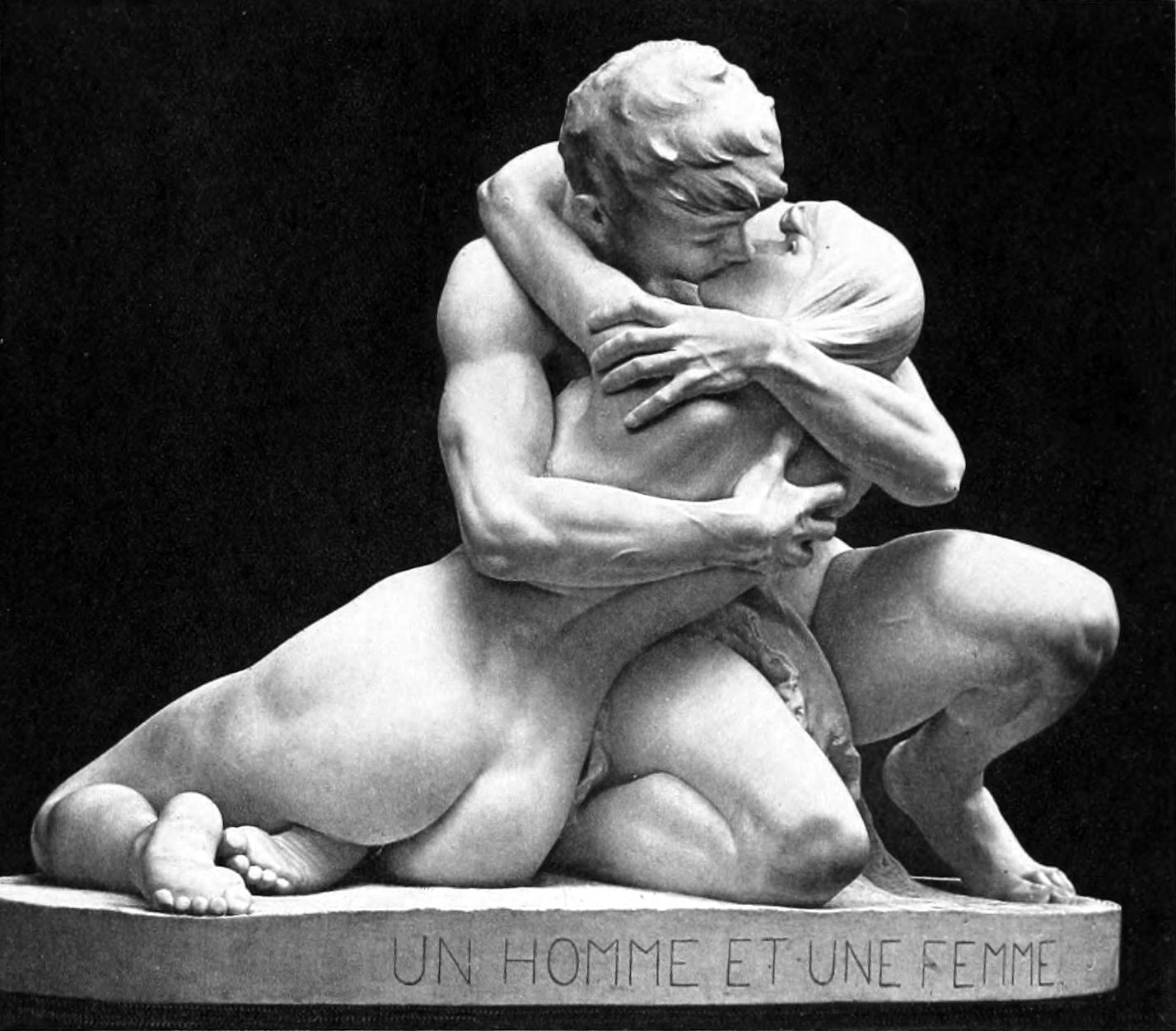
Un homme et une femme

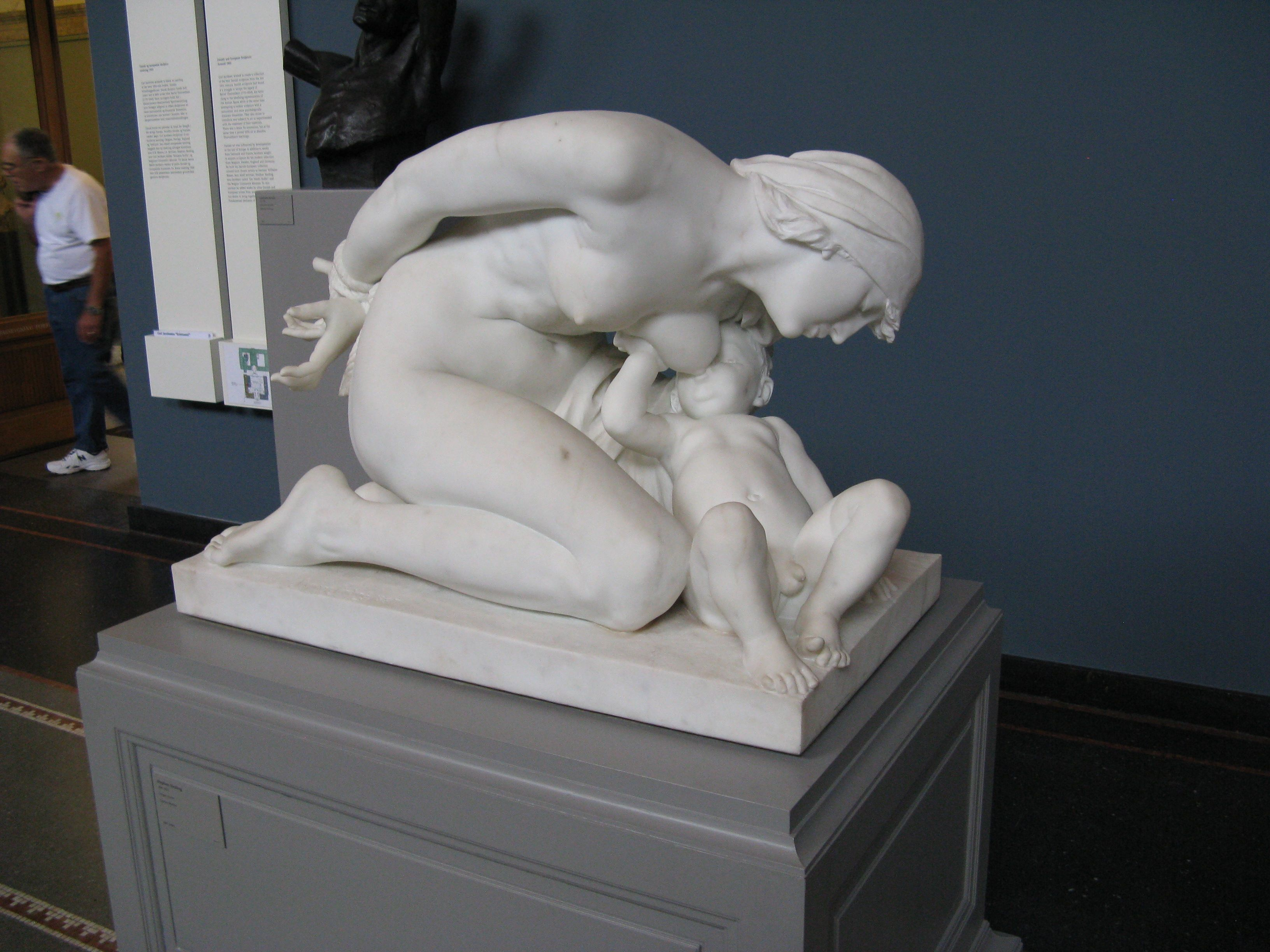
Captive mother
Ny Carlsberg Glyptotek

== Other sources ==
- Grappe, Georges Stephan Sinding (Paris: Librairie Artistique Internationale. 1920)
- Rapsilber, M. Stephen Sinding (Marquardt & Co. 1910)
