= Glør Thorvald Mejdell =

Glør Thorvald Mejdell (29 May 1851 – 24 November 1937) was a Norwegian barrister, judge and political writer.

He was born in Kongsberg as a son of mining engineer Nicolai Mejdell (1822–1899), nephew of forester Thorvald Mejdell and grandnephew of officer Jacob Gerhard Meydell. He finished his secondary education in 1868, took the cand.jur. degree in law in 1871, started a career as a lawyer and in 1878 he became a barrister with access to work with Supreme Court cases. From 1879 he was a partner in the law firm Mejdell & Heyerdahl. He was also a board member in the Auditor-General's office from 1889 to 1903, acting Supreme Court Assessor in 1892, extraordinary Assessor from 1899 to 1909 and ordinary Assessor from 1909 to 1921.

In the 1870s he got a reputation for being "the attorney of lower-class people" (småfolks sakfører). He was a board member of Kristiania Arbeidersamfund from 1876 to 1878, and started the radical weekly magazine For By og Land in 1876. The magazine became defunct the next year. Mejdell wrote for the newspapers Dagbladet and Verdens Gang, but later shifted considerably to the conservative and libertarian side. writing for Aftenposten and Farmand. He was active as a debater in the years around 1884 and the Impeachment case against Selmer's Cabinet. He issued three one-off publications which described his political views: Tro in volumes 1-4 in 1901 and 1902, Politik. Et valgmanifest in 1903 and Fremtiden her i Landet in 1908. Other publications are Tankevirksomhedens Love (1877), Om Grundlovens § 112 (1881) and the English-language Independence (1890), in a language he could write but not speak. His political views and ideas have been extensively outlined in Ulf Torgersen's stencil G. Th. Mejdell. En undersøkelse av liberalistisk elitetro and Jostein Nerbøvik's book Antaparlamentariske straumdrag i Noreg 1905–1914.

Mejdell was married to his first cousin Thora Cathrine Sinding (1850–1932), a daughter of Matthias Wilhelm Sinding and sister of Christian, Otto and Stephan Sinding. He died in November 1937 at Nesodden.
