= Henning Sinding-Larsen =

Norwegian journalist (1904–1994)

Henning Lange Sinding-Larsen (1 November 1904 – 18 November 1994) was a Norwegian journalist.

== Personal life ==
He was born in Asker as a son of painter Kristofer Sinding-Larsen (1873–1948) and Margrethe Volkersen (1880–1951). He was a grandson of Alfred Sinding-Larsen, a nephew of Christian Magnus Sinding-Larsen, Birger Fredrik Sinding-Larsen and Holger Sinding-Larsen, and a first cousin of Knut Martens Sinding-Larsen.

Sinding-Larsen was married three times. From 1930 to 1932 he was married to Gunhild Thalbitzer (1904–1995), daughter of Carl Thalbitzer. From 1934 to 1938 he was married to Vivika Catharina Margareta Ankarcrona (1914–1992). From July 1939 to 1965 he was married to Hilary Yvonne Holme (1918–). In August the same year their daughter Ellen Beate was born. She married Egil Kraggerud and became the mother of Henning Kraggerud.

== Career ==
His family moved a lot during his childhood, but he took the examen artium in 1922 in Kristiania. He also took commerce school. In 1927 he graduated from the university with the law degree. However, he started a career in journalism, and was hired as Copenhagen correspondent for Göteborgs Handels- och Sjöfartstidning in 1929. In 1933 he became Oslo correspondent, and also wrote for Oslo-based newspaper Aftenposten. He soon dedicated his career to Aftenposten, and was its Paris correspondent from 1946 to 1949 and Bonn correspondent from 1950 to 1952. From 1952 to 1953 he was in Zurich. For his coverage of the 1960 Summer Olympics he won the Narvesen Prize. He retired in 1973.

Sinding-Larsen was an active fencer, and also chaired the Norwegian Fencing Federation for some time. He wrote two memoir books; Med pressekort. Reiser og mennesker (1976) and 1001 dag. Erfaringer fra 40 journalistår (1982). He died in November 1994 in Oslo.

Awards
Preceded by Terje Baalsrud	Recipient of the Narvesen Prize; 1960 (shared with P. Chr. Andersen)	Succeeded by Jacob R. Kuhnle
