= Otto Sinding =

Norwegian painter and poet (1842–1909)

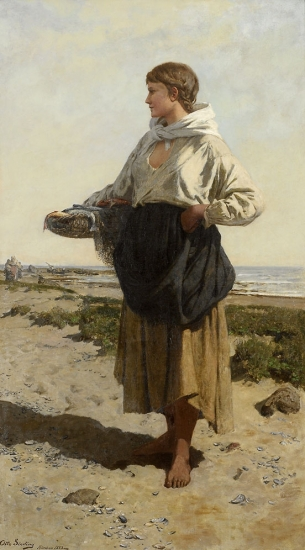
Fiskerjente på strand (1883) Fisherwoman on the coast

Otto Ludvig Sinding (20 December 1842 – 22 November 1909) was a Norwegian painter, illustrator, poet and dramatist. Sinding drew on motives from Norwegian nature, folk life and history.

== Personal life ==
Otto Sinding was born in Kongsberg as a son of mine superintendent Matthias Wilhelm Sinding (1811–1860) and Cecilie Marie Mejdell (1817–86). He was the older brother of the sculptor Stephan Sinding and the composer Christian Sinding. He was a nephew of Nicolai Mejdell (1822–1899) and Thorvald Mejdell (1824–1908), and through the former a first cousin of Glør Thorvald Mejdell, who married Otto's sister Thora Cathrine Sinding. Otto Sinding was also a first cousin of Alfred Sinding-Larsen and the three siblings Ernst Anton Henrik Sinding, Elisabeth Sinding and Gustav Adolf Sinding.

In April 1874 in Karlsruhe Otto Sinding married Anna Christine Nielsen (1855–1914), an adoptive daughter of Hans Gude and Betsy Anker. Their son Sigmund Sinding became a notable painter.

== Career ==
Otto Sinding went to art school in Christiania where he studied law and served as a civil servant. His first attempts at landscape painting earned him a scholarship, with which he went to Karlsruhe in Germany where he continued his studies. He studied art under Hans Gude at the Baden School of Art in Karlsruhe. It was there that Sinding also came into contact with Wilhelm Ludwig Friedrich Riefstahl and Karl Theodor von Piloty.

In 1876 he returned to Norway and then painted the altarpiece of Christ on the cross for Paul's Church in Christiania (Oslo) and several pictures by Norwegian folk tales and dramatic coastlines. In 1880 he made a trip to Italy and then settled in Munich, where he painted a series of animated landscapes and marines. During the winter of 1886, he undertook a study trip to the Lofoten Islands. Some of his best known works would be his landscape paintings from Lofoten. In 1891 he established residence in Lysaker. From 1903 on the artist lived in Munich where he was a professor at the Art Academy of Munich.

He died in Munich in November 1909.

== Other sources ==
- From an article by Frank Jensen about the artists of northern Norway
