= Christiania-Posten =

Norwegian newspaper

Christiania-Posten was a short-lived newspaper in Oslo, Norway.

The paper began publication on 17 May 1848; it was edited by Carl Arntzen and Ludvig Vibe. In 1853 Ludvig Kristensen Daa took over the editorship; the newspaper's political allegiance subsequently changed from conservative to liberal. Upon Daa's 1856 leave the newspaper changed allegiance back and forth several times; it also had changing editors. Nicolai Mejdell became editor in 1855, and Johan Peter Weisse his co-editor in 1858.

In 1863, publication of Christiania-Posten ceased.
