= Nicolai Mejdell =

Norwegian mining engineer (1822–1899)

Christian Henrik Nicolai Mejdell (21 April 1822 – 1899) was a Norwegian mining engineer.

He was born in the prestegjeld of Vang in Hedmark. He took his mining examination in 1843. He worked as manager of Selbu Copper Works and Kongsberg Silver Works, and from 1865 he was the mine superintendent (Norwegian: bergmester) for all of South-Eastern Norway. He was also an editor-in-chief of the newspaper Christiania-Posten, and issued books.

He was a nephew of officer Jacob Gerhard Meydell, brother of forester Thorvald Mejdell and the father of jurist and writer Glør Thorvald Mejdell. Through his sister Cecilie Marie Mejdell he was a brother-in-law of Matthias Wilhelm Sinding and an uncle of Christian, Otto and Stephan Sinding; and also an uncle of Thora Cathrine Sinding who married his son Glør.
