= Balthazar Lange =

Norwegian architect (1854–1937)

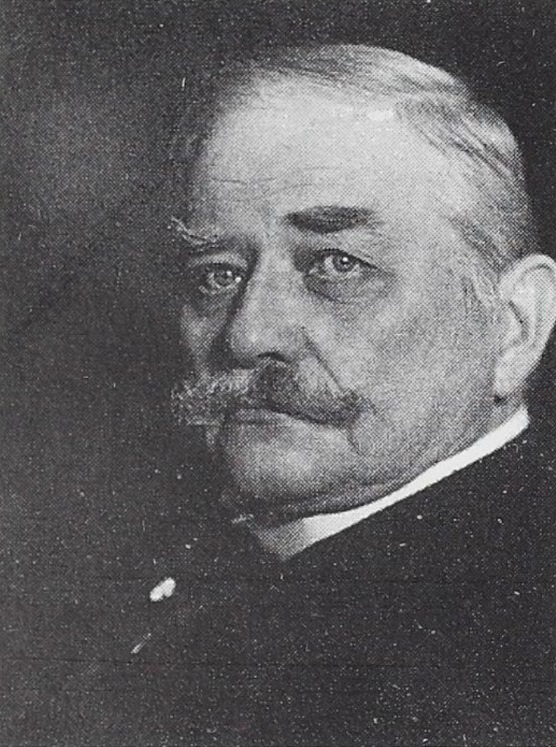
Balthazar Lange

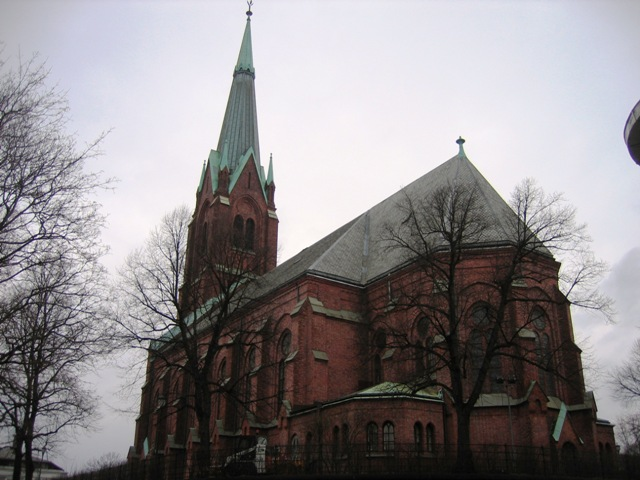
Uranienborg Church, 1880

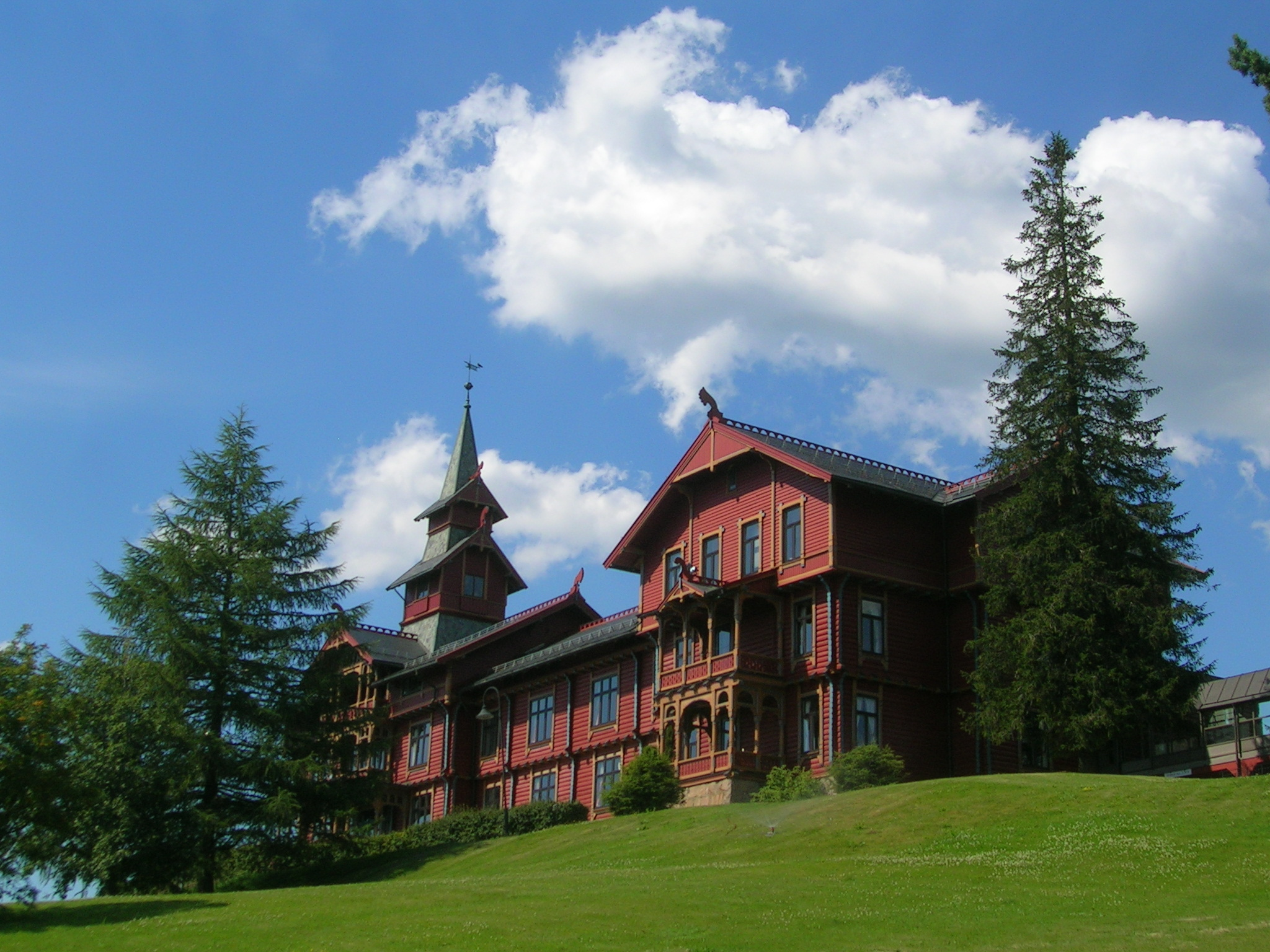
Holmenkollen Park Hotel, 1894

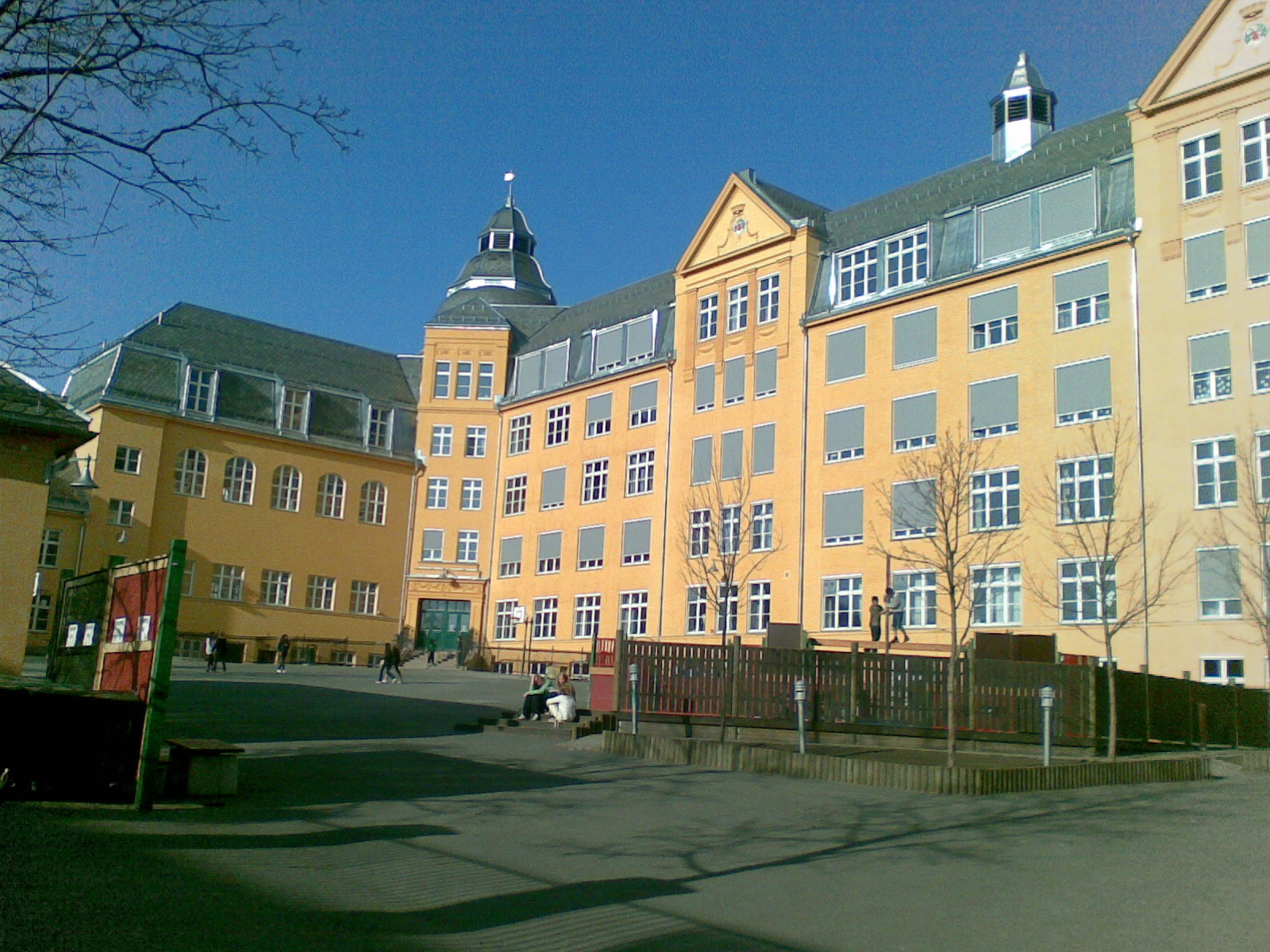
Ila school, 1916

Balthazar Conrad Lange (25 March 1854 - 13 September 1937) was a Norwegian architect.

== Personal life ==
He was born in Asker as a son of customs treasurer and lieutenant colonel Christopher Andreas Lange (1808–1888) and Anne Birgithe Falsen. He was a maternal grandson of founding father Christian Magnus Falsen, grandnephew of Alexander Lange, first cousin of naval officer Christian Magnus Falsen and Conrad Falsen and first cousin once removed of Christian Christoph Andreas Lange and Jacob Otto Lange.

In 1881 in Arendal he married Elise Kløcker (1857–1934). The couple had one daughter and five sons, although not all survived past infancy. His sister Elisabeth Lange married Alfred Sinding-Larsen and had the children Christian Magnus Falsen Sinding-Larsen, Birger Fredrik Sinding-Larsen, Holger Sinding-Larsen and Kristofer Sinding-Larsen.

== Career ==
He first made his mark while working for the Norwegian State Railways from 1878 to 1881. He mainly designed station buildings in Østfold and Vestfold, including Skoppum, Stokke, Sandefjord, and Porsgrunn. He then returned to Kristiania, having already drawn Uranienborg Church in 1880. In 1894, he gained fame for the dragon style sanatorium at Holmenkollen sanatorium (today known as Holmenkollen Park Hotel). As city architect from 1898 to 1920, he also drew several schools.
