= Trygve Thorsen =

Norwegian sculptor

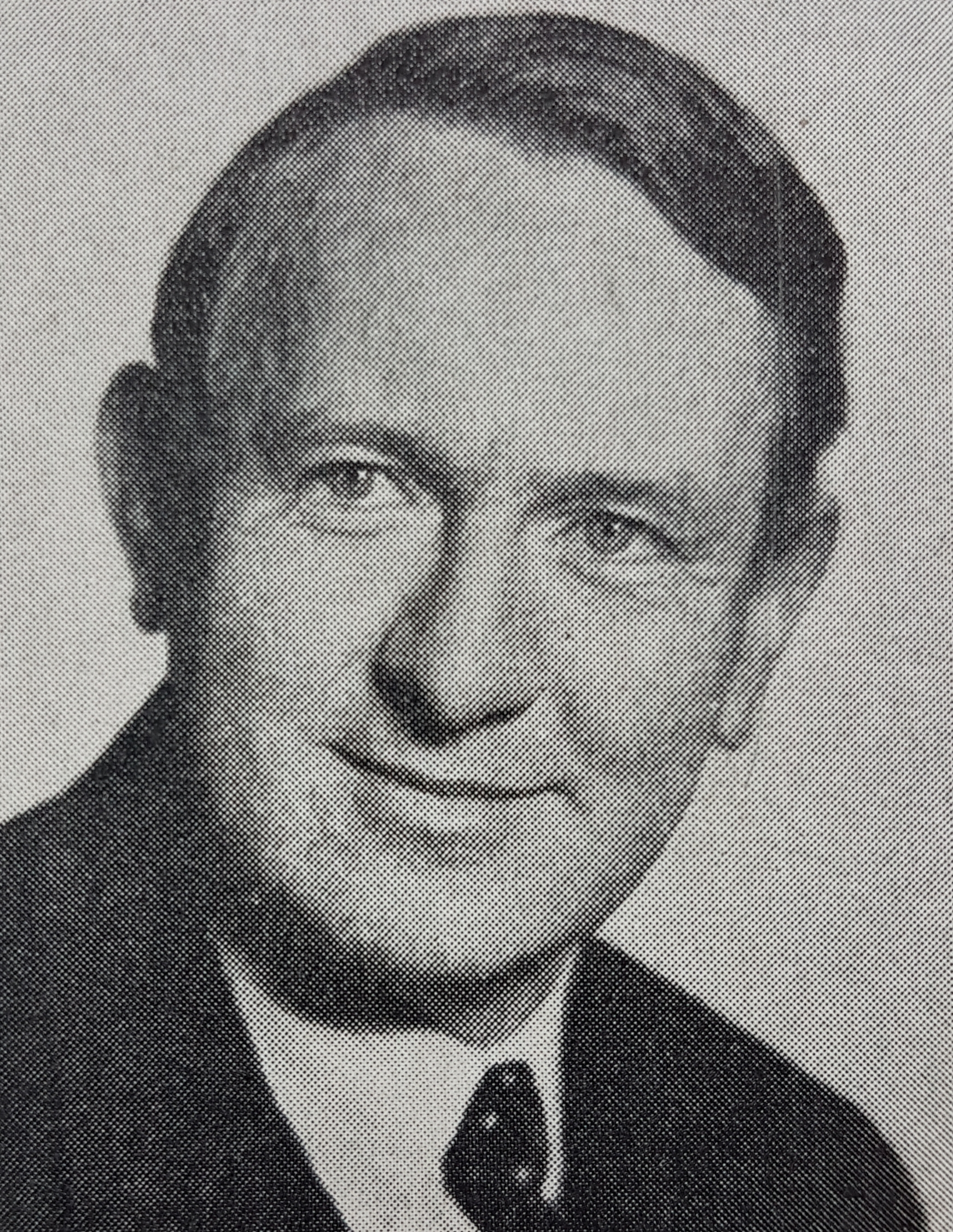
Trygve Thorsen

Anders Trygve Wittenstrøm Stålhandske Thorsen, (15 January 1892 – 24 October 1965) was a Norwegian sculptor.

He was born in Arendal. He was known mainly for his busts and reliefs. He sculpted portraits of Hulda Garborg, Bjørnstjerne Bjørnson, Karoline Bjørnson, and Christian Magnus Sinding-Larsen, among others.
