= Thorvald Mejdell =

Norwegian forester

Thorvald Mejdell (21 September 1824 – 28 October 1908) was a Norwegian forester.

He was born in the prestegjeld of Ringsaker as a son of colonel Gløer Gløersen Mejdell (1782–1827) and Thorine Krog. He was a nephew of officer Jacob Gerhard Meydell and brother of mining engineer Nicolai Mejdell, and an uncle of jurist and writer Glør Thorvald Mejdell. Also, through his sister he was a brother-in-law of Matthias Wilhelm Sinding and an uncle of Christian, Otto and Stephan Sinding.

He finished his secondary education in 1842, then studied and graduated with the cand.min. degree in 1847. He was a forest manager at Kongsberg Silver Works from 1848 to 1852, then studied forestry in Tharandt for three years before being hired as an adviser in the Ministry of Industry in 1855. Together with J. B. Barth he is credited with "being the first founders of [Norway's] forest administration". He was chief forester in Hedmark from 1857 and chief forester in the Norwegian Church Endowment from 1861 to 1875. From 1875 to 1892 he worked in the private company Kiær & Co.

He did not marry, and died in October 1908 in Kristiania.
