= Suite in the Old Style =

1891 composition by Christian Sinding

Suite in A minor, "Im alten Stil", for violin and orchestra, Op. 10, more famously known as "Suite in the Old Style" after its Norwegian epithet, is a composition for the violin and orchestra by the Norwegian composer Christian Sinding. Composed in 1891, it is mostly popular among violin players and fans. It is in three movements and has been recorded by Itzhak Perlman, Jascha Heifetz, and Joshua Bell, among others.
