= Vilhelm Mejdell =

Vilhelm Mejdell (17 April 1904 – 1989) was a Norwegian marketing agent and sports official.

He was born in Kristiania. He was an active sportsperson in his youth, winning national championships in rowing (fours) in 1924 and 1929. He represented the club Norske Studenters RK. During World War II he was member of Milorg, and later of the Norwegian Home Guard. He was also an active pistol shooter, and served as president of the Norwegian Shooting Association from 1965 to 1968. He was an honorary member.

Mejdell graduated with the cand.oecon. degree in 1935. In 1945 he was hired in the adversiting agency Myres Reklamebyrå. He was later promoted to CEO, and remained here until his retirement. He died in 1989.
