= Egil Kraggerud =

Norwegian philologist

Egil Kraggerud (born 7 July 1939) is a Norwegian philologist.

He was born in Hemnes as a son of dentist John Kraggerud (1903–1991) and teacher Borghild Johanne Westeren (1904–1988). He took the examen artium at Oslo Cathedral School in 1957, and studied classical philology for five years at the University of Oslo. He took examinations in Latin and Greek in 1963 and 1964, but not the cand.philol. degree. Nonetheless, he was hired as a research fellow in 1965 and took the dr.philos. degree in 1968 with the thesis Aeneisstudien, a study of Virgil's Aeneid. In June 1963 he married teacher Ellen Beate Sinding-Larsen, and became a son-in-law of Henning Sinding-Larsen. Their son Henning Kraggerud is a notable violinist.

At the University of Oslo, Kraggerud was promoted to lecturer in 1967 and professor already in 1969, succeeding an important teacher of his, Leiv Amundsen. He has translated works by Virgil, Aeschylus, Euripides and Boethius, and has also studied Horace, Tacitus, Henrik Ibsen and Norwegian medieval scholars. He edited the academic journal Symbolae Osloenses from 1972 to 1994, and retired in 2002. He is a member of the Norwegian Academy of Science and Letters since 1974, the Royal Norwegian Society of Sciences and Letters since 1985 and Academia Europaea since 1989. He was awarded the Norwegian Academy Prize in memory of Thorleif Dahl in 1992.
