= Uranienborg, Norway =

Neighborhood in Frogner, Oslo, Norway

Coordinates: 59°55′20.40″N 10°43′7.50″E

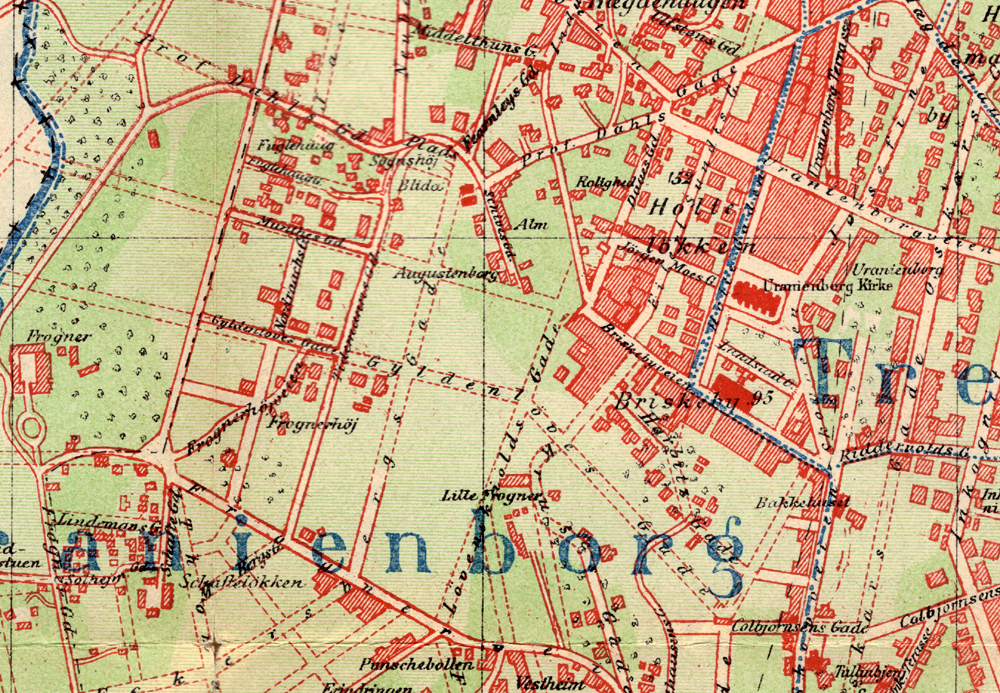
Map of Uranienborg, c.1900

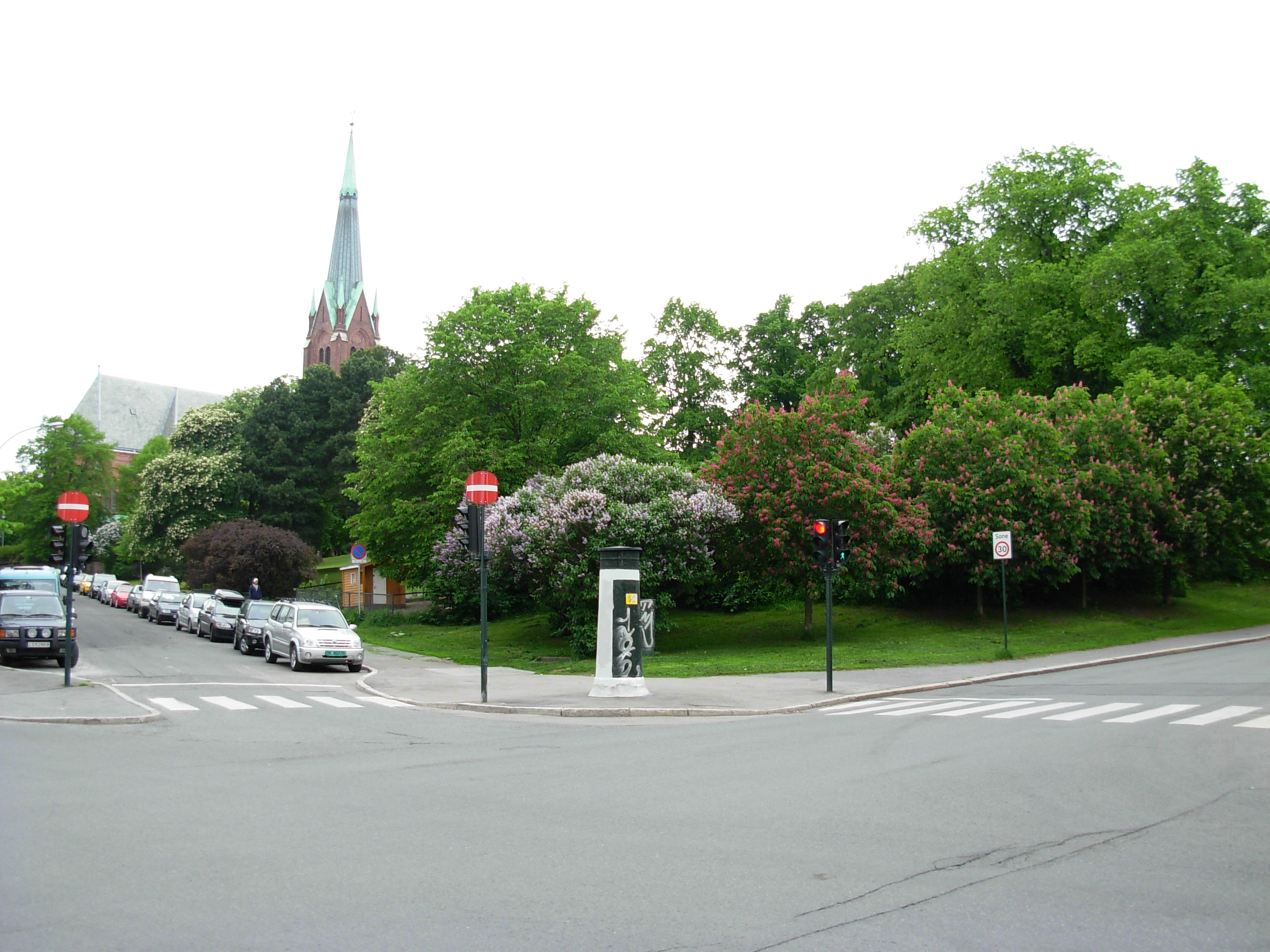
Uranienborg park with spire of Uranienborg Church

Uranienborg is a neighborhood in the borough of Frogner in Oslo, Norway.

== History ==
Originally a rural area in the former municipality Aker, it was incorporated into the city of Christiania (later Oslo) in 1859. The property used to have a wonderful view, and it was therefore named after the famous observatory Uranienborg at the island of Ven. It received public transport with the Briskeby Line. From 1988 to 2004 it formed the borough Uranienborg-Majorstuen together with Majorstuen; in 2004 it was incorporated into Frogner borough.

== Uranienborg Park ==
Uranienborg is the site of Uranienborgparken, the park where Uranienborg Church is located. The park contains a bronze statue of the Lutheran church reformer Hans Nielsen Hauge. The church is noted for its interior design by architect Arnstein Arneberg and for its stained glass by the artist Emanuel Vigeland.
