= Frühlingsrauschen =

1896 piano composition by Christian Sinding

Frühlingsrauschen
MIDI reproduction using a Yamaha CFIII SoundFont

Frühlingsrauschen, Op. 32, No. 3 (Rustle of Spring) is a solo piano piece written by the Norwegian composer Christian Sinding in 1896. It is Sinding's most popular piece of music. The piece is written in salon style as a piece meant for entertainment, and was very popular in the United States.

== Structure ==
Bearing the expression marking agitato, much of the piece is played with a rapid arpeggio in the right hand part, while the left hand carries the melody. The work's title indicates that its sense of constant motion is symbolic of the excited restlessness of springtime. The score has some technically challenging sections, but is, for the most part, easier to play than it sounds, with most of the rapidity made up of simply arpeggiated passages.

For its popularity and ability to impress, the piece is a common part of many pianists' repertoires.

The piece is in D♭ major, and several times shifts to related keys such as F minor and A♭ major, as well as modulating via chromatic harmonies to more remote keys like G minor and A major. Its form may be described thus:

- (a) 16-bar main theme, starting in B♭ minor, passing through F minor, and ending in A♭ major (the dominant);
- (b) 14-bar extension to main theme, beginning in F minor, and further developing the theme, and moving via sequence through G minor and A major, before shifting suddenly back to D♭ major as a climax;
- (c) Varied repetition of (a);
- (d) Varied repetition of (b);
- (e) Near-exact repetition of (a) (except for first 4 bars, which are varied yet again);
- (f) Exact repetition of (b);
- (g) Coda, consisting of shortened version of (a) (varied in the same manner as (c)), this time staying in D♭ major instead of modulating, followed by a cadence based on this theme, and decorated by extensive scale and arpeggio passages.

An orchestral version of "Rustle of Spring" appears as part of the score to Harman and Ising's 1936 Happy Harmonies cartoon The Early Bird and the Worm. The piece features prominently in the 1939 Hollywood film Intermezzo, first in an orchestral arrangement, and then with its main melody hummed and played on piano by Ingrid Bergman's character Anita Hoffman. Its melody is quoted in a few parts of Meredith Willson's 1957 musical The Music Man. The piece also appears in the second episode of Dennis Potter's 1986 TV series The Singing Detective.

The London Philharmonic Orchestra's orchestral version of "Rustle of Spring" came to notoriety in Canada for its use as wait time music by the Canada Revenue Agency.
