= Uranienborg Church =

- Uranienborg kirke
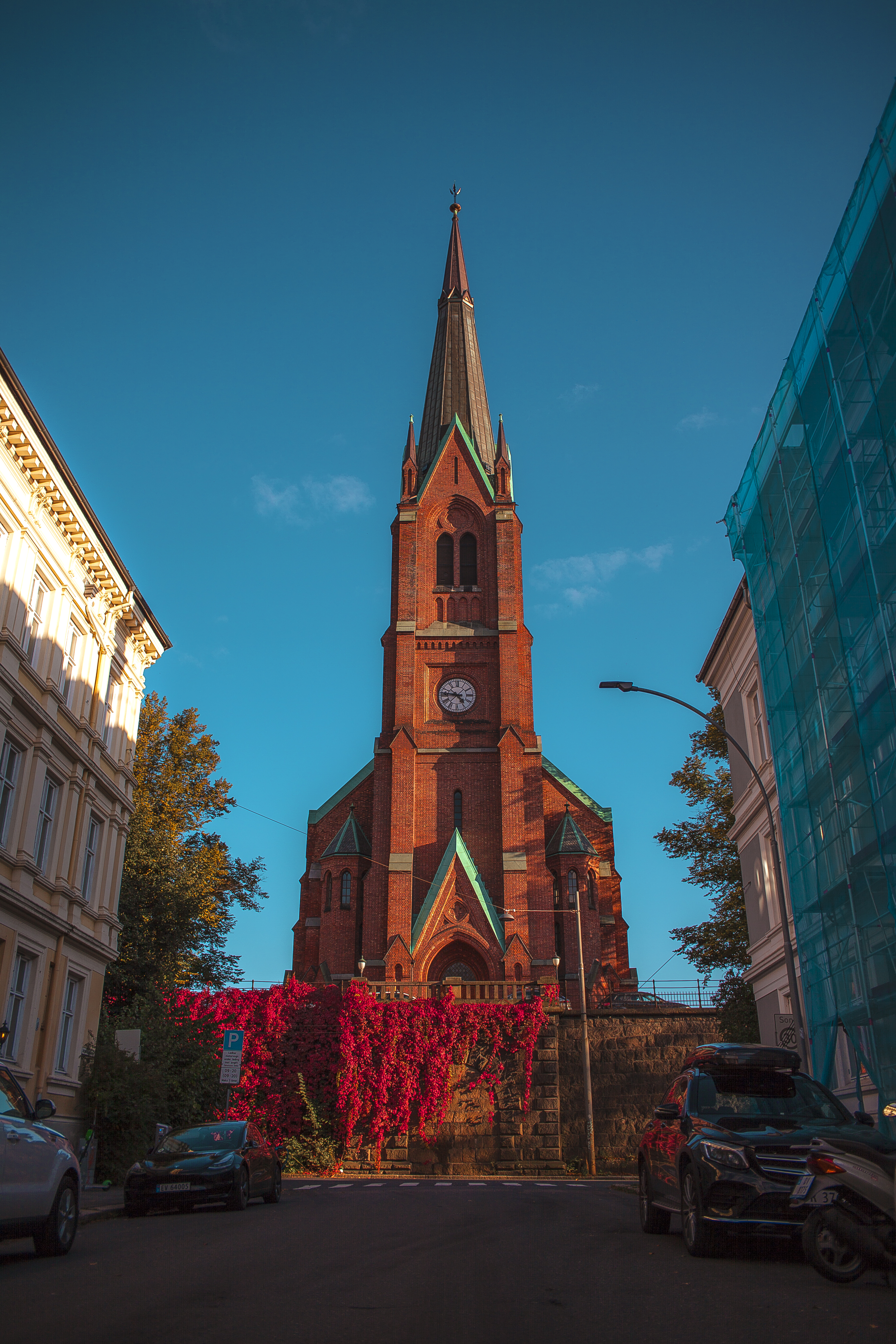

- Location within Oslo Location within Norway
- 59°55′16″N 10°43′11″E
- Location: Uranienborg, Oslo,
- Country: Norway
- Denomination: Church of Norway
- Churchmanship: Evangelical Lutheran
- Website: uranienborgkirke.no

History
- Status: Parish church
- Consecrated: 1886

Architecture
- Functional status: Active
- Architect: Balthazar Lange
- Style: Neo Gothique architecture

Specifications
- Materials: Brick

Administration
- Diocese: Diocese of Oslo
- Parish: Uranienborg

Uranienborg church is a parish church in Oslo, Norway.

The church is situated in the neighborhood of Uranienborg, next to Uranienborg Park behind the Royal Palace. Both the church and Uranienborg school just below were constructed in 1886. The church was built of brick and was the most expensive of all churches erected within Christiania (now Oslo) at this time. The church was designed by Balthazar Lange who was city architect in Christiania from 1898 to 1920. It was consecrated on 22 December 1886. The building is given a Gothic feel and was decorated with stained glass by the artist Emanuel Vigeland. The church was initially decorated with frescoes by Enevold Thømt, which have since been lost. In 1930 the interior received its present form by architect Arnstein Arneberg. The church has 1020 seats.

== Gallery ==
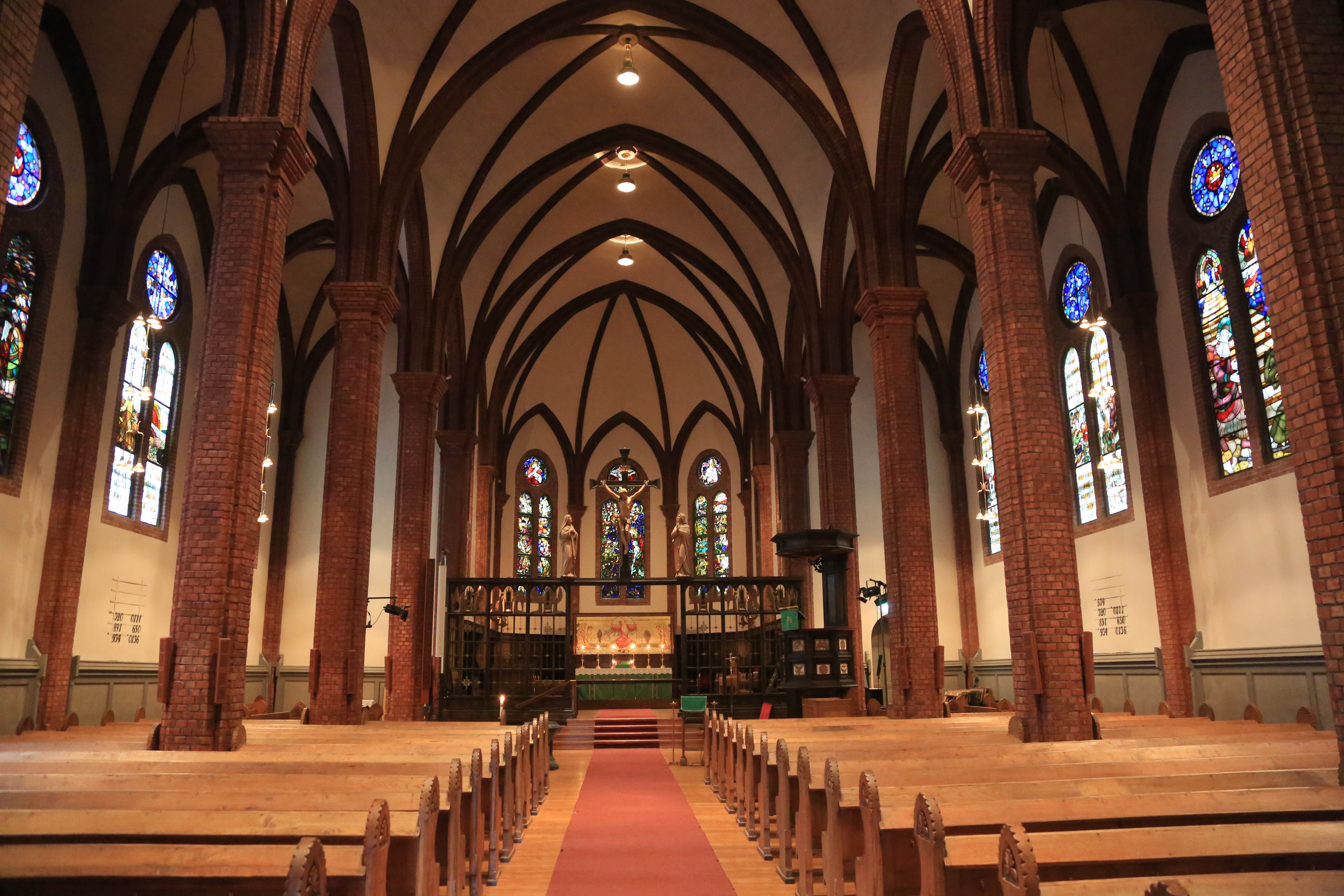
Interior

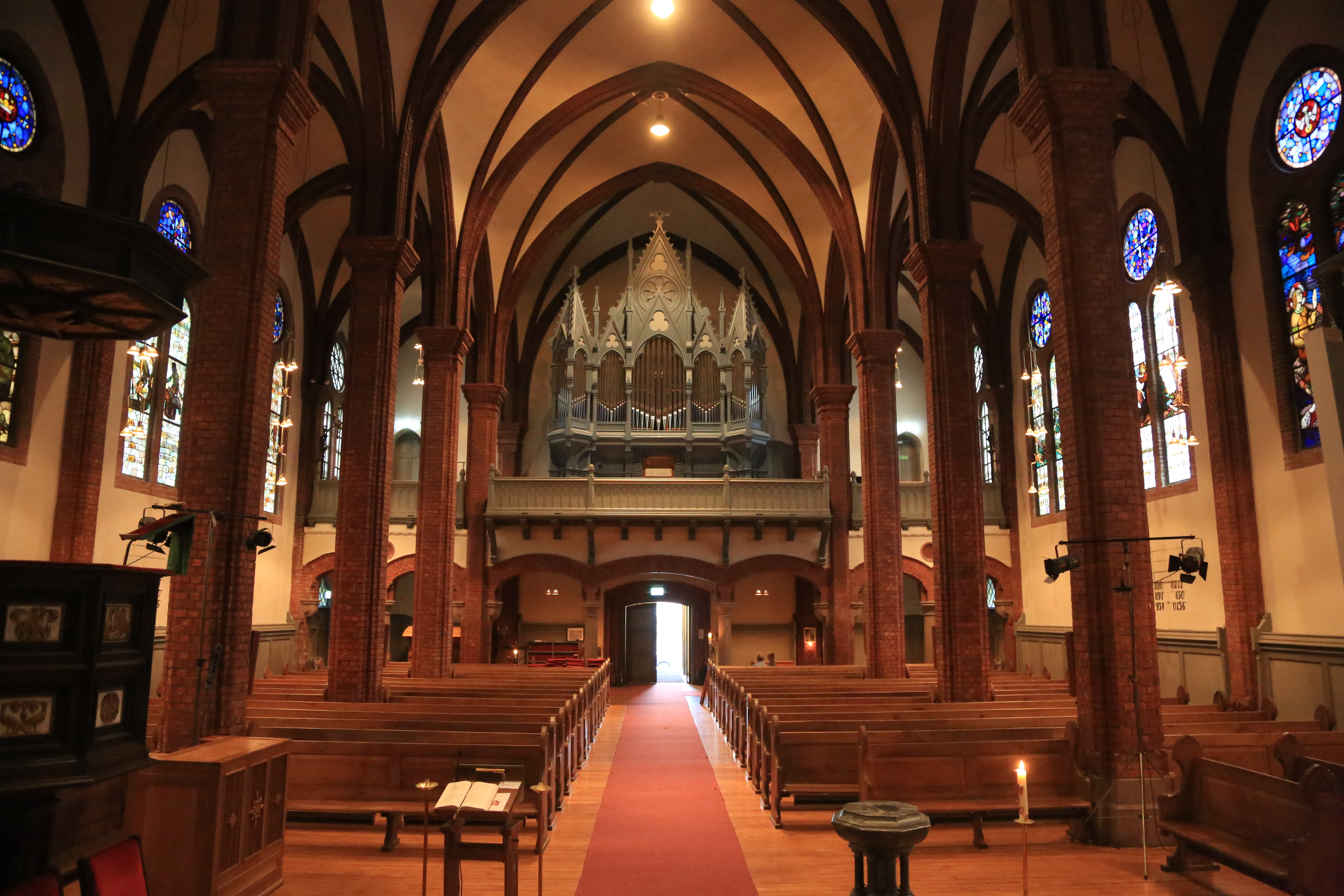
Sanctuary

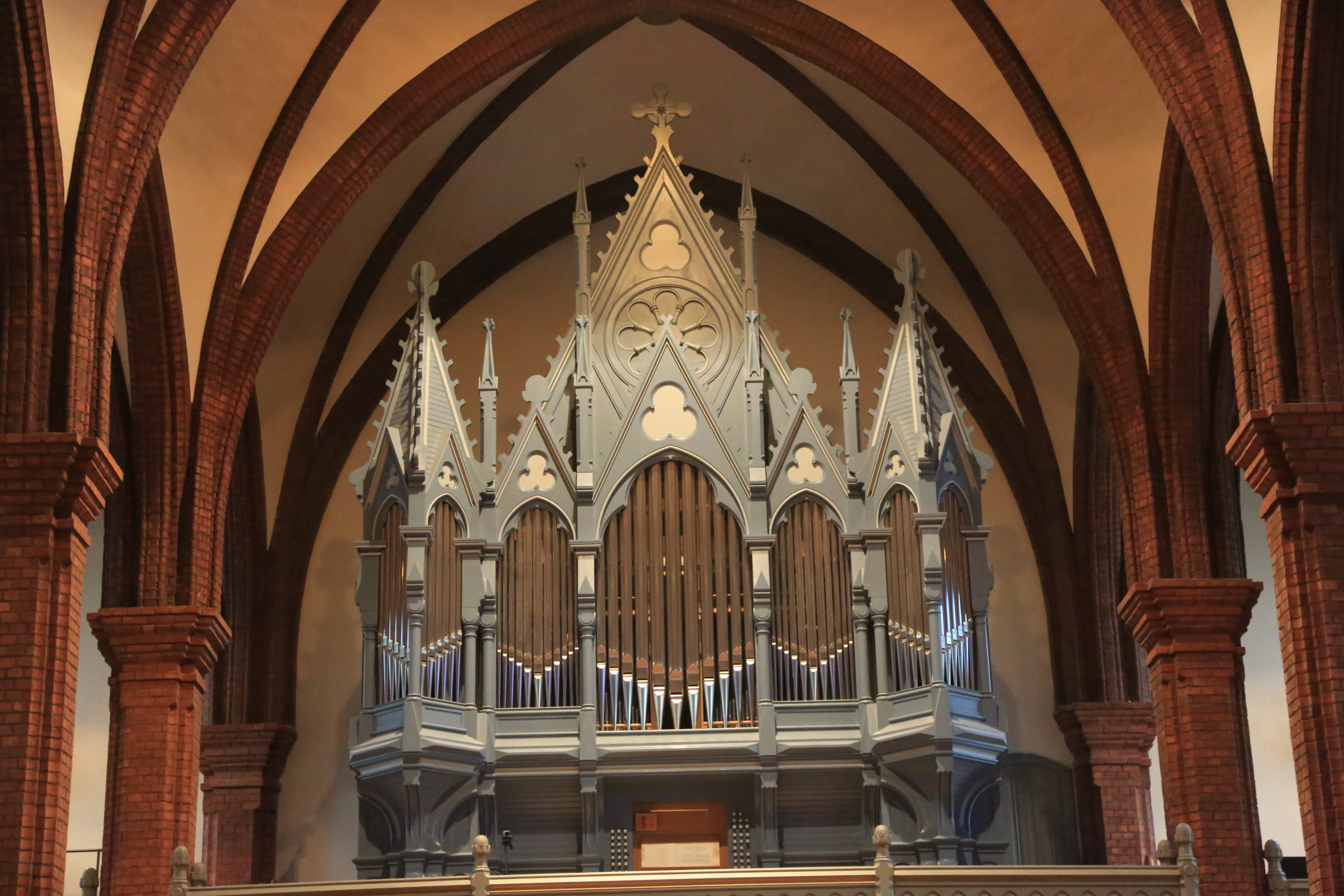
Organ

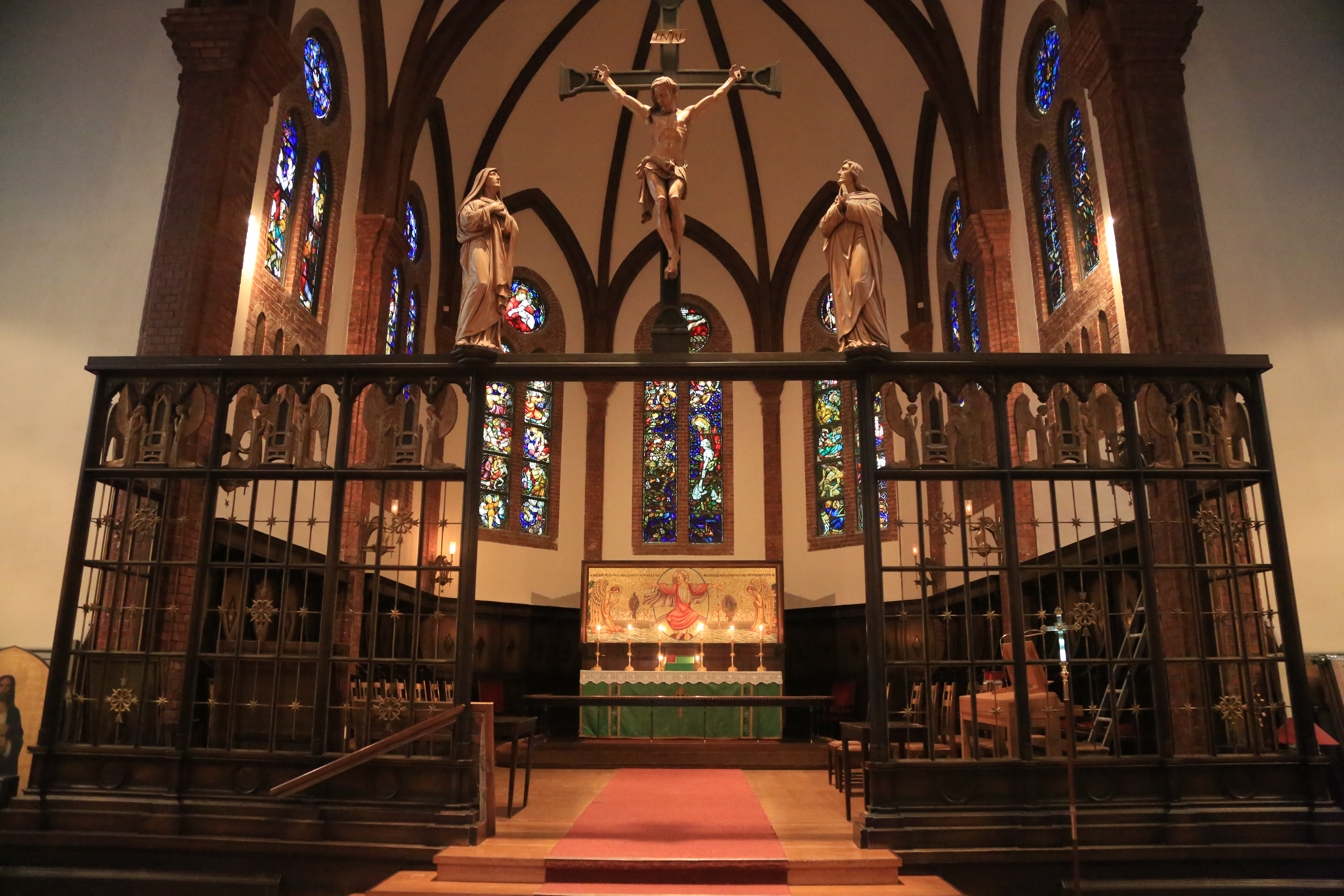
Altar

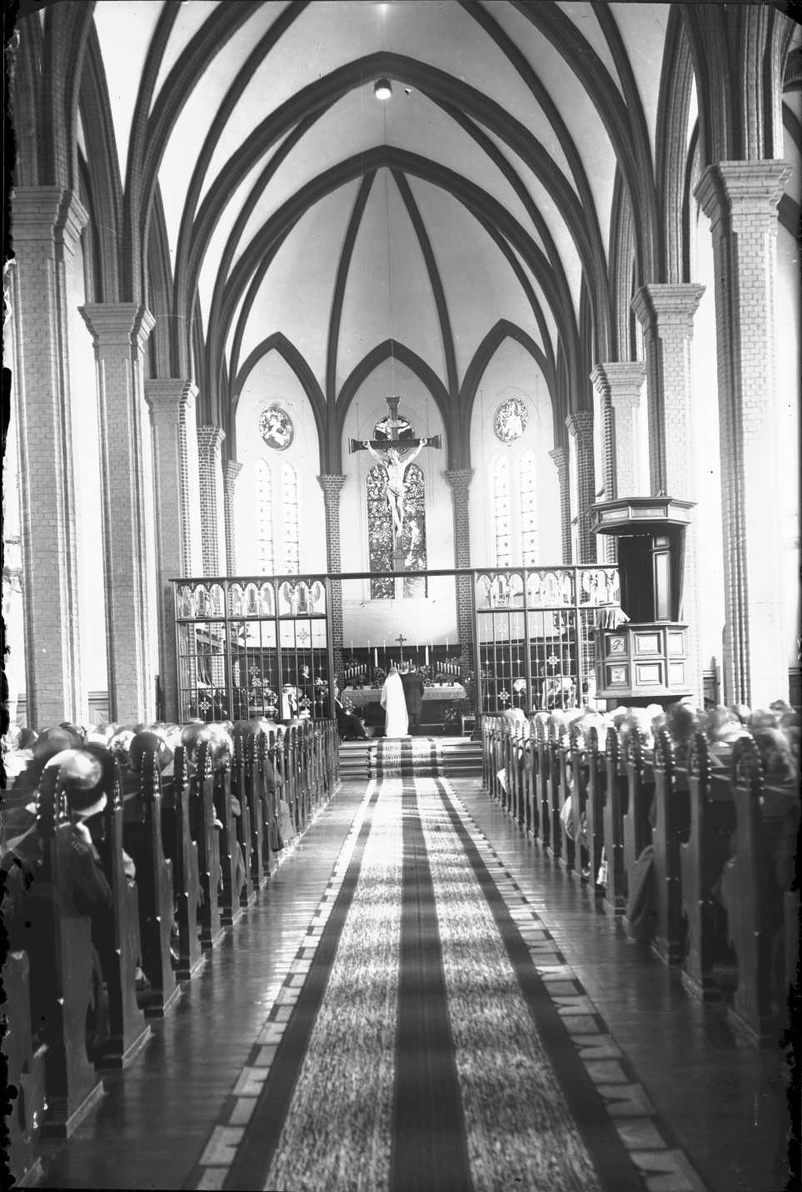
Wedding, circa 1930

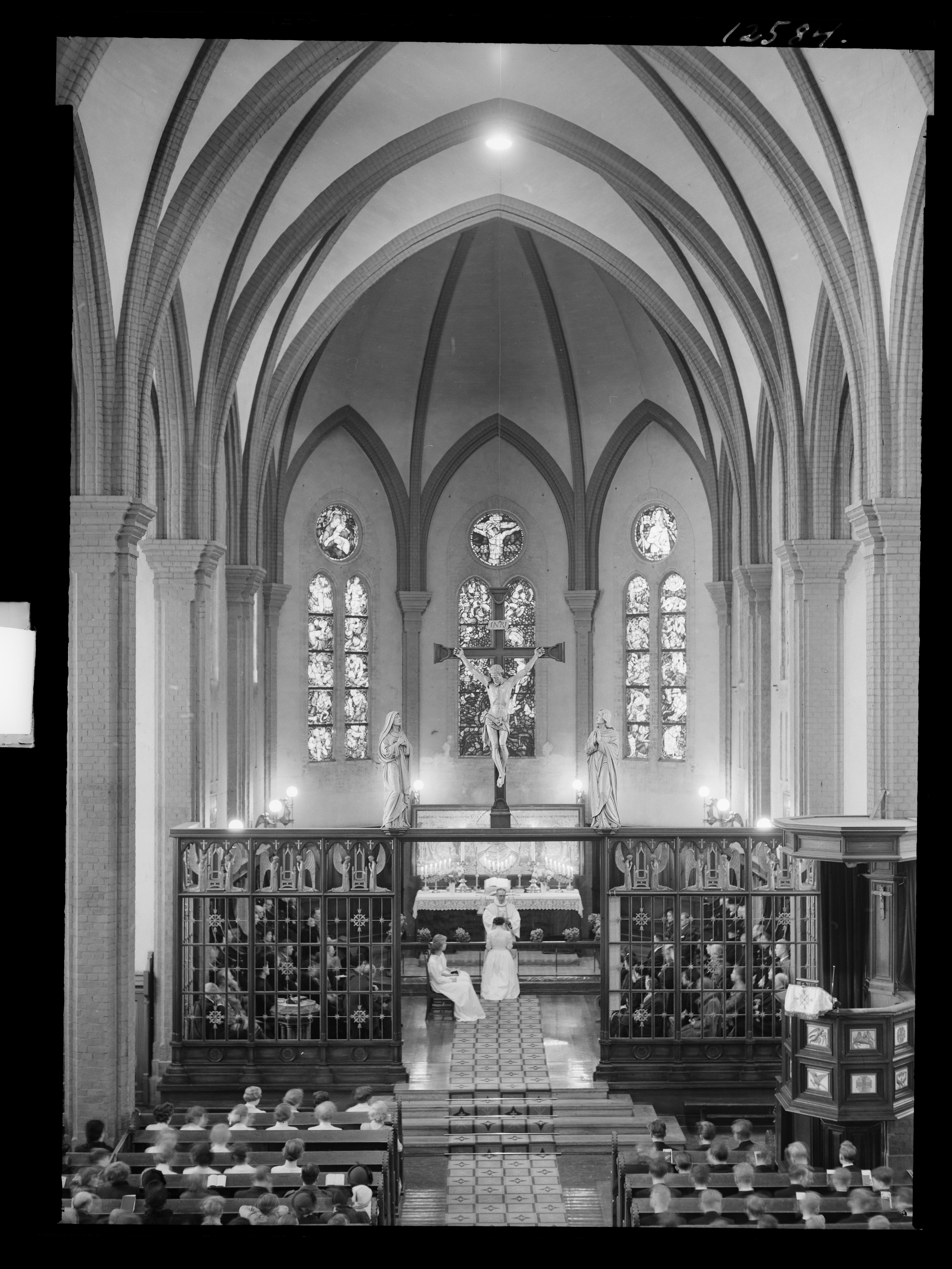
Confirmation, circa 1952
