= Matthias Wilhelm Sinding =

Norwegian mining engineer and factory founder (1811–1860)

Matthias Wilhelm Sinding (18 July 1811 – 11 February 1860) was a Norwegian mining engineer and factory founder.

He was born in Fredrikstad as a son of Ulrik Rosing Sinding and Mette Marie Bang. He was a distant relative of Hans Rosing (1625–1699).

In May 1841 in Kongsberg he married Cecilie Marie Mejdell (1817–1886), a sister of Nicolai and Thorvald Mejdell and an aunt of Glør Thorvald Mejdell. They had three notable children; Christian, Otto and Stephan Sinding. Christian was a composer, Otto a painter and Stephan a sculptor. Through Otto he was the paternal grandfather of painter Sigmund Sinding, and through his own brother and sister he was an uncle of Alfred Sinding-Larsen and the three siblings Ernst Anton Henrik Sinding, Elisabeth Sinding and Gustav Adolf Sinding.

He finished his secondary education as a private candidate in 1831, then graduated in mining from the Royal Frederick University in 1835. He worked for the Royal Norwegian Mint in Kongsberg from 1836 to 1841. He remained at Kongsberg until 1844, when he assumed a position as mine superintendent in Central and Northern Norway. He contributed to the change in sulfuric acid factories, from the use of sulfur to the use of pyrite as a raw material. He founded his own sulfuric acid factory Lysaker Kemiske Fabrik in 1859, but died in February 1860 in Lillehammer.
