= Holger Sinding-Larsen =

Norwegian architect (1869–1938)

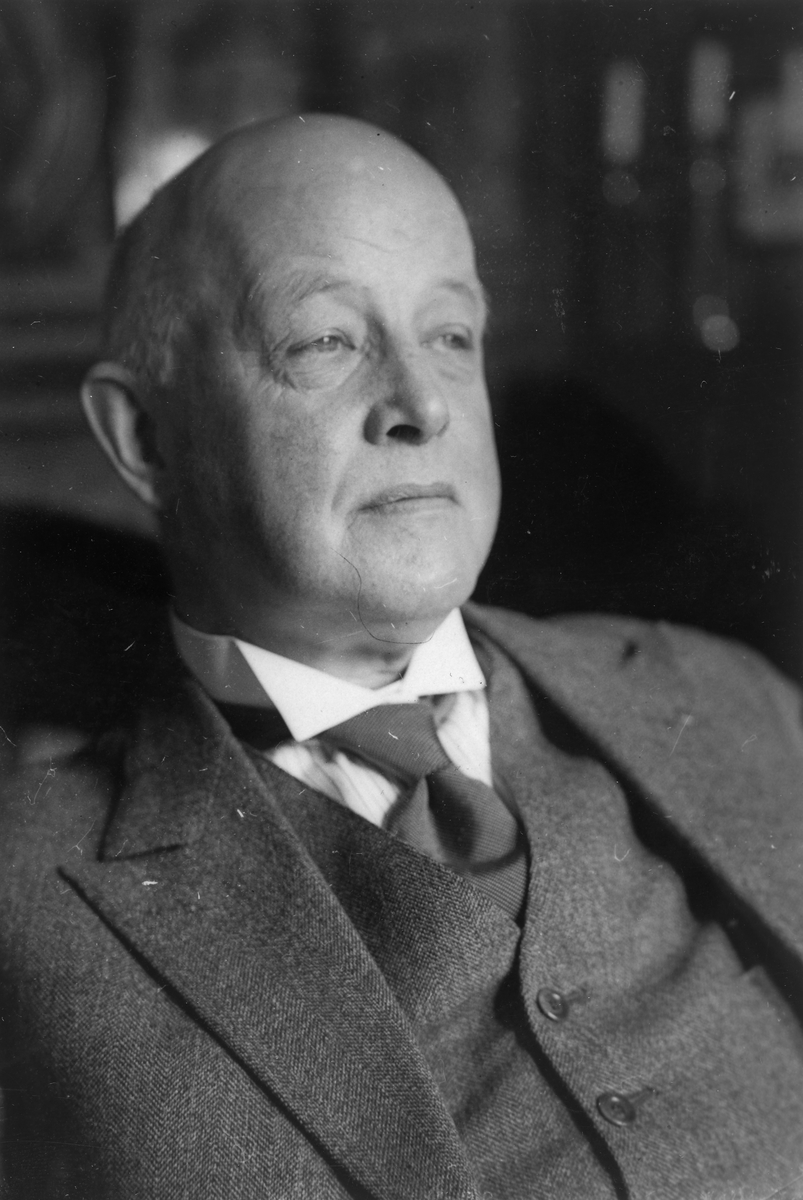
- Portrait of Sinding-Larsen. Image in Oslo Museum.
- Born: Peter Andreas Holger Sinding-Larsen; 5 July 1869; Oslo, Norway
- Died: 12 December 1938 (aged 69)
- Occupation: Architect
- Notable work: Akershus Fortress
- Father: Alfred Sinding-Larsen
- Relatives: Christian Magnus Sinding-Larsen (brother) Birger Fredrik Sinding-Larsen (brother) Kristofer Sinding-Larsen (brother)
Olympic medal record
Art competitions
Silver medal – second place	1920 Antwerp	Town planning

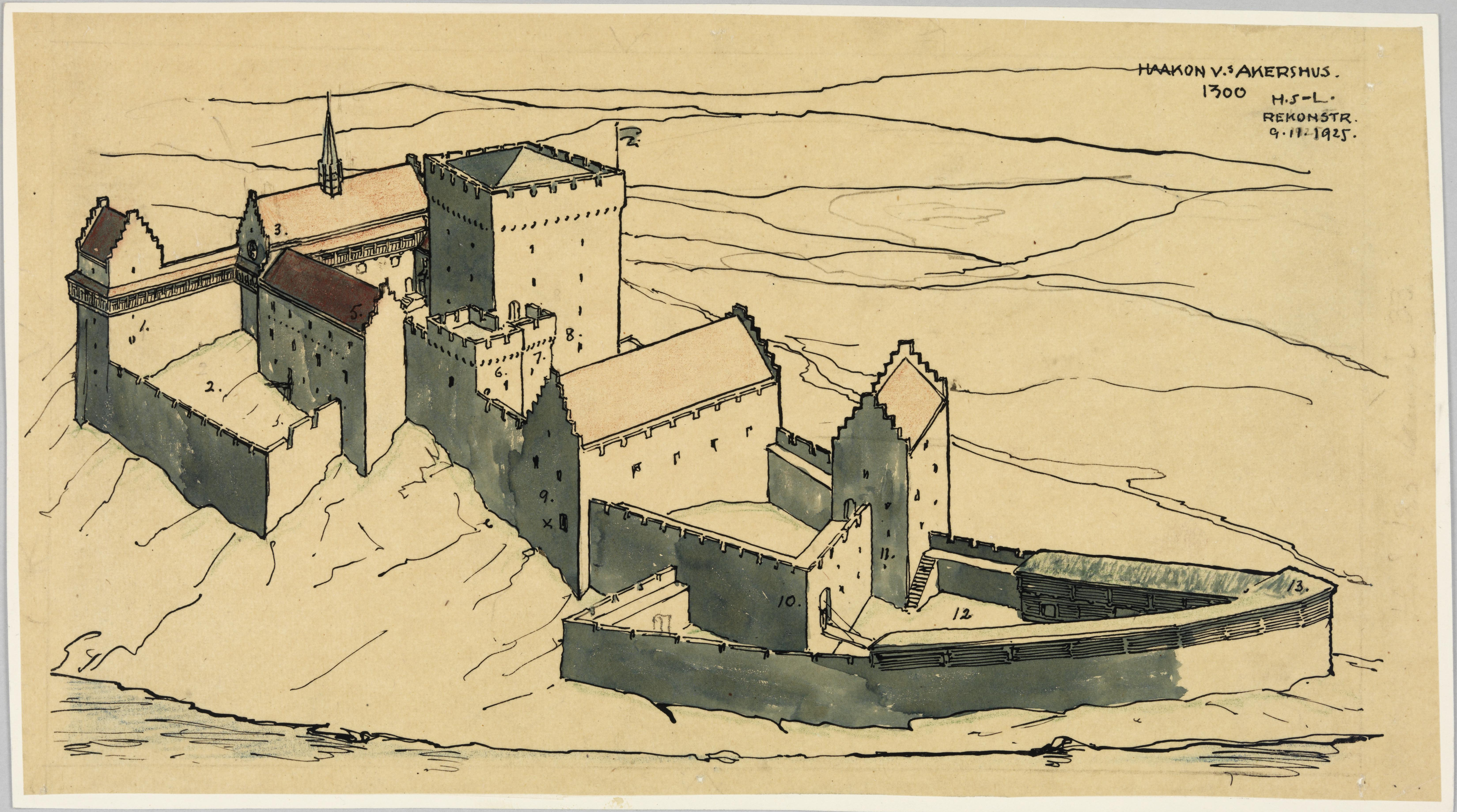
Drawing of Akershus c. 1300 by Holger Sinding-Larsen (9 November 1925)

Peter Andreas Holger Sinding-Larsen (5 July 1869 – 12 December 1938) was a Norwegian architect. He is most associated with his work at Akershus Fortress, where he was a member of the restoration committee and architect from 1905 to 1922.

== Biography ==
Sinding-Larsen was born in Christiania (now Oslo), Norway. He was the son of Alfred Sinding-Larsen (1839–1911) and Elisabeth Lange (1842–1887). He was a brother of physician Christian Magnus Sinding-Larsen, colonel Birger Fredrik Sinding-Larsen and painter Kristofer Sinding-Larsen.

Sinding-Larsen began his education at Kristiania tekniske skole (now Oslo ingeniørhøgskole) from 1885 to 1889 and received training from Herman Major Schirmer during surveying in Gudbrandsdalen. Then he studied in Berlin at the Technische Hochschule Charlottenburg (now Technische Universität Berlin) from 1892 to 1893 and served as an assistant under Johannes Vollmer in 1893. In the latter half of the 1890s, he went on study trips to Spain, Italy and Greece, but also to the UK and Sweden.

In 1895, he won the competition to design Holmenkollen Chapel from among 27 participants. He married Sine Broch Martens on 28 December 1895, at Johanneskirken in Bergen, Norway. He was in Paris for the Exposition Universelle (1900), where he designed the Norwegian Pavilion. In 1907, he became building inspector for the University of Christiania (now University of Oslo), a position he held until 1924. During the years between 1904 and 1915, he designed a number of large buildings at the university as well as several churches. Holger Sinding-Larsen was also awarded a silver medal for Designs for Town Planning in connection with the 1920 Summer Olympics in Antwerp.

Sinding-Larsen founded the Young Architects Association in 1891. In 1906, he started the Christiania Architectural Association, he also served as a teacher at the National Academy of the Arts School. He was awarded the King's Medal of Merit in gold and Fridtjof Nansen Prize for Outstanding Research. He was also knighted in the Swedish Order of Vasa.
