= Christian Sinding =

Norwegian composer (1856–1941)

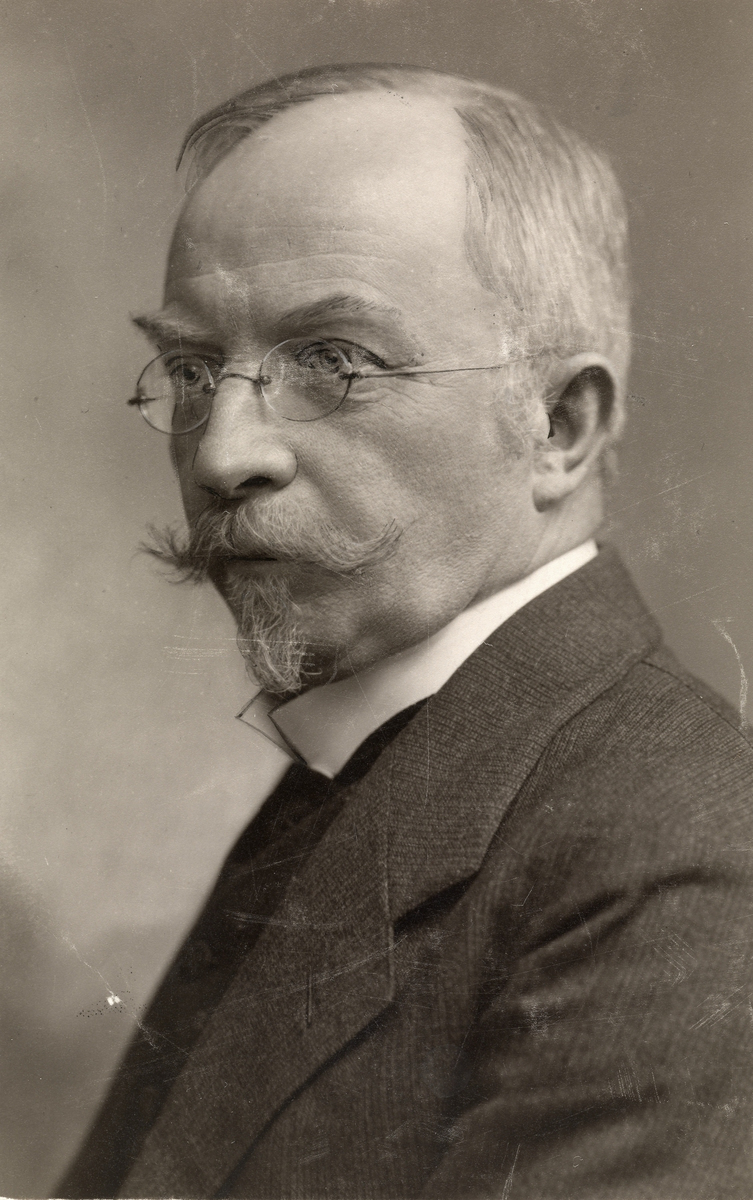
- Sinding c. 1930
- Born: 11 January 1856; Kongsberg, Sweden-Norway
- Died: 3 December 1941 (aged 85); Oslo, Reichskommissariat Norwegen
- Occupation: Composer

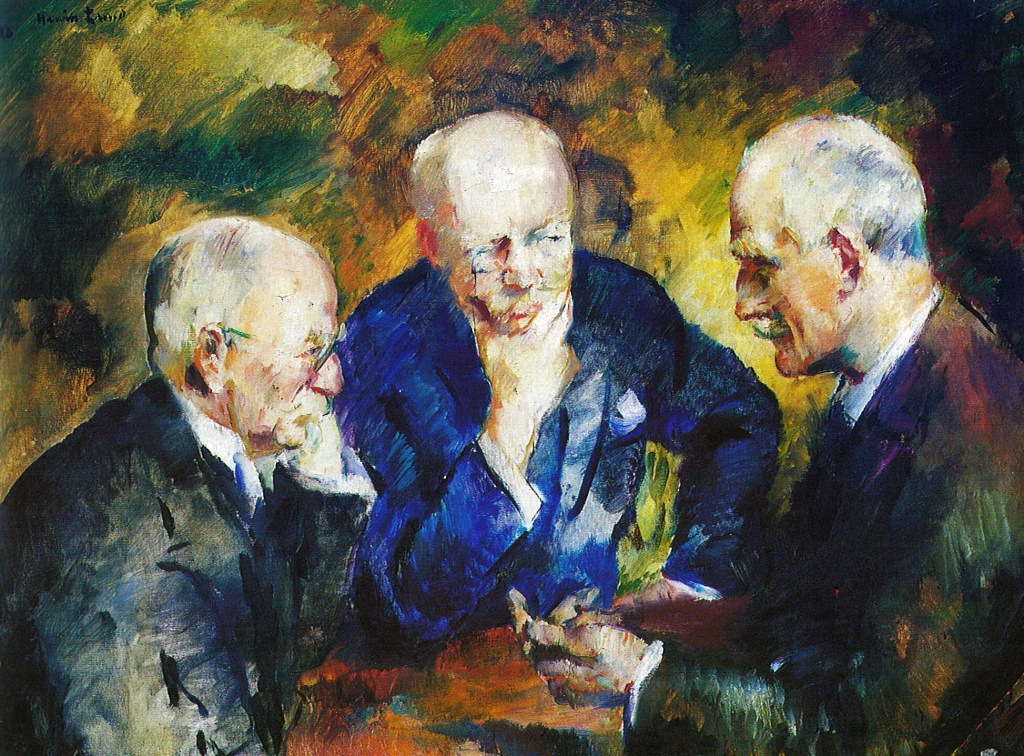
Christian Sinding, Gunnar Heiberg and Knut Hamsun, painted by Henrik Lund, 1926

Christian August Sinding (11 January 1856 – 3 December 1941) was a Norwegian composer. He is best known for his lyrical work for piano Frühlingsrauschen (Rustle of Spring, 1896). He was often compared to Edvard Grieg and regarded as his successor.

== Personal life ==
Sinding was born at Kongsberg in Buskerud, Norway. His parents were mine superintendent Matthias Wilhelm Sinding and Cecilie Marie Mejdell. He was a brother of the painter Otto Sinding and the sculptor Stephan Sinding.

In November 1898 he married actress Augusta Gade, née Smith-Petersen (1858–1936). She was the daughter of Morten Smith-Petersen and Cathrine von der Lippe. She had previously been married to physician and art patron Fredrik Georg Gade.

== Career ==
He studied music first in Christiania (now Oslo) before going to Germany, where he studied at the conservatory in Leipzig under Salomon Jadassohn and fell under the musical influences of Wagner and Liszt. He lived in Germany for much of his life, but received regular grants from the Norwegian government. In 1921–22 he went to the United States of America to teach composition for a season at the Eastman School of Music in Rochester, New York.

Sinding's publishers required from him piano and chamber music, which had broader sales than the symphonic works he preferred. His own instrument was the violin. The large number of short, lyrical piano pieces and songs that Sinding wrote has led to many seeing him as the heir to his fellow countryman, Edvard Grieg, not so much in musical style but as a Norwegian composer with an international reputation. Sinding is best remembered today for one of his piano works, Frühlingsrauschen (Rustle of Spring, 1896). Among his other works are four symphonies, three violin concertos, a piano concerto, chamber music, songs and choral works to Norwegian texts, and an opera, Der Heilige Berg (The Holy Mountain, 1914).

== Awards ==
Sinding was made a member of the Order of St. Olav in 1905 and Commander in 1916, and in 1938, received the Grand Cross. He was appointed a Commander of the Order of Vasa and in 1905, he was made a member of the Royal Swedish Academy of Music. In 1924 he was granted the honor of lifetime residence at Henrik Wergeland's former home, Grotten in Oslo.

== Legacy ==
Sinding had suffered from severe senile dementia since the late 1930s. Eight weeks before his death in 1941, Sinding joined the Norwegian Nazi party, Nasjonal Samling - however, his membership card was unsigned. The Nazis had strong motivation to recruit Sinding, as he was tremendously popular before the war in both Norway and Germany. Following the liberation of Norway at the end of World War II, it was official practice for the national broadcasting system to boycott people seen as Nazi sympathisers. As a consequence, Sinding's post-war reputation in Norway became relatively obscure. The circumstances surrounding the composer's membership continue to raise controversy. Sinding had made several remarks against the Nazi occupation. He had fought for the rights of Jewish musicians during the early 1930s and was a close friend of Nordahl Grieg.

== Documents ==
Letters by Christian Sinding held by the State Archives in Leipzig, company archives of the Music Publishing House C.F.Peters (Leipzig).
