= Danish nobility =

Socially privileged class in Denmark

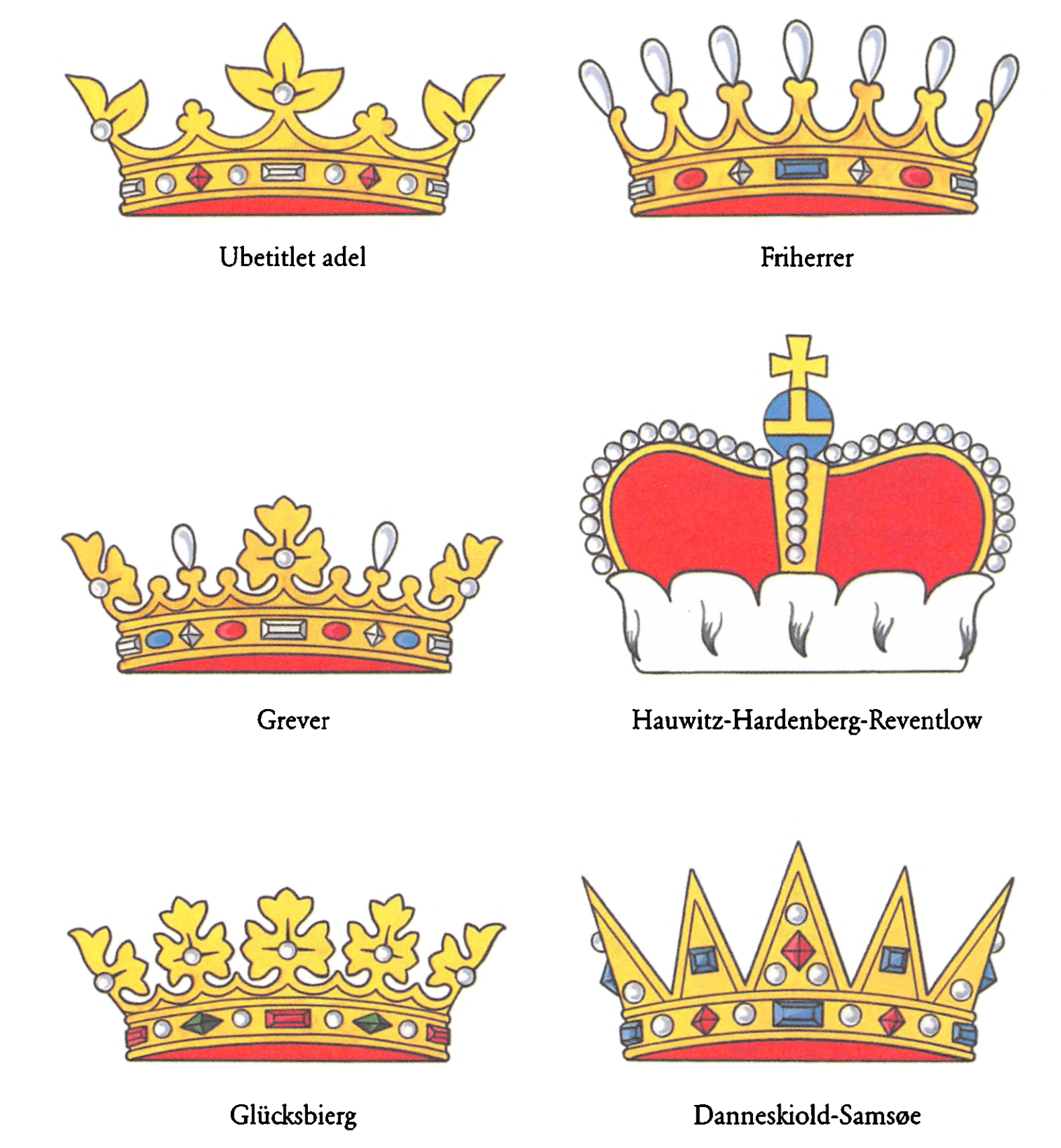
Drawings by Ronny Andersen of the coronets in Danish Noble Heraldry

Danish nobility is a social class and a former estate in the Kingdom of Denmark. The nobility has official recognition in Denmark, a monarchy. Its legal privileges were abolished with the constitution of 1849. Some of the families still own and reside in castles or country houses. A minority of nobles still belong to the elite, and they are as such present at royal events where they hold court posts, are guests, or are objects of media coverage, for example Kanal 4's TV-hostess Caroline Fleming née Baroness Iuel-Brockdorff. Some of them own and manage companies or have leading positions within business, banking, diplomacy and NGOs.

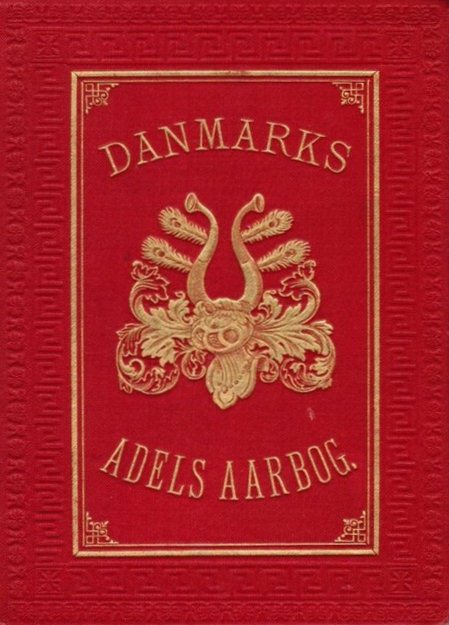
Cover of Danmarks Adels Aarbog (Peerage of the Danish Nobility)

Historians divide the Danish nobility into two categories: ancient nobility (Danish: uradel) and letter nobility (Danish: brevadel) based on the way they achieved nobility. Another status-based categorization distinguishes between higher and lower nobility (Danish: højadel, lavadel).

"Ancient nobility" refers to those noble families that are known from the era before the Danish Reformation where we have no exact knowledge of how they attained noble status, whereas letter nobility are those families that received their rank by a patent at the time of their elevation to the nobility. Families of the Lord High Councillors of Denmark before the introduction of absolutism in Denmark in 1660 and houses endowed with a title from 1671 onwards are regarded as higher nobility of Denmark, whereas all other noble families are considered lower nobility.

In 1671 a new titled higher nobility was introduced with the ranks of count and baron available for families that owned estates with a minimum of 2,500 and 1,000 barrels of land hartkorn respectively and were willing to allocate them as feudal counties and baronies to be inherited by primogeniture with the possessor receiving the title of lensgreve (lit. 'fief count') or lensbaron (lit. 'fief baron'). Despite their patents – which in reality were subjugations to a nascent absolutist state, most nobles who were elevated to the titled nobility by the post-1671 patents came from families that had belonged to the higher nobility before the introduction of absolutism, such as Brahe or Rantzau. The title of duke being restricted to the royal family and their relatives is in contrast to German and French usage. In Germany, most dukes had executive power within the Reichstag.

== Medieval nobility ==
A striking feature has been the close ties medieval Danish magnate families had with German (Thuringian, Lower-Saxon, etc.) counts: for example in the 13th century, there were several marriages between Danish magnate families and German counts in each generation.

- Members of the families of the counts of Orlamünde, Regenstein, Gleichen and Everstein settled in Scandinavia and became, for example, High Councillors and, a few of them, Lord High Constables of Denmark.
- Various branches of the Counts of Holstein contracted marriages with members or relatives of the Danish royal dynasty and occasionally were numbered among the highest nobles in Denmark. During the reign of Christopher II of Denmark and the early reign of Valdemar IV of Denmark, counts of Holstein held almost all fiefs in Denmark. Specifically, the Holsteins tended to ally with the Abel branch of the royal dynasty, which held the duchy of Southern Jutland, adjacent to Holstein. Ultimately, in the late 14th century, the Rendsborg branch of the House of Holstein inherited the south-Jutland duchy (henceforward known as Duchy of Schleswig) as Danish vassals. Adolf VIII, Count of Holstein, was offered the Danish royal throne in 1448, and after his refusal, his nephew Christian I of Denmark received it.
- The family of Putbusch (Podebusk in Danish, Putbus in Swedish and German), originally relatives of the earliest princes of Rügen, were almost Danish in the 14th century, their most prominent member being Henning Podebusk, the powerful Lord High Justiciar of Denmark during the reigns of King Valdemar IV and the Queen Margaret of Denmark. After the 16th century, one branch (the Kjørup branch) of the Podebusks remained in Denmark and belonged to the country's high nobility.

== Danish titles as of the 1671 laws ==
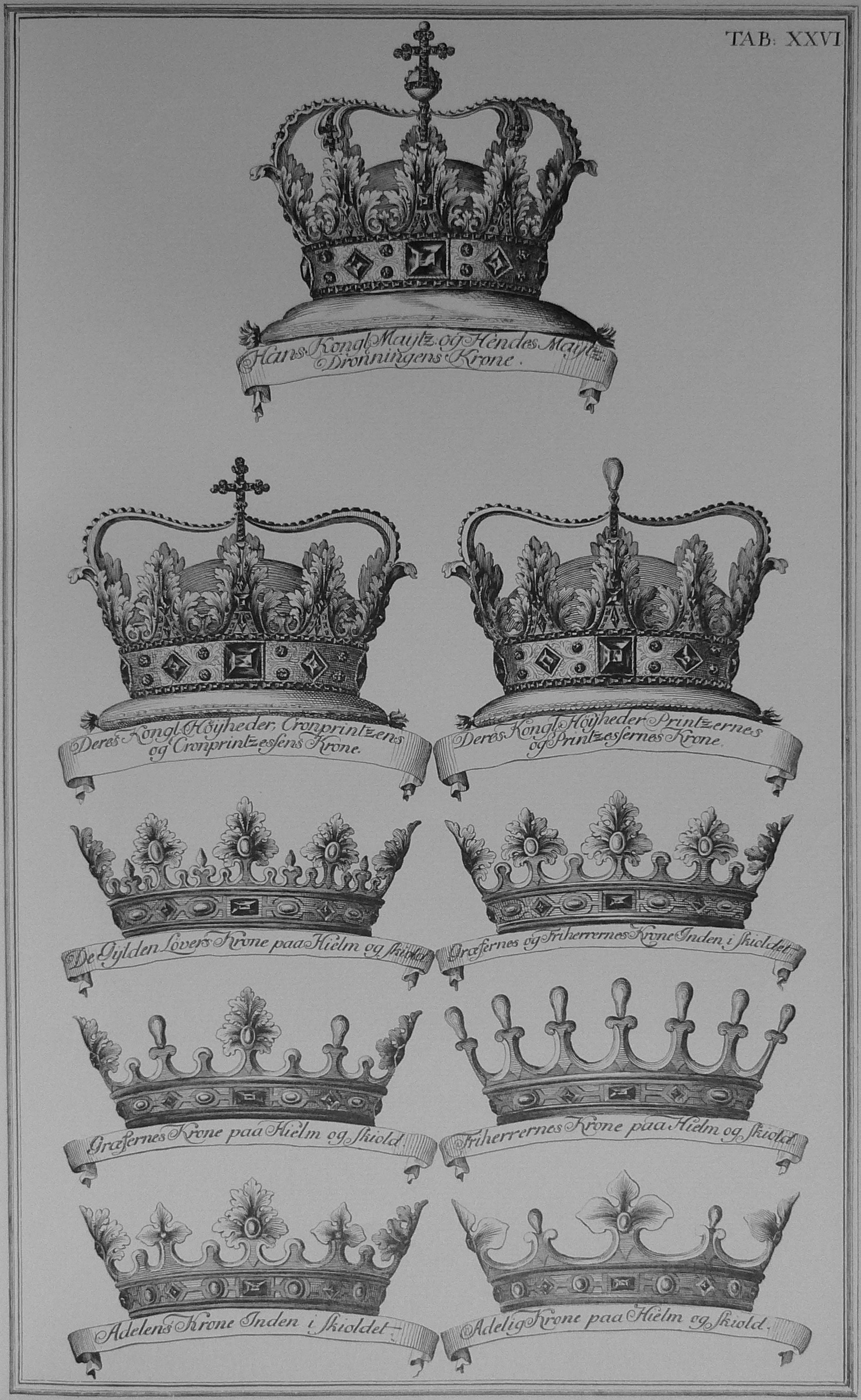
Dano-Norwegian coronets of rank. To each title one had the right to use a specific coronet. Artist: Lauritz de Thurah

The following system, which was introduced in 1671 with the titles of feudal count (lensgreve) and feudal baron (lensbaron), is currently in force:

Title	Title for wives	Title for sons	Title for daughters	Dignity or fief	English equivalent
hertug	hertuginde			hertugdømme	duke
markis (only in Norway)	markise			markisat (only in Norway)	marquess
greve	grevinde	greve or baron	komtesse	grevskab	earl or count
friherre baron	frifrue baronesse	friherre baron	friherrinde komtesse	friherreskab baroni	baron

Note: Gentlemen with foreign titles (German counts or Freiherren for example) ranked below Danish lensgreve and Danish lensfriherre. Thus from a Danish point of view, Friedrich von Ahlefeldt (see above), who had been distinguished in 1665 with a comital title by the emperor, was actually "elevated" when he became a Danish lensgreve after 1671. Of course his German title – which left him in the Lower Nobility in Germany – should not be termed "rigsgreve" as explained above, but perhaps "tyske greve".

=== Duke: a title reserved for the royal family and relatives, not part of the "nobility" ===
Two families bear the Danish title of duke, not being counted as "nobility":

- Dukes of Schleswig (hertug af Slesvig): originally, descendants of Gerhard III, who was granted the Duchy of Jutland, which was taken back, but the title was recognized in 1386. In 1459 the title passed through a female heiress to the House of Oldenburg, descending to its branches of Augustenborg, Pløn, Beck, Glücksburg/Lyksborg, Holstein-Gottorp, Sønderborg, Nordborg, Rethwisch, Ærø, Franzhagen, Wiesenburg. Although the members possessed the title of duke in Denmark sovereignty over these lands remained for centuries in the authority of their pater familias, the king of Denmark acting as its overlord.
- Duke of Glücksbierg (hertug af Glücksbierg): 1818 primogeniture within the French ducal family of Decazes.

Dukes had earlier the German-inspired style of Durchlauchtighed (German: Durchlaucht; English: Serene Highness), but Danish ducal titles are at present virtually non-existent. In historical contexts, for example, older predicates as (your) grace or højvelbårenhed are applied.

=== Marquess (only in Norway) ===
In 1709, Frederick IV of Denmark, in his capacity as King of Norway, granted the title Marquis of Lista to Hugo Octavius Accoramboni of Florence in Italy. Apparently, the Marquis of Lista died without issue.

In 1710, the same king granted the title Marquis of Mandal to Francisco di Ratta and to the latter's nephews Giuseppe di Ratta and Luigi di Ratta of Bologna in Italy. In Norway, official recognition of this title was abolished under the 1821 Nobility Law. In Denmark, it seems to have lasted until 1890.

Norway remains the only country in Scandinavia where the title of marquess has been granted, except for the Swedish Marquis Lagergren who received his title from the Pope.

== Comital and Baronial noble Danish families ==
There are two primary periodical reviews of Danish nobility:

- Danmarks Adels Aarbog (DAA), published by Dansk Adels Forening since 1884. It publishes genealogies of extant Danish noble families, approximately 725. Additionally, ancestry charts published in its editions, have reported approximately 200 extinct houses.
- Dansk Adelskalender

A

- Abildgaard
- Abrahamson
- Adeler
- Ahlefeldt
- Ahlefeldt-Laurvig
- Akeleye
- Anker
- Arenstorff
- Asp-Persson
- Astrup

B

- Bang
- Banner
- Bardenfleth
- Barnekow
- Barner
- Bartholin
- Beck
- Benzon
- Berger
- Berner
- Berner-Schilden
- Berregaard
- Bertouch
- Bielke
- Bille-Brahe
- Bille
- Blixen-Finecke
- Blücher-Altona
- Bonde
- Bonde-Wadenstierna
- Bornemann
- de Bretteville
- Bretton
- Brinck-Seidelin
- Brockdorff
- Brockenhuus-Schack
- Brummer
- Buchwald
- Bülow
- Bysted

C

- Castenschiold-Castenschiold-Grevenkop-Castenschiold
- Cederfeld-Simonsen
- Charisius
- Carney

D

- Dannemand
- Danneskiold-Samsøe
- Dirckinck-Holmfeld
- Düring-Rosenkrantz
- Daa

E

- Eberlin
- Eiben
- Ellbrecht

F

- Fabritius de Tengnagel
- Falkenskiold
- Falsen
- Fischer
- Fischer-Benzon
- Flindt
- Fogh
- Folsach
- Fontenay
- Fredberg
- Fønss

G

- Gähler
- Gersdorff
- Gyldenfeldt
- Güldencrone
- Güntelberg
- Gøye

H

- Halling
- Harbo
- Harbou
- Hauch
- Hambro
- Haxthausen
- Hedemann
- Hegermann-Lindencrone
- Heintze-Weissenrode
- Herbst
- Hofman-Bang
- Hoff
- Hoffman
- Holk
- Holck
- Holsten
- Holsten von Holsteinborg
- Hoppe
- Huitfeldt
- Huth
- Høeg
- Høegh-Guldberg

J

- Jakobsen
- Jermiin
- Jessen
- Irgens-Bergh
- Iuel/Juel
- Juul

K

- Kaalund
- Kaas
- Clauson-Kaas
- Klauman
- Klöcker
- Knuth
- Koefoed
- Kolderup-Rosenvinge
- Krabbe
- Kretzschmer
- Krieger
- Krogh

L

- Lasson
- Lax
- Lerche
- Leth
- Leuenbach
- Levetzow – Levetzau
- Lichtenberg
- Lilienschiold
- Linde
- Lindholm
- Linstow
- Lowzow
- Lütken
- Lüttichau
- Lützau –Lützow
- Løvenbalk
- Løvenfeldt
- Løwenhielm
- Løvenskiold
- Løvenstierne
- Løvensøn
- Løvenørn

M–N

- von Der Maase
- Michaelsen
- Moldrup
- Moltke
- Moltke-Bregentved
- Moth
- Munthe af Morgenstierne
- Münnich
- Mylius
- Neergaard
- Nutzhorn

O and Ø

- Obelitz
- Oldenburg
- Oppen-Schilden
- Den v. Ostenske Stiftelse
- Østergaard
- Oxholm

P

- Petersdorff
- Plessen-Scheel-Plessen
- Pogwisch

R

- Raben –Raben-Levetzau
- Ramstedt
- Rantzau
- Reedtz
- Reedtz-Thott
- Reventlow
- Roepstorff
- Rosenkrantz
- Rosenørn
- Rosenørn-Lehn
- Rosenvinge
- Ross
- Ræder

S

- Scavenius
- Schack-Schackenborg
- Schaffalitzky de Muckadell
- Scheel-Skeel
- Schimmelmann
- Schmettau von Schmidten
- Scholten
- Schulin-Schulin-Zeuthen
- Sehested
- Sèrène d’Acquèria
- Sperling
- Späth
- Sponneck
- Stampe
- Stemann
- Stibolt
- Stiernholm
- Stockfleth
- Svanenhielm
- Svanenskiold

T–U

- Teilmann
- Thurah
- Thygeson
- Tillisch
- Trampe
- Trolle-Wadenstierna
- Treschow
- Thott
- Undall
- Urne

V–Z

- Voss
- Wadenstierna
- Wardenburg
- Wedel
- Wedel-Heinen
- Wedell-Wedellsborg
- v. Westh
- Wichfeld
- Wilster
- Wind-Vind-Krag-Juel-Vind-Frijs
- Zeppelin
- Zytphen-Adeler
