= Trygve Ramberg =

Norwegian newspaper editor

Trygve Ramberg (1 March 1932 – 31 May 2002) was a Norwegian newspaper editor.

He was born in Lillehammer as a son of Birger Ramberg and Mathilde Fredriksen, and a brother of Knut Ramberg.

He finished his secondary education in 1950, and was hired as a journalistic apprentice in Gudbrandsdølen and Lillehammer Tilskuer in the same year. After studies in California he was hired in Aftenposten in 1955. After a short period as PR director of Esso-Raffineriet Norge from 1958 he returned to Aftenposten in 1960. Here he was promoted to news editor in 1970 and editor-in-chief in 1978. He left in 1986 to work nine years as the chief executive officer of Universitetsforlaget. According to his successor Terje Osmundsen, the publishing house had accumulated a 20 million kr deficit.

Ramberg also chaired the Norwegian Students' Society in 1958, the Norwegian Press Association from 1971 to 1975 and the Norwegian Broadcasting Corporation from 1990 to 1998. In the Norwegian Publishers' Association he became a board member in 1987, vice chair in 1989 and chair from 1993 to 1996 before he left the board in 1998. He was also a board member of the Norwegian Union of Journalists from 1964 to 1966, the Association of Norwegian Editors, the International Press Institute and the National Gallery of Norway. He was decorated as a Knight, First Class of the Order of St. Olav in 1997.

He died in 2002. He was married to Mona Lyche Ramberg, an accomplished translator and daughter of Karl and Ingeborg Lyche, who died in 2005. The couple had two sons. They resided in Bærum.

Media offices
Preceded by Reidar Lunde; Hans Vatne	Chief editor of Aftenposten; 1978–1986 (joint with Hans Vatne until 1984, Egil Sundar from 1984)	Succeeded by Egil Sundar
Preceded by Halvor Stenstadvold	Chair of the Norwegian Broadcasting Corporation; 1990–1998	Succeeded by Kåre Willoch
Preceded by Egil Alnæs	Chair of the National Gallery of Norway; 1990–1994	Succeeded by Jens Kristian Thune
