= Birgitte Christine Kaas =

Norwegian poet (1682–1761)

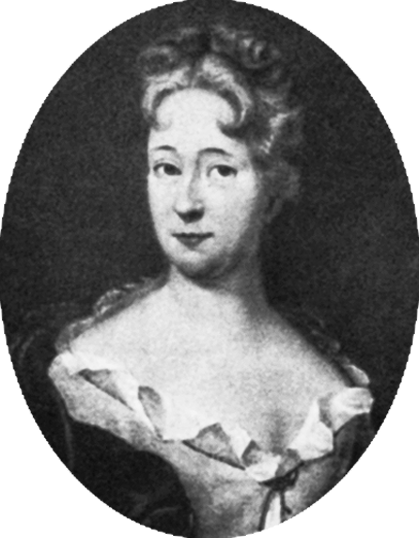
Birgitte Christine Kaas

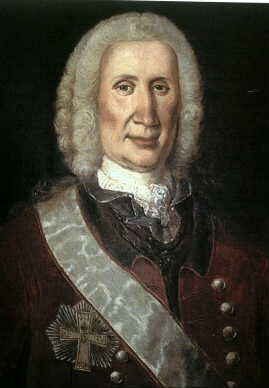
Her husband Henrik Jørgen Huitfeldt

Birgitte Christine Kaas, married Huitfeldt (2 October 1682 – 14 August 1761) was a Norwegian poet and translator of hymns.

== Biography ==
A member of the Danish noble Kaas family, she was the daughter of Hans Kaas (1640–1700), Governor of Christiania (now Oslo) and Trondheim and granddaughter of Jørgen Kaas, lord of the fiefdom Lister in Vest-Agder. She was the second wife of Lieutenant-General Henrik Jørgen Huitfeldt (1674–1751), a Danish war hero and member of the noble Huitfeldt family. They were the parents of three children. One of their descendants was the Norwegian historian Henrik Jørgen Huitfeldt-Kaas.

She and her husband owned several estates including Kjølberg Herregård on Onsoy. The family resided at Elingård Manor (Elingaard herregård) at Fredrikstad in Østfold, Norway. In 1733, King Christian VI visited accompanied by his mother-in-law, Sophie Christiane of Wolfstein. She encouraged Kaas to use her talents. The following year, she published the collection Nogle aandelige Psalmer. Overs. af det Tydske Sprog paa Dansk af den, Som inderlig begiærer at have udi sit Hierte Bestandig Christi Kierlighed, consisting of 28 translated hymns. Three of these are included in Norsk Salmebok. Most of her works, especially the non-religious poems, were lost when her house burned down in 1746.
