= Knut Ramberg =

Norwegian newspaper editor

Knut Ramberg (1919 – 2008) was a Norwegian newspaper editor.

He was born in Oslo as a brother of Trygve Ramberg. He was hired as an editor in United Press in 1945, and in 1950 he became foreign affairs editor in the Norwegian News Agency. His career pinnacle came as editor-in-chief of the "twin" newspapers Gudbrandsdølen and Lillehammer Tilskuer from 1954 to 1987. From 1977 to 1987 he also edited Samhold.
