= Jørgen Kaas =

Danish military officer (1618–1658)

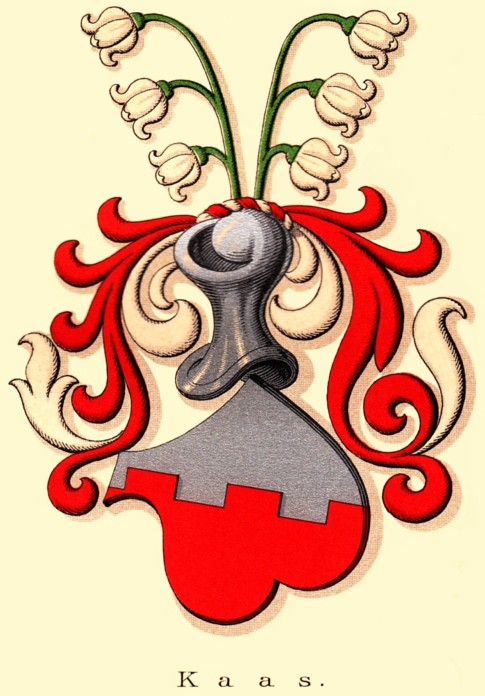
Coat of arms of the younger Kaas family

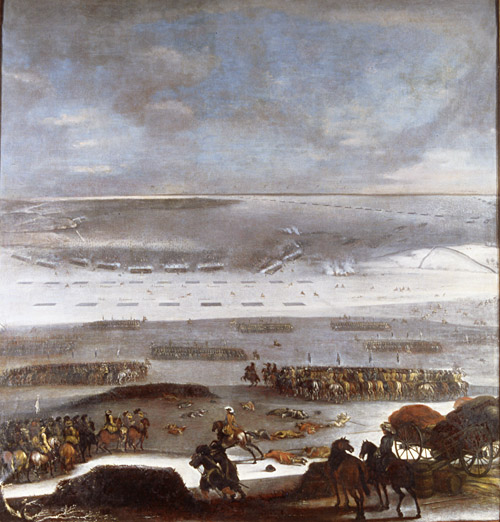
The March across the Belts in 1658

Jørgen Kaas (1618 – 30 January 1658 in Fyn) was a Danish colonel, lord of the fiefdom Lister in Norway, and owner of the Hastrup and Østergaard estates in Denmark. A member of the younger Kaas family (informally known as Mur-Kaas), one of Denmark's preeminent families of ancient high nobility, he is notable as a war hero during the March across the Belts when he led the defense of Fyn against the Swedes and fell in battle. King Charles X Gustav of Sweden accompanied his body on foot in honour of his bravery. He was given the fief of Lister by King Christian IV on 30 December 1648, after he had sold his estate Østergaard to the King's son Ulrik Christian Gyldenløve. He never resided in Norway, and the fief was administered by the fiefholder of Nedenes.

He was the son of judge Hans Kaas and Birgitte Norby, and was married to Karen Jørgensdatter Grubbe (born 1616 at Halsted Priory, died 1695 at Lerbæk), who was a granddaughter of Chancellor of Denmark Eiler Grubbe and a sister of Regitze Grubbe. He was thus a brother-in-law of the King's son Hans Ulrik Gyldenløve. Jørgen Kaas and Karen Grubbe were the parents of Governor of Christiania and Trondheim Hans Kaas (1640–1700) and Governor Jørgen Grubbe Kaas of Rydbjerggård (1643–1711), grandparents of Governor of Bergen and Admiral Ulrik Kaas (1677–1746) and General Henrik Bielke Kaas (1686–1773), and great-grandparents of the admirals Frederik Christian Kaas (1727–1804) and Ulrik Christian Kaas (1729–1808). Hans Kaas was the father of the poet Birgitte Christine Kaas (1682–1761), married to Henrik Jørgen Huitfeldt of Elingård. Their descendants include Henrik Jørgen Huitfeldt-Kaas. Jørgen Kaas is the progenitor of the Danish branch of the Kaas family. He also has descendants in Norway, in particular in the families Huitfeldt, Nissen and Paus.

Jørgen Kaas and Karen Grubbe were also great-great-great-grandparents of Countess Louise Sophie of Danneskiold-Samsøe (1796–1867), married to Christian August II, Duke of Schleswig-Holstein-Sonderburg-Augustenburg, a member of the royal House of Oldenburg. Their descendants include Augusta Victoria, German Empress, King Carl XVI Gustav of Sweden, King Constantine II of Greece, Queen Sofía of Spain, the current head of the House of Glücksburg Christoph, Prince of Schleswig-Holstein, the current head of the House of Hanover Prince Ernst August of Hanover and the current head of the House of Hohenzollern Georg Friedrich, Prince of Prussia.

== Literature ==
- Danmarks Adels Aarbog, 1917
