= Severin Andreas Heyerdahl =

Norwegian physician

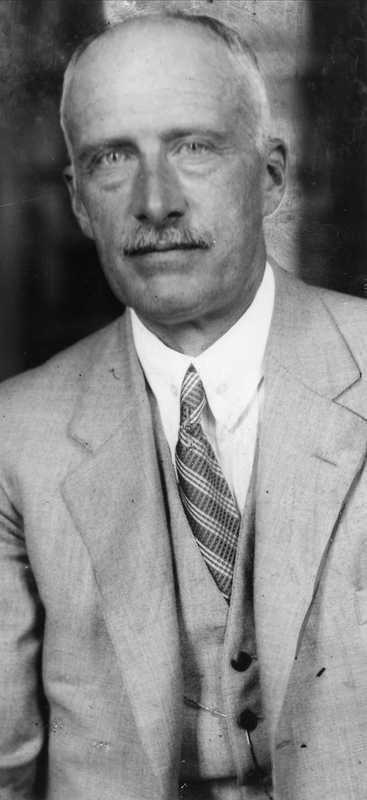
Severin Andreas Heyerdahl

Severin Andreas Heyerdahl (28 August 1870 – 26 June 1940) was a Norwegian physician, radiologist and hospital director. He was a pioneer in the use of radiology and radiation therapy in Norway.

== Biography ==
He was born in Kristiania (now Oslo), Norway. He was the son of Severin Andreas Heyerdahl (1818-75) and Ragna Møller (1832-1926). He took his examen artium at Aars og Voss skole in 1888. He was hired as the manager of the x-ray department at Rikshospitalet in 1899. He took his dr.med. degree at the University of Oslo in 1910.

Heyerdahl started with radium treatment at the Rikshospitalet in 1912. Together with Hans L. C. Huitfeldt, he co-founded the cancer treatment clinic Kristiania Radium-Institutt in 1913. From 1919 he was a senior doctor at the Rikshospitalet and a lecturer in radiology at the University of Oslo. He was instrumental in the establishment of the Norwegian Radium Hospital (Radiumhospitalet) in 1932. Heyerdahl served as chief physician from 1932 to 1938, and director from 1932 to 1939.
