= Hans Pedersson Paus =

Norwegian lawyer and government official

Hans Pedersson Paus (1721 – 1774) was a Norwegian lawyer and government official who served as governor and district judge—i.e. the region's foremost government official—of Upper Telemark from 1751 to 1774.

== Biography ==
He belonged to the Paus family and was the son of his predecessor Peder Hansson Paus (1691–1759), and Cathrine Medea Maj Hermansdatter (died 1736) from Denmark. He was the grandson of Hans Povelsson Paus and the great-grandson of the well-known Danish-Norwegian topographer Arent Berntsen and the Danish priest Søren Nielsen May. Hans Paus' grandmother, Gundel May, was a first cousin of statesman Peder Griffenfeld, Denmark–Norway's de facto ruler in the 1670s.

He graduated with a law degree from the University of Copenhagen in 1745, became an assistant judge serving under his father Peder Paus in Upper Telemark, and then succeeded his father as governor and district judge on 19 February 1751. His jurisdiction included Fyresdal, Lårdal, Vinje, Seljord, Kviteseid, Nissedal, and Hjartdal, with the office based in Kviteseid. He was the fifth and last in the line of "one of the most prominent judge dynasties" in Norway; when he died in 1774, the district judge office had been in the family's possession continuously for 106 years. In 1757, Hjartdal was transferred to Upper Telemark. Like his father, he was described as a diligent, considerate, and righteous district judge who distinguished himself with good and independent legal judgments that emphasized common sense and knowledge of human nature.

Hans Paus was married to Andrea Jaspara Nissen (1725–1772) from Denmark, daughter of infantry captain Nicolai von Nissen and a descendant of the Danish war hero Jørgen Kaas. His father-in-law was the brother of the governor of St. Croix, Gregers Høeg Nissen.
