= Lødrup =

Lødrup is a Norwegian surname. Notable people with the surname include:

- Hans Peter Elisa Lødrup (1885–1955), Norwegian journalist, newspaper editor, non-fiction writer, and politician
- Peter Lødrup (1932–2010), Norwegian legal scholar and judge
