= J. C. Hyldahl =

Danish merchant

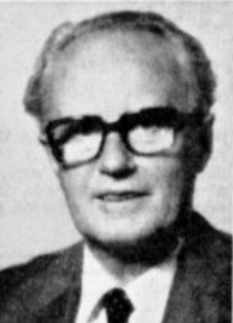
- Photo of J.C. Hyldahl
- Born: Jens Christian Hyldahl; August 21, 1911; Aarhus, Denmark
- Died: December 23, 2003 (aged 92)
- Occupation: Merchant
- Known for: Major textile and apparel merchant in Denmark

Jens Christian Hyldahl (21 August 1911 – 23 December 2003) was a Danish merchant who operated a number of businesses in Aarhus. For more than 40 years, Hyldahl had a store at Store Torv Number 7. The store included children's, men's, and women's clothing, and Hyldahl was known as one of the most successful textile and apparel merchants in the industry, and was described as one of Denmark’s wealthiest merchants.

His store at Store Torv 7 did not close until 1996, when, at the age of 85, Hyldahl was still personally working as the owner of the store. For a number of years, Hyldahl was a member of the parish council of Risskov Church and also served on the main board of Jydsk Børneforsorg.

== Family ==
J.C. Hyldahl was married to Anne Elisabeth Dahl, whose family lineage traced back to the noble Fredberg family. Together, they had four children: Anne Charlotte, Vibeke, Thorkild, and Britta. Their son, Thorkild Hyldahl, later continued the family business and, in 1980, took over the operation of the wholesale company together with J.C. Hyldahl’s nephew.

== Career ==
=== Textile and apparel trade ===
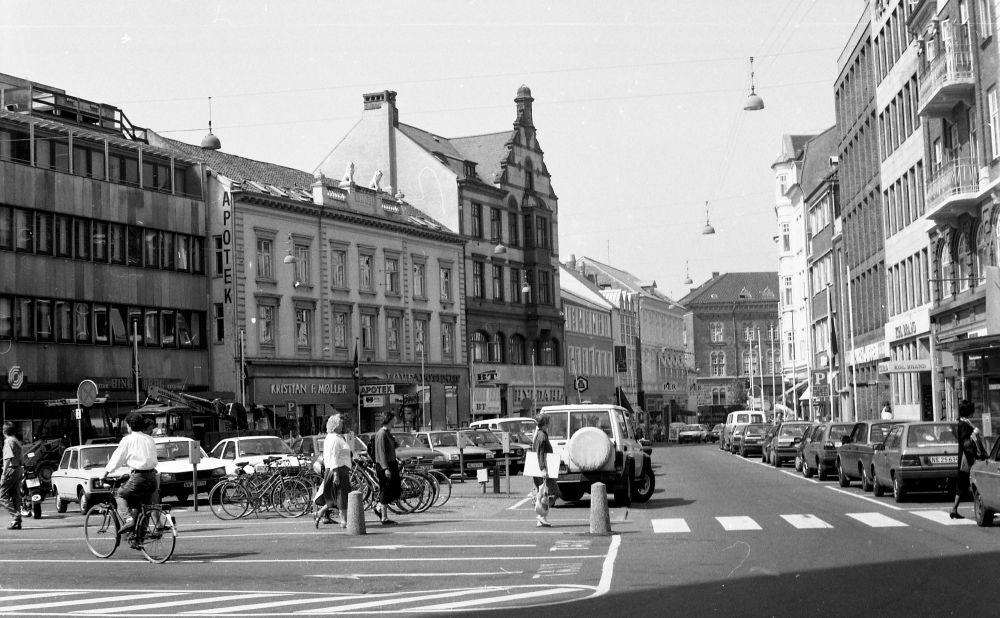
Hyldahl's store at Store Torv 7

The starting point for J.C. Hyldahl was the knitwear store he established in modest premises at Immervad 5 in 1944, during the German occupation of Denmark.

In 1952, the store moved to significantly larger premises at Store Torv 7. Here, Hyldahl was located alongside royal warrant holders such as bookseller Kristian F. Møller, goldsmith Hingelberg, and florist Abel. In 1952, as a result of his success as a merchant, J.C. Hyldahl also opened a store on Silkeborgvej in the Aarhus suburb of Åbyhøj.

=== Wholesale company ===
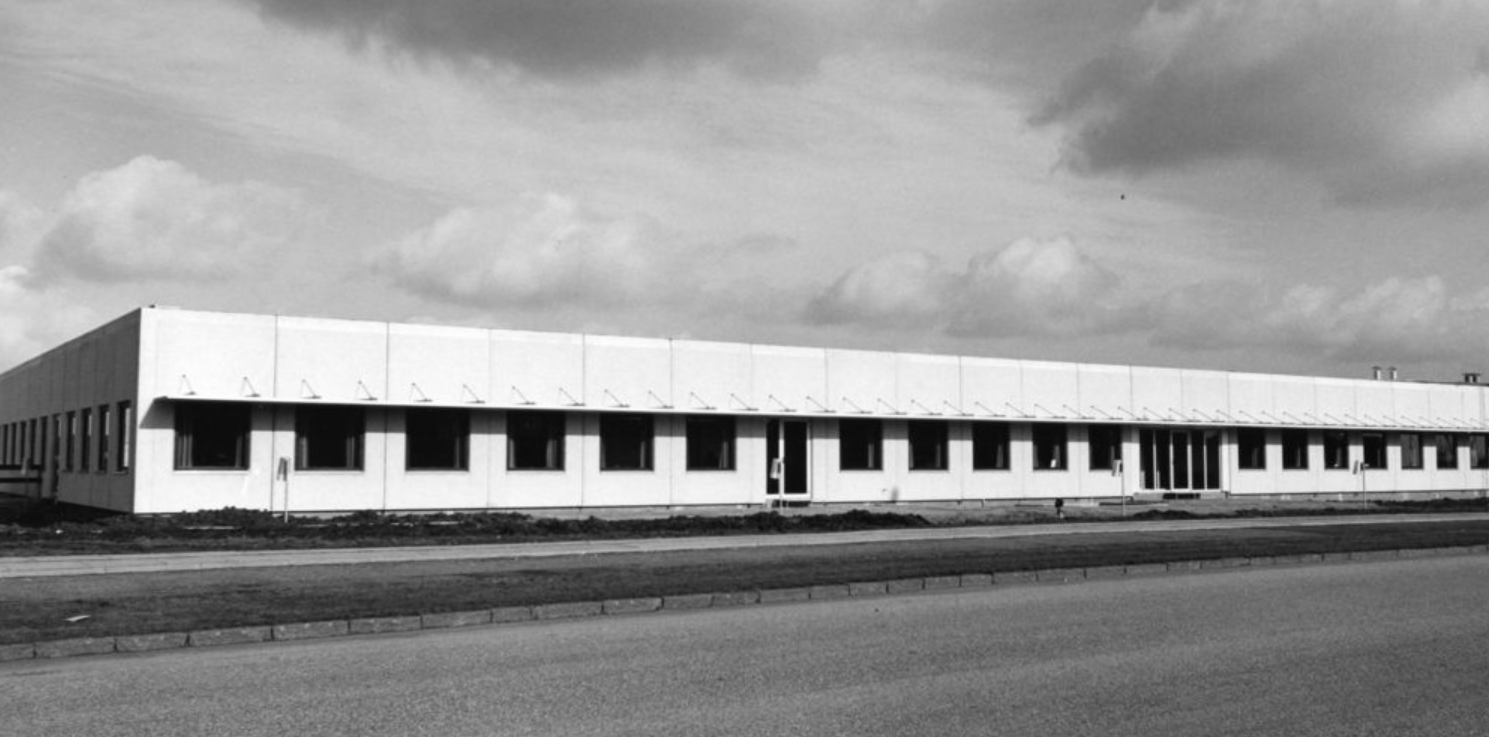
Hyldahl's factory on Sindalsvej

In 1952, J.C. Hyldahl took over a small German agency in Vesterport, which later developed into a large wholesale company. For this company, a new factory was built on Sindalsvej in 1973, where buttons, ribbons, buckles, zippers, thread, and other items for the clothing industry were sold.

The company was transferred in 1980 to his son, Thorkild Hyldahl, and J.C. Hyldahl's nephew, who subsequently operated the business together. The wholesale company still has premises on Sindalsvej today, with offices in Hong Kong, China, Bangladesh, and Poland. The primary factory is now located in Wenzhou, China.

In 1973, J.C. Hyldahl purchased the dress warehouse at Store Torv No. 6, 1st floor, and operated a business at this address for a number of years. The warehouse was later merged with the store at Store Torv 7. Following the closure of Stjerne Magasinet in 1978, Hyldahl took over the store's accounting system. He also opened a store in Ikast; this was later sold.
