= Torolv Kandahl =

Norwegian politician (1899–1982)

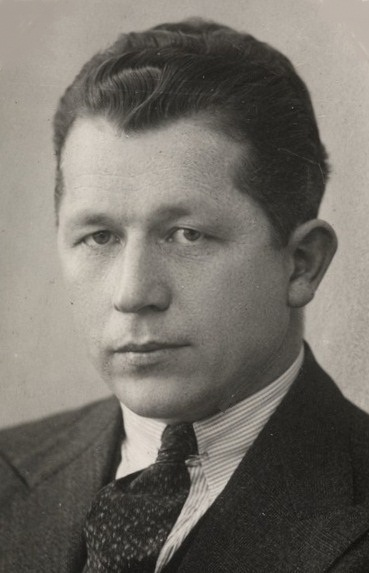
Torolv Kandahl

Torolv Kandahl (17 August 1899 – 5 March 1982) was a Norwegian newspaper editor and Member of Parliament with the Conservative Party.

== Biography ==
He was born at Austad in Lyngdal Municipality, Lister og Mandal county, Norway. He was the son of Tor Mathias Kandahl (1876-1955) and Sanna Mathilde Torjesen (1877-1969). His father was a school teacher and manager of the local telephone exchange.

In 1918, Kandahl received his first job as a journalist in Tønsbergs Blad. In 1919, he went to Morgenbladet, where he was a political journalist until 1922. He obtained his degree in law degree in 1926. In 1928, he was appointed an editor of Aftenposten. Kandahl was chairman of the Norwegian Press Association from 1938. During the Occupation of Norway by Germany, he was deprived of his positions by the occupational power. From 1942-45, he was the head of the Norwegian Government's information office in New York City. After the liberation of Norway, he was chief editor at Drammens Tidende from 1945-61. Kandahl was chairman of the Norwegian Editorial Society 1950-56 and from 1961-63 he was a board member of the International Press Institute in Zurich. From 1961-70, he was at Aftenposten.

Kandahl was a member of the municipal council of Aker Municipality from 1934 to 1939, and then served as deputy mayor in the period 1939–1940. He was elected to the Parliament of Norway from Buskerud in 1950, but was not re-elected in 1954. He later served in the position of deputy representative during the term 1958–1961. Kandahl was nominated as a knight of the 1st grade of Order of St. Olav in 1960, and was awarded the Command Cross in 1975. He was the holder of an honorary doctorate (1966) from Luther College in Decorah, Iowa.

Media offices
Preceded by Johannes Nesse	Chairman of the Norwegian Press Association; 1938–1946 (in exile 1941–1945)	Succeeded by Olav Larssen
Preceded by Herman Smitt-Ingebrigtsen; Einar Diesen; Henrik J. S. Huitfeldt	Chief editor of Aftenposten; 1961–1970 (joint with Einar Diesen until 1968, and Henrik J. S. Huitfeldt throughout the period)	Succeeded by Hans Vatne; Reidar Lunde
