= Hans Vatne =

Norwegian newspaper editor

Hans Vatne (28 February 1923 – 10 October 1985) was a Norwegian newspaper editor.

He was born in Halden. He was hired in Morgenbladet in 1946 and Aftenposten in 1950. From 1953 to 1964 he was a subeditor in Morgenposten, but he then returned to Aftenposten in 1964. Here he was promoted to political editor in 1968 and editor-in-chief in 1970. He retired in 1984 and died the following year.

Vatne was also a board member of the Norwegian Press Association from 1957 to 1963 and a member of the Norwegian Press Complaints Commission from 1961 to 1964.

Media offices
Preceded by Henrik J. S. Huitfeldt; Torolv Kandahl	Chief editor of Aftenposten; 1970–1984 (joint with Henrik J. S. Huitfeldt until 1973, Reidar Lunde until 1978, Trygve Ramberg from 1978)	Succeeded by Trygve Ramberg; Egil Sundar
