= Dagningen =

Norwegian newspaper

Dagningen was a Norwegian newspaper, published in Lillehammer in Oppland county.

== History and profile ==
Dagningen was started in 1924. The paper was affiliated with the Labour Party. It had its headquarters in Lillehammer.

In 1997 the paper merged with the Centre Party newspaper Gudbrandsdølen Lillehammer Tilskuer— itself a 1990 merger between Gudbrandsdølen and Lillehammer Tilskuer—to form Gudbrandsdølen Dagningen (GD).
