= Johannes Nesse =

Norwegian newspaper editor

Johannes Jeremias Nesse (26 September 1891 – 1 June 1948), often abbreviated in Norwegian as Johs. Nesse, was a Norwegian newspaper editor.

He became an editor in Aftenposten in 1928, and was promoted to editor-in-chief in 1930. In 1941, following the milk strike, Nesse was promptly fired together with Torolv Kandahl by the occupying Nazi authorities, who had taken control over Aftenposten. He was replaced by Henry Endsjø. He was imprisoned at Møllergata 19 from 12 September to 24 September 1941. He was reinstated after the Second World War in 1945 and remained editor-in-chief until his death.

Media offices
| Preceded by Knut Domaas | Chairman of the Norwegian Press Association; 1936–1937 | Succeeded by Torolv Kandahl |
