= Kaas (noble family) =

Kaas Sparre-Kaas Mur-Kaas
- Uradel
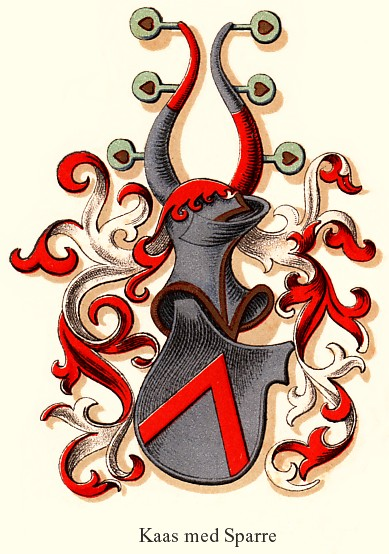
- Coat of arms of the elder Kaas family, drawn by Anders Thiset in Danmarks Adels Aarbog

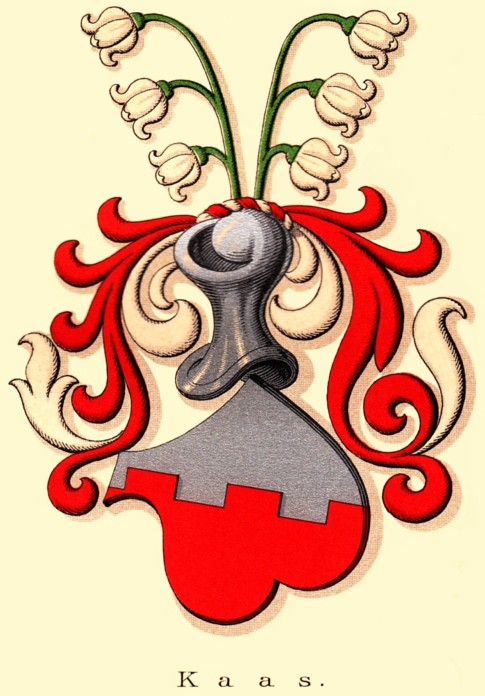
- Coat of arms of the younger Kaas family, drawn by Anders Thiset in Danmarks Adels Aarbog
- Parent family: Reventlow (younger Kaas, proposed)
- Country: Denmark; Norway
- Place of origin: Jutland
- Founded: Time immemorial
- Founder: Niels (elder Kaas)
- Titles: Knight
- Dissolution: 1799 (elder Kaas)
- Cadet branches: Huitfeldt; Nissen; Paus

Kaas is the name of two related Danish noble families from Jutland, which were and are, respectively, two of the preeminent families of the Danish Uradel or ancient high nobility, which were represented in the Council of the Realm. They are known as the elder Kaas family and the younger Kaas family or named for their respective coats of arms (Sparre-Kaas and Mur-Kaas). Both families appeared in the Middle Ages, and they have been noble since time immemorial. Like all old noble families in Scandinavia, the families are untitled, although individual members in the past held the rank of knight, traditionally the highest rank of Scandinavian nobility and reserved for important statesmen, but always of a non-hereditary nature.

== History ==
The elder family is descended from the knight Niels (born 1292). The elder family became extinct in 1799, while the younger family descends, through intermarriage in the late 15th century, from this family. The paternal ancestors of the younger family were also noble, but did not have a family name prior to the late 15th century, when they adopted the Kaas name from their mother's family. Nevertheless, the two families used different arms. The arms of the younger Kaas family is identical to that of the Reventlow family; for this reason it has been argued that the family is descended from the Reventlow family in the male line.

Several members of both families were represented in the Danish Council of the Realm, and statesman Niels Kaas of the elder family was head of the Dano-Norwegian government during the King's minority in the late 16th century, and as such the de facto ruler of Denmark-Norway. Other family members were fiefholders or high-ranking military officers.

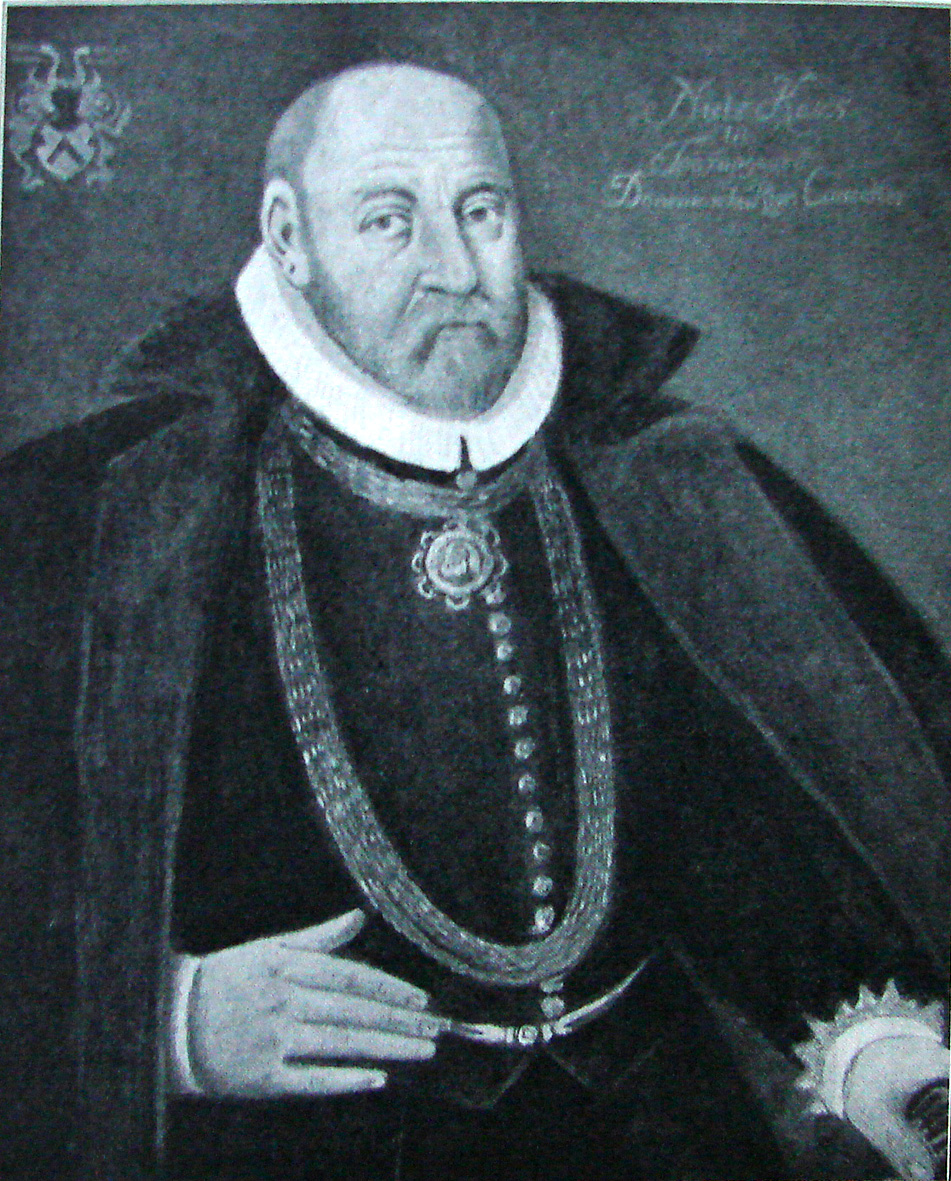
Statesman Niels Kaas (Sparre-Kaas), Chancellor and head of the Dano-Norwegian government during the King's minority 1588–1594

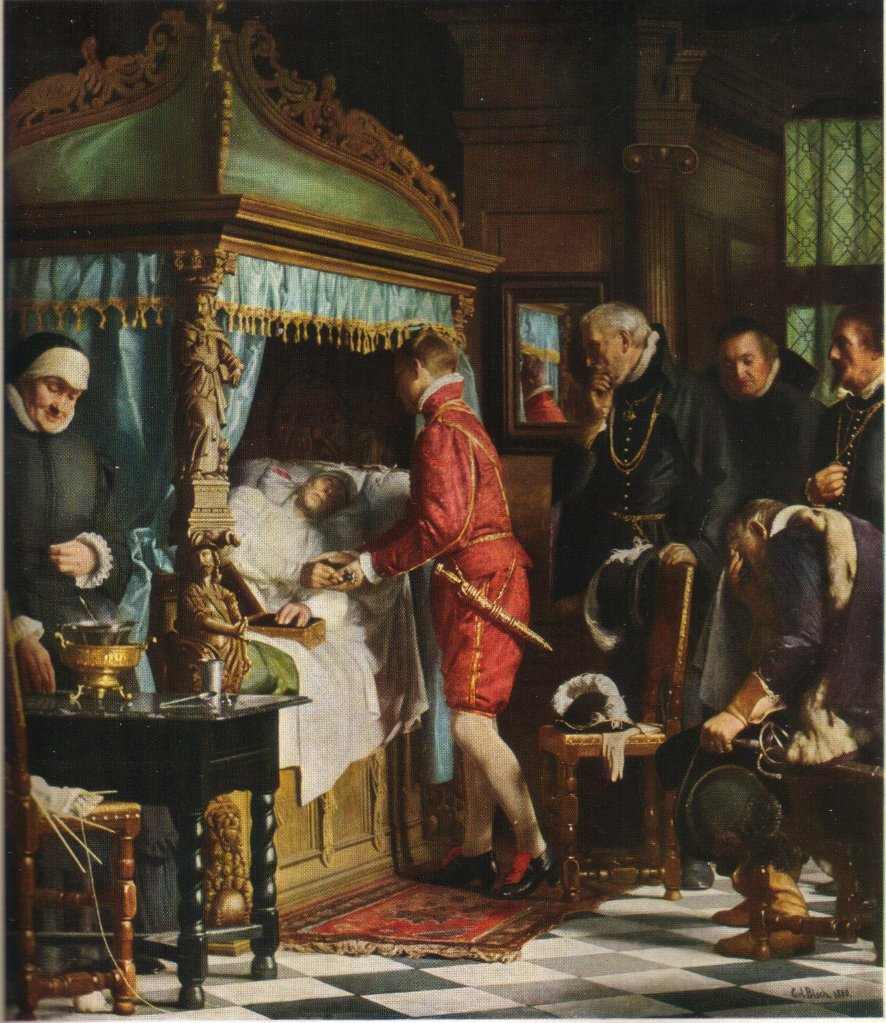
The painting On the deathbed of Niels Kaas shows King Christian IV receiving the keys of government and the final words of advice from Niels Kaas, the de facto ruler during the King's minority

=== Descendants of Jørgen Kaas ===
The current Danish family branch is descended from fiefholder Jørgen Kaas (1618–1658), whose descendants include Governor of Christiania and Trondheim Hans Kaas (1640–1700), Governor Jørgen Grubbe Kaas (1643–1711), Governor of Bergen and Admiral Ulrik Kaas (1677–1746), General Henrik Bielke Kaas (1686–1773), Admiral Frederik Christian Kaas (1727–1804) and Admiral Ulrik Christian Kaas (1729 - 1808). Other descendants of Jørgen Kaas are found in Norway, in particular in the families Huitfeldt, Nissen and Paus. Among Jørgen Kaas' descendants are also members of several royal houses, including Augusta Victoria, German Empress, King Carl XVI Gustav of Sweden, King Constantine II of Greece, Queen Sofía of Spain, the previous head of the House of Glücksburg Christoph, Prince of Schleswig-Holstein, the current head of the House of Hanover Prince Ernst August of Hanover and the current head of the House of Hohenzollern Georg Friedrich, Prince of Prussia.

=== Munthe-Kaas ===
A Norwegian branch, Munthe-Kaas, is descended from premier lieutenant Hartvig Kaas (1695–1759). His grandson, goldsmith in Christiania Ahasverus Kaas (1781–1859) applied for permission to change his name to Munthe-Kaas in 1848; however he was not himself descended from the Norwegian Munthe family.

The last common (patrilineal) ancestor of the extant Danish Kaas family and this Norwegian branch was Erich Mogensen (Kaas) (ca. 1500–1556). The Norwegian Kaas family did not own substantial land or achieve high rank in Norway; its members lived mainly as farmers, NCOs and junior military officers before the 19th century. The family did not petition the Storting for recognition of its noble status in 1821 when the Nobility Act abolished the noble privileges in Norway.

== Other sources ==
- Anders Thiset og P.L. Wittrup: Nyt dansk Adelsleksikon, Copenhagen 1904
- Sven Tito Achen: Danske adelsvåbener, Copenhagen 1973
- Danmarks Adels Aarbog 1917
