= Oslo University Hospital, Radiumhospitalet =

- Oslo University Hospital
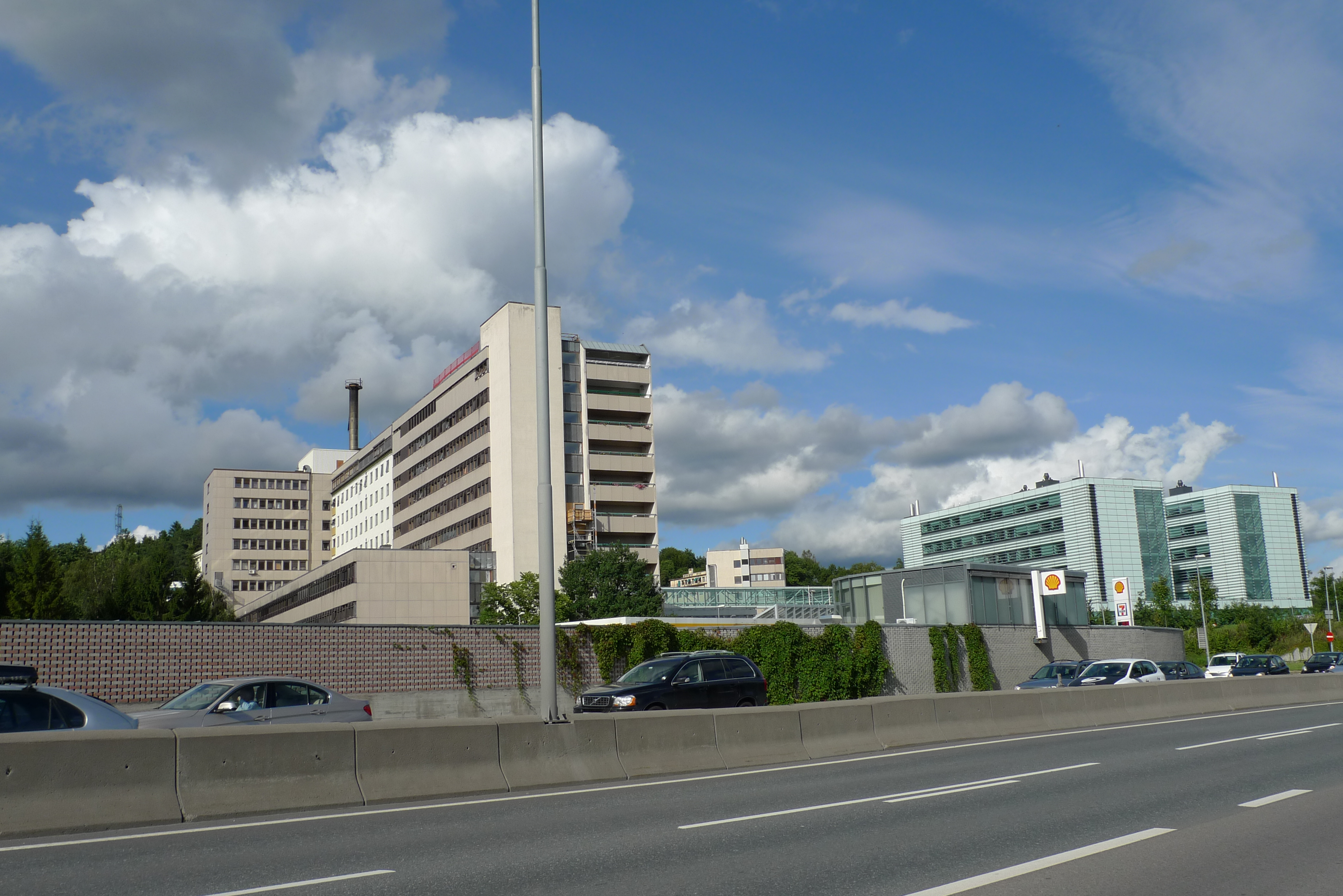
- Norwegian Radium Hospital

Geography
- Location: Montebello, Norway
- Coordinates: 59°55′51.04″N 10°39′39.81″E

Organisation
- Type: Specialist

Services
- Speciality: Oncology

History
- Opened: May 21, 1932

Links
- Lists: Hospitals in Norway

Oslo University Hospital, Radiumhospitalet (Norwegian: Oslo universitetssykehus, Radiumhospitalet) is one of the four campuses of Oslo University Hospital in Oslo, Norway, and is dedicated to cancer treatment. This part of the hospital is the most specialized hospital in Norway for cancer therapy and research on cancer. The Norwegian Radium Hospital was an independent hospital from May 21, 1932, to 2005, when it merged with Rikshospitalet. The hospital was founded with Severin Andreas Heyerdahl as chief physician and director, and Hans L. C. Huitfeldt as chairman of the board. From 1983 to the merger with Rikshospitalet in 2005 Jan Vincents Johannessen was CEO.

The Radium Hospital merged in 2005 with Rikshospitalet to create Rikshospitalet-Radiumhospitalet HF. On January 1, 2009, Rikshospitalet merged with Ullevål University Hospital and Aker University Hospital to create Oslo University Hospital.
