= Reidar Lunde =

Norwegian newspaper editor

Karl Reidar Lunde (23 April 1911 – 19 September 1982) was a Norwegian newspaper editor.

He was born in Oslo and took the cand.jur. degree in 1934. He was hired in Aftenposten in 1935. Here he was promoted to news editor in 1964 and editor-in-chief in 1970. He retired in 1978.

Media offices
Preceded by Henrik J. S. Huitfeldt; Torolv Kandahl	Chief editor of Aftenposten; 1970–1978 (joint with Henrik J. S. Huitfeldt until 1973, Hans Vatne throughout the period)	Succeeded by Hans Vatne; Trygve Ramberg
