= Laagen =

1923-1945 Norwegian newspaper

Laagen was a Norwegian newspaper, published in Lillehammer in Oppland county.

It started on 18 September 1923 as the organ of the Norwegian Agrarian Association. The agrarians were not adequately satisfied with the existing newspaper Gudbrandsdølen. Laagen, named after the nearby river, was published daily from 1 October 1924. In 1928 it opened a correspondent office at Otta.

Editor-in-chief throughout its existence was Ivar Høvik, and chairman was Erling Bjørnson. Bjørnson eventually shifted party allegiance from Agrarian to Nasjonal Samling, and imposed his views on the newspaper. During the occupation of Norway by Nazi Germany from 1940, Høvik decided to follow suit and join the NS party, even though he did not write national socialist editorials. Some employees in the newspaper participated in resistance work. Bjørnson—and Høvik—decided to give up on 7 May 1945, and subeditor Sigurd Skogheim edited Laagen on its last day of existence, 8 May 1945. The occupation was over, and the victorious Home Front decided to liquidate Laagen with immediate effect.
