= Svanenhielm (noble family) =

- Nobility
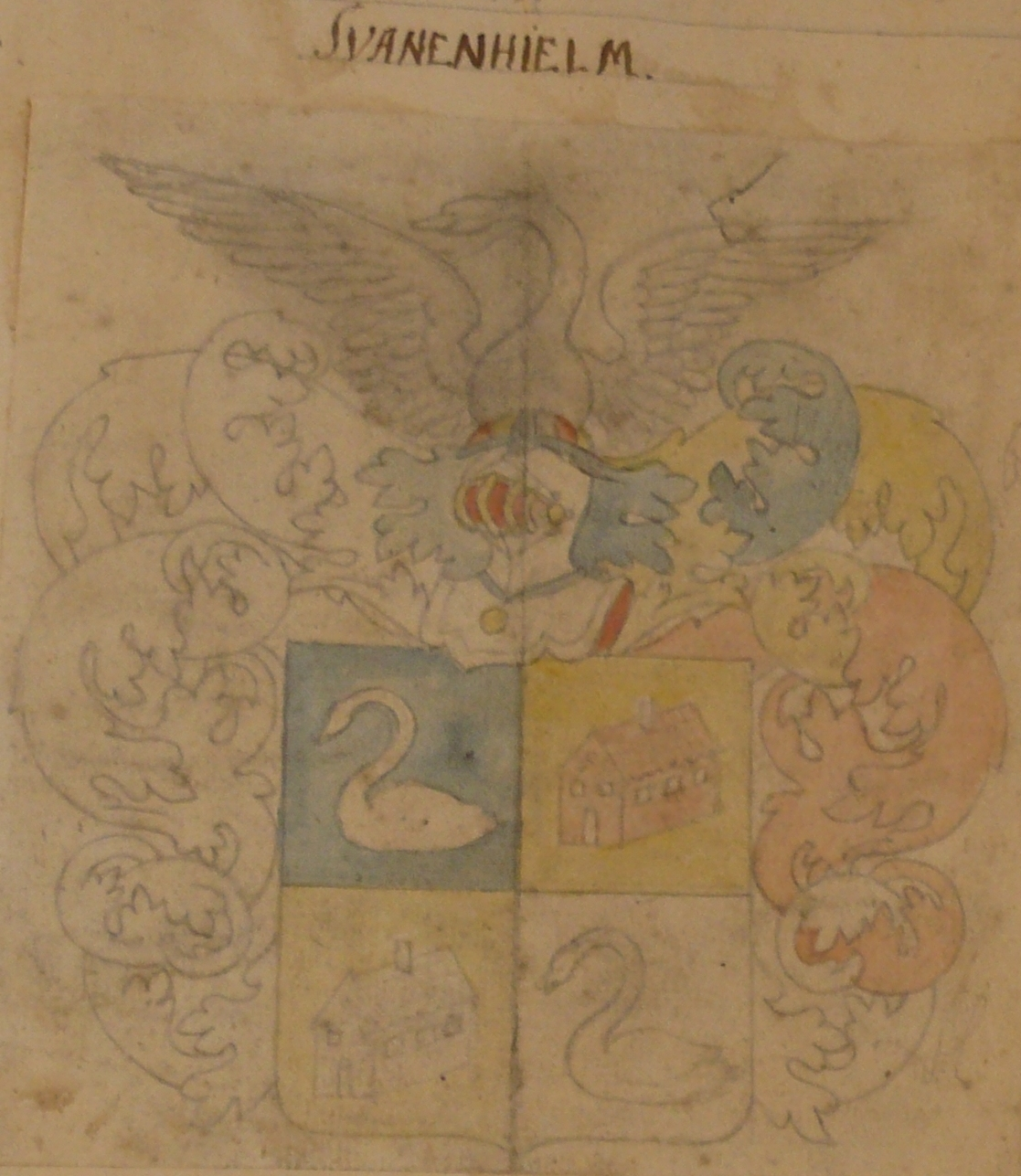
- The coat of arms of Severin Seehusen Svanenhielm.
- Country: Denmark; Norway
- Place of origin: Bredstedt
- Founded: 1720 (ennoblement)
- Founder: Morten Hansen Seehuusen
- Estates: Damsgård Manor; Svanøy Manor; Arnegård

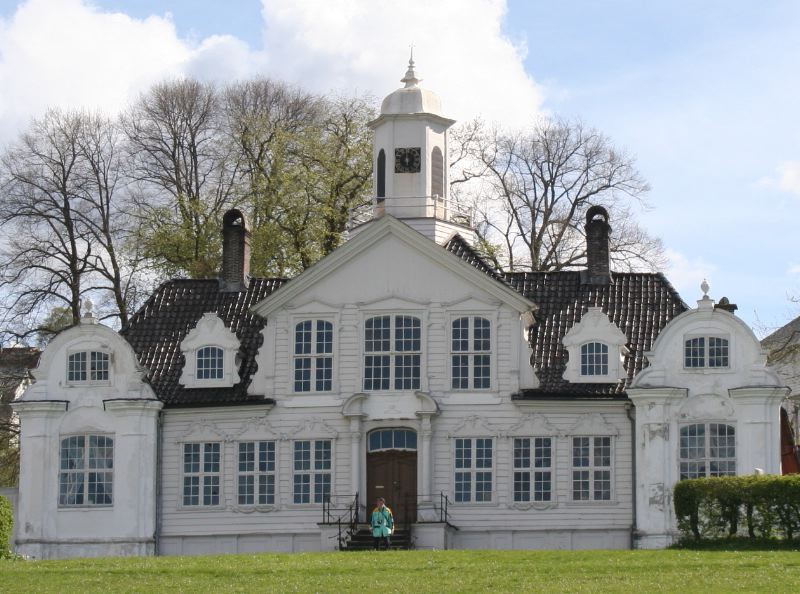
Damsgård Manor

The Svanenhielm family was a family of Danish and Norwegian nobility.

== History ==
Morten Hansen Seehuusen (1629–1694) was a merchant from Bredstedt in Schleswig-Holstein who re-located to Stavanger, Norway. His son, Severin Seehusen, (1664–1726) was an official in Bergen as well as in Stavanger and Northern Norway. He owned, among other properties, Damsgård Manor (Damsgård hovedgård) outside Bergen, Svanøy (Svanøy hovudgard) in Sunnfjord and Arnegård in Stavanger. Severin Seehausen was in 1720 ennobled under the name Svanenhielm (lit. Swan Helm), which he had adopted after buying the Svanøy Estate in 1719.

== See also ==
- Danish nobility
- Norwegian nobility
