= Henrik Jørgen Huitfeldt-Kaas =

Norwegian historian (1834–1905)

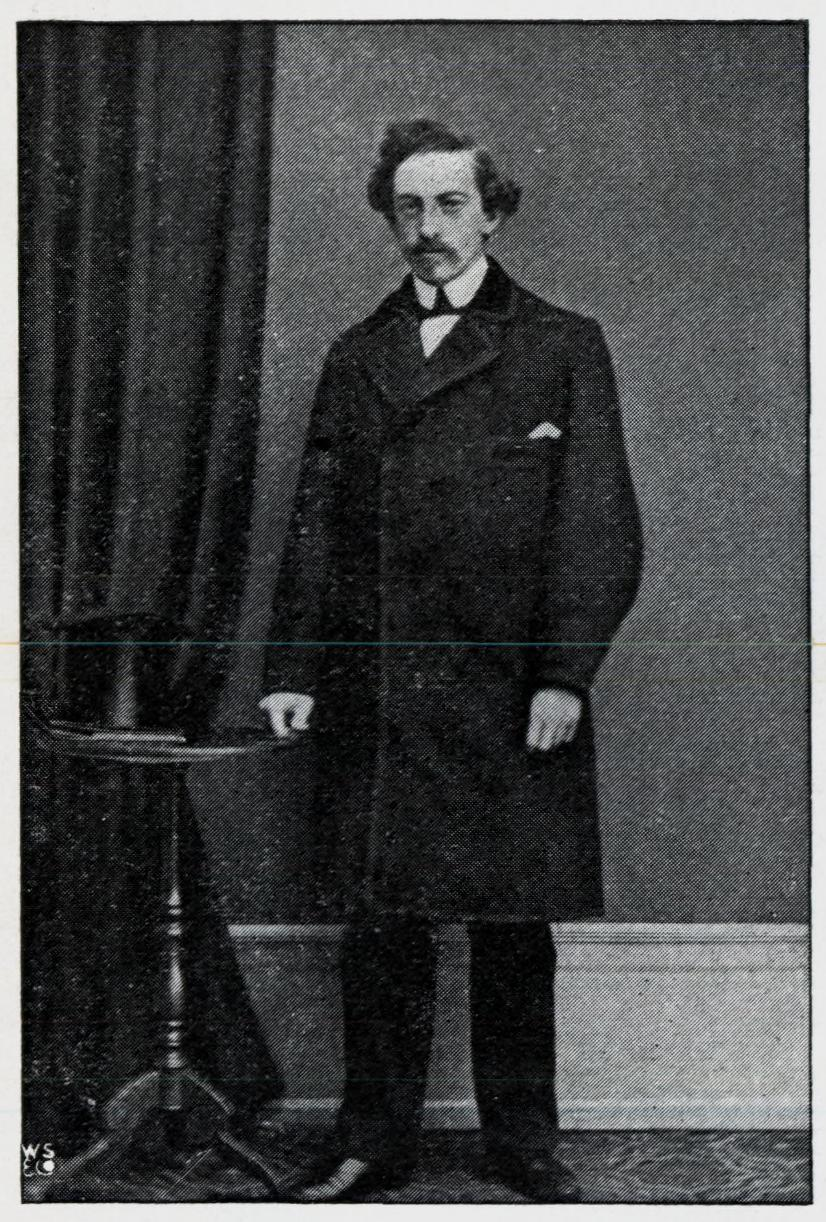
- Henrik Jørgen Huitfeldt-Kaas (1862)
- Born: 2 February 1834; Christiania (now Oslo), Norway
- Died: 18 May 1905 (aged 71)
- Occupations: Historian, Director-General of the National Archives of Norway
- Notable work: Diplomatarium Norvegicum, Norske Sigiller fra Middelalderen

Henrik Jørgen Huitfeldt-Kaas (2 February 1834 – 18 May 1905) was a Norwegian historian and Director-General of the National Archives of Norway (riksarkivar).

Huitfeldt-Kaas was born in Christiania (now Oslo). He was a member of the Danish noble families Huitfeldt and Kaas. He was descended from Lieutenant-General Henrik Jørgen Huitfeldt and Birgitte Christine Kaas. Originally named Henrik Jørgen Huitfeldt, he adopted the name Huitfeldt-Kaas in 1881 when he gained an inheritance from Det Classenske Fideicommis, a charitable foundation which was founded by Danish industrialist and Major General Johan Frederik Classen who had died in 1792. Professionally, he was commonly known as H.J. Huitfeldt-Kaas.

Huitfeldt-Kaas attended the Royal Frederick University (now the University of Oslo). He was employed at the National Archives of Norway in 1858 and served several times as acting head before being formally appointed in 1896. Huitfeldt-Kaas published several works on Norwegian history, including several volumes of Diplomatarium Norvegicum. He was also interested in genealogy (particularly noble genealogy), heraldry, sigillography and biographical history. He started the work Norske Sigiller fra Middelalderen (1899–1950).
