= Adeler =

Adeler is a surname. Notable people with the surname include:

- Cort Adeler (1622–1675), Norwegian seaman
- Frederik Adeler (Danish nobleman) (1764–1816), Dano-Norwegian noble and government official
- Frederik Adeler (1700–1766), Danish government official and landowner
- Frederik Christian Adeler (1668–1726), Danish courtier and county governor
- Frederik Georg Adeler (1736–1810), Danish-Norwegian county official and landowner
- Henrik Adeler (1660–1718), Norwegian civil servant and politician
- Sivert Adeler (1647–1683), Danish captain and colonial administrator

== See also ==
- Adler (surname)
