= Hans Peter Elisa Lødrup =

Norwegian politician and writer

- Born: 26 April 1885; Skien, Norway
- Died: 25 January 1955 (aged 69)
- Education: Jurist
- Occupations: Journalist and politician
- Political party: Conservative Party
- Relatives: Johan H. Andresen (brother-in-law)

Hans Peter Elisa Lødrup (26 April 1885 – 25 January 1955) was a Norwegian journalist, newspaper editor, non-fiction writer and politician for the Conservative Party. He edited the newspaper Lillehammer Tilskuer for ten years, wrote a biography of sculptor Gustav Vigeland, and wrote a book on the 1940 Battle of Vinjesvingen.

== Career ==
After graduating as cand.jur. in 1908, Lødrup worked for the newspaper Morgenbladet from 1909 to 1911. He edited the periodical Riksmaalsbladet from 1912 to 1916, was a journalist in Aftenposten for many years, and edited the newspaper Lillehammer Tilskuer from 1930 to 1940. Among his publications is a biography of Gustav Vigeland from 1944, and the book Vinjesvingen from 1945, treating the Battle of Vinjesvingen and the Norwegian Campaign in Telemark in 1940.

He was a member of the Oslo City Council from 1926 to 1930, and was elected deputy member of the Storting for the period 1945 to 1949, representing the Market towns of Hedmark and Oppland counties. He met during 10 days of parliamentary session.

He was a board member of the Norwegian News Agency, and chairman of Lillehammer branch of the Norwegian Trekking Association.

== Personal life ==
Lødrup was born in Skien on 26 April 1885. He was a son of principal Theodor Henrik Lødrup and Elisabeth Concordia Hansen. He married Cecilie Catharina Andresen in 1926; and was thus a brother-in-law of factory owner Johan H. Andresen, who was member of the Storting 1928–1933 and chairman of the Conservative Party 1934–1937.

Lødrup died on 25 January 1955.
