= Henrik Jørgen Schibsted Huitfeldt =

Norwegian newspaper editor (1907–1979)

Henrik Jørgen Schibsted Huitfeldt (8 January 1907 – 1979) was a Norwegian newspaper editor.

== Personal life ==
He was born in Kristiania as a son of physician Hans L. C. Huitfeldt (1876–1969) and Gudrun Schibsted (1881–1966). He was a paternal grandson of Henrik Jørgen Huitfeldt-Kaas and maternal grandson of Amandus Schibsted.

In 1935 he married Sofie Helene Wigert, but the marriage was dissolved. In 1949 he married Anita Wimmer.

== Career ==
He finished his secondary education in 1926 and took economics at Oxford University in 1929. He was hired in Aftenposten in 1930. Here he was promoted to subeditor in 1935 and editor-in-chief in 1945. He retired in 1973.

During the occupation of Norway by Nazi Germany, Huitfeldt was imprisoned by the Nazi authorities and held in Grini concentration camp from 13 January to 24 December 1942.

He was decorated as an Officer of the Order of Orange-Nassau. He died in 1979.

Media offices
Preceded by Henry E. Endsjø	Chief editor of Aftenposten; 1945–1973 (joint with six other people interchangeably)	Succeeded by Hans Vatne; Reidar Lunde
