= Hans L. C. Huitfeldt =

Norwegian physician (1876–1969)

Hans Ludvig Carl Huitfeldt (17 February 1876 – 30 June 1969) was a Norwegian physician.

He graduated as cand.med. in 1902, and later took the dr.med. degree. He worked in Gjøvik from 1902 to 1904, and thereafter in Oslo, running a private clinic from 1908 to 1940. He founded the cancer treatment clinic Kristiania Radium-Institutt in 1912, and was later instrumental in the foundation of the Norwegian Radium Hospital. From its foundation in 1932 to 1956 he chaired the board of directors. Huitfeldt was also physician-in-ordinary of the Norwegian royal family. During the German occupation of Norway, the royal family was chased into exile, while Huitfeldt was imprisoned at Grini between January and June 1942.

Huitfeldt was a Knight of the Order of St. Olav and the Swedish Order of the Polar Star.

He was the son of Henrik Jørgen Huitfeldt-Kaas, son-in-law of newspaper editor Amandus Schibsted. and father of Henrik J. S. Huitfeldt.
