= Gudbrandsdølen Dagningen =

Norwegian newspaper

Gudbrandsdølen Dagningen is a Norwegian newspaper, published in Lillehammer in Innlandet county.

It was formed by the merger of the Centre Party newspaper Gudbrandsdølen and the Labour Party-affiliated Dagningen in 1990.
