= Gyldenfeldt House =

Building in Copenhagen

Gyldenfeldts House
- Gyldenfeldts Gård
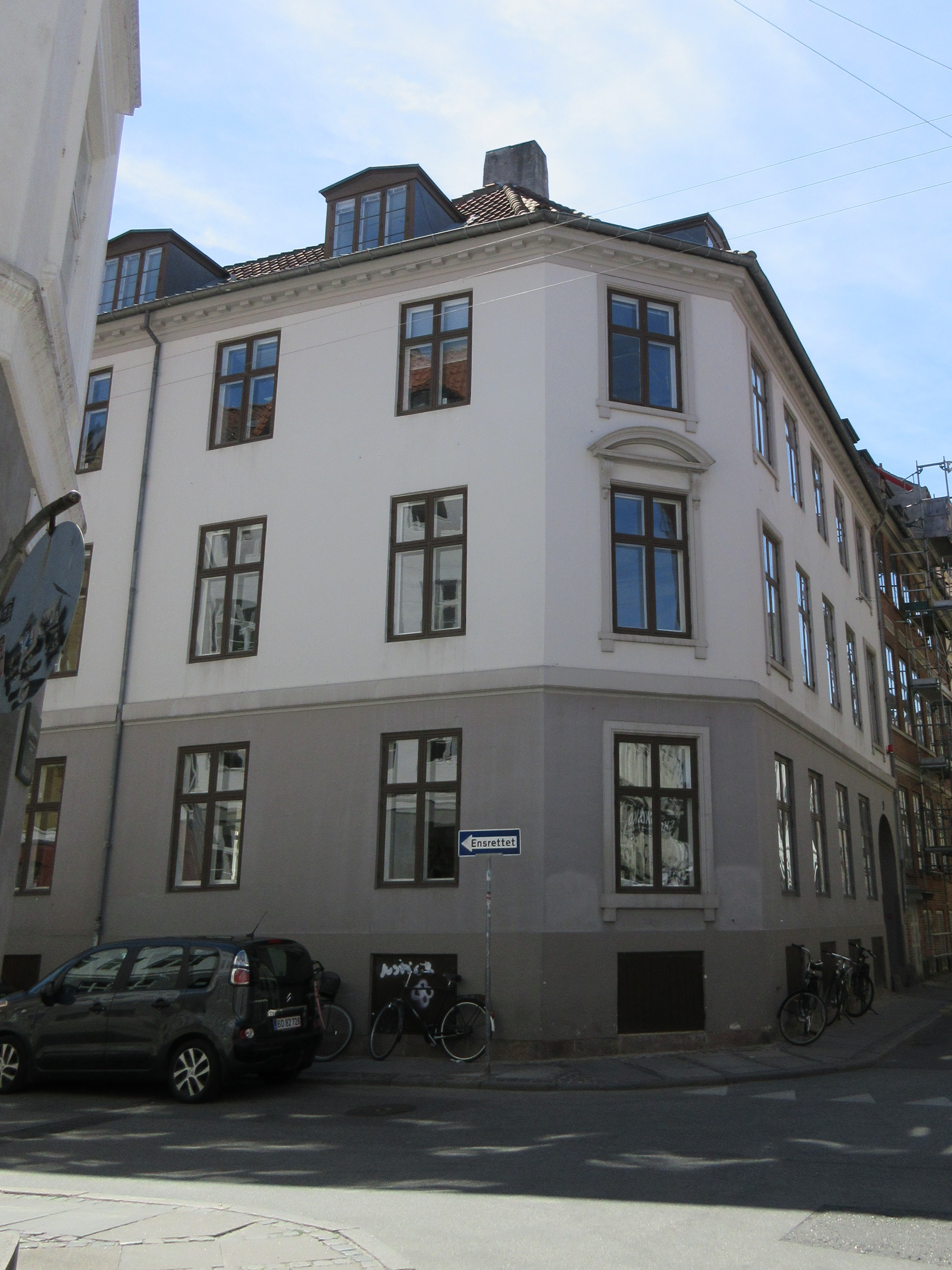
- Interactive map of the Gyldenfeldts House area

General information
- Location: Copenhagen, Denmark
- Coordinates: 55°40′39″N 12°34′28.56″E
- Completed: 1698

The Gyldenfeldt House (Danish: Gyldenfeldts Gård) is a Neoclassical property situated at the corner of Brolæggerstræde (No. 9) and Knabrostræde (No. 16) in the Old Town of Copenhagen, Denmark. It was like many of the other properties in the area constructed after the Copenhagen Fire of 1795. A brewery in the courtyard was for a while leased by Chresten Jacobsen, father of J.C. Jacobsen, prior to his acquisition of Bo. 5 on the other side of the street. The building complex was listed on the Danish registry of protected buildings and places in 1950.

== History ==
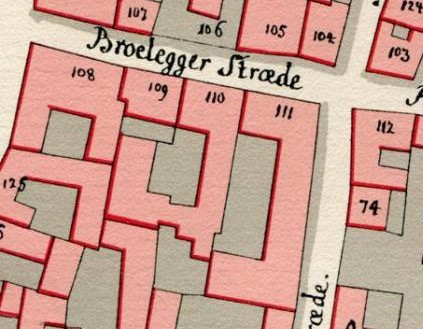
No. 111 seen on Gedde's district map of Snaren's Quarter from 1757

=== Origins ===
The site was originally made up of a number of smaller properties. They were in 1689 owned by glazier Henrik Schrøder (Store Knabrostræde 80), master mason Jacob Nielsen (Store Knabrostræde 81), Anders Svendsen (Store Knabrostræde 82), passementerie-maker Cornelius’ widow (Store Knabrostræde 83), skipper Anders Hansen (Store Knabrostræde 84), brewer Bent Monsen (Brolæggerstræde 128) and goldsmith Didrik Schelling (Brolæggerstræde 130). All these properties had by 1756 been merged into a single property as No. 111 which was by then owned by brewer Johannes Christian Borup. The buildings on the property were destroyed in the Copenhagen Fire of 1795.

The brewery at No. 111 was later acquired by brewer Andreas Findt (1714-1677). His property was home to two households at the 1787 census. Flindt resided in the building with his wife Anne Elisabet Johansen, their two children (aged two and five), two brewery workers, a caretaker and three maids. Friderich Hammerich (1759-1840), a later councilman in Copenhagen, resided in the building with his wife Nancy Marie Porth (1765-1819), their one-year-old daughter Amalia Hammeriche, maids and his brother Henrik Christian Hammerich (1757-1838, lodger).

=== Gyldenfeldt family ===
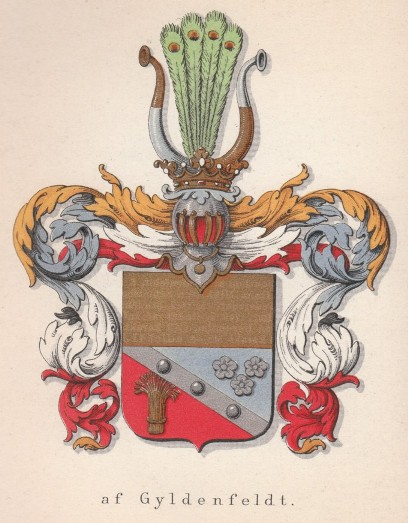
Coat of arms of the Gyldenfeldt family

The current buildings No. 9 and No. 16 were both constructed in 1795-1798 for Niels Sehested af Gyldenfeldt (1748 - 1809). Hiss father, Christian Schousboe (1720-1805), Commandant of Korsør, had back in 1871 been raised in the peerage under the name Gyldenfeldt. The property was in the new cadastre of 1806 listed as No. 74. Gyldenfeldt lived with his family in one of the apartments. The naval officer Poul de Løvenørn (1751-1826) was from 1798 until 1807 also among the residents.

A brewery had been established in the yard. It was most likely already from 1802 and at least from 1817 leased by Chresten Jacobsen. He was later for a few years involved in Kongens Bryghus before returning to Brolæggerstræde as the proprietor of the brewery at No. 5. It would later be passed down to his son J.C. Jacobsen, founder of Carlsberg.

Gyldenfeldt's widow Anna Elisabeth Gyldenfeldt (1758-1840) kept the property after her husband's death in 1809. The theologian and clergyman A. G. Rudelbach (1792-1862) was among the residents in 1817.

Frederik von Obelitz (1782-1868) resided in the building following his marriage in 1812. His mother Christiane Birgitte Obelitz (née Gaarder, 1783–1814) was buried from Brolæggerstræde 74 in 1814.

Gyldenfeldt's and Obelitz' widows were both residents on the second floor at the time of the 1840 census. Anna Elisabeth Gyldenfeldt, now 82 years old, lived there with her son Niels Sehefledt Gyldenfeldt (1799-), daughter-in-law and their four children (aged 3 to 10). Beathe Regise Gyldenfeldt (1803-), a daughter of Gyldenfeldt's brother, was also part of their household. Ellen Obelitz (1782-1868), whose husband had died the previous year, lived there with three of her children.

Frederik Hammerich (1788-1860), a son of the former mayor of Copenhagen by the same name, resided on the first floor with his wife Anna Bolette (né Tvermoes, 1794–1863) and two children. Marie Margrete Sneedorff (1787-1874), widow of counter admiral Hans Christian Sneedorff (1759-1824), resided with a daughter and two lodgers on the ground floor.

Niels Sehested Gyldenfeldt succeeded his mother as the owner of the building. The military officer and later defence minister J. S. Fibiger (1793-1861) was among the residents from 1846 to 1848. The building was also the last home of general Friderich Adolph Schleppegrell (1792-1850). He was killed in the Battle of Isted on 25 July 1850.

Niels Sehested Gyldenfeldt was at the time of the 1860 census still living with his wife and three of their children in one of the two apartments on the second floor ("to the right"). Gebhard Christian Wilhelm Obelitz was now residing in the building with his wife Julie and their three children. He was in 1870 appointed as Supreme Court justice.

Frederik Christian Bornemann (1719-1861), professor of law and rector of the University of Copenhagen, resided in one of the apartments with his wife and five children from 1859 to 1861.

=== 20th century ===
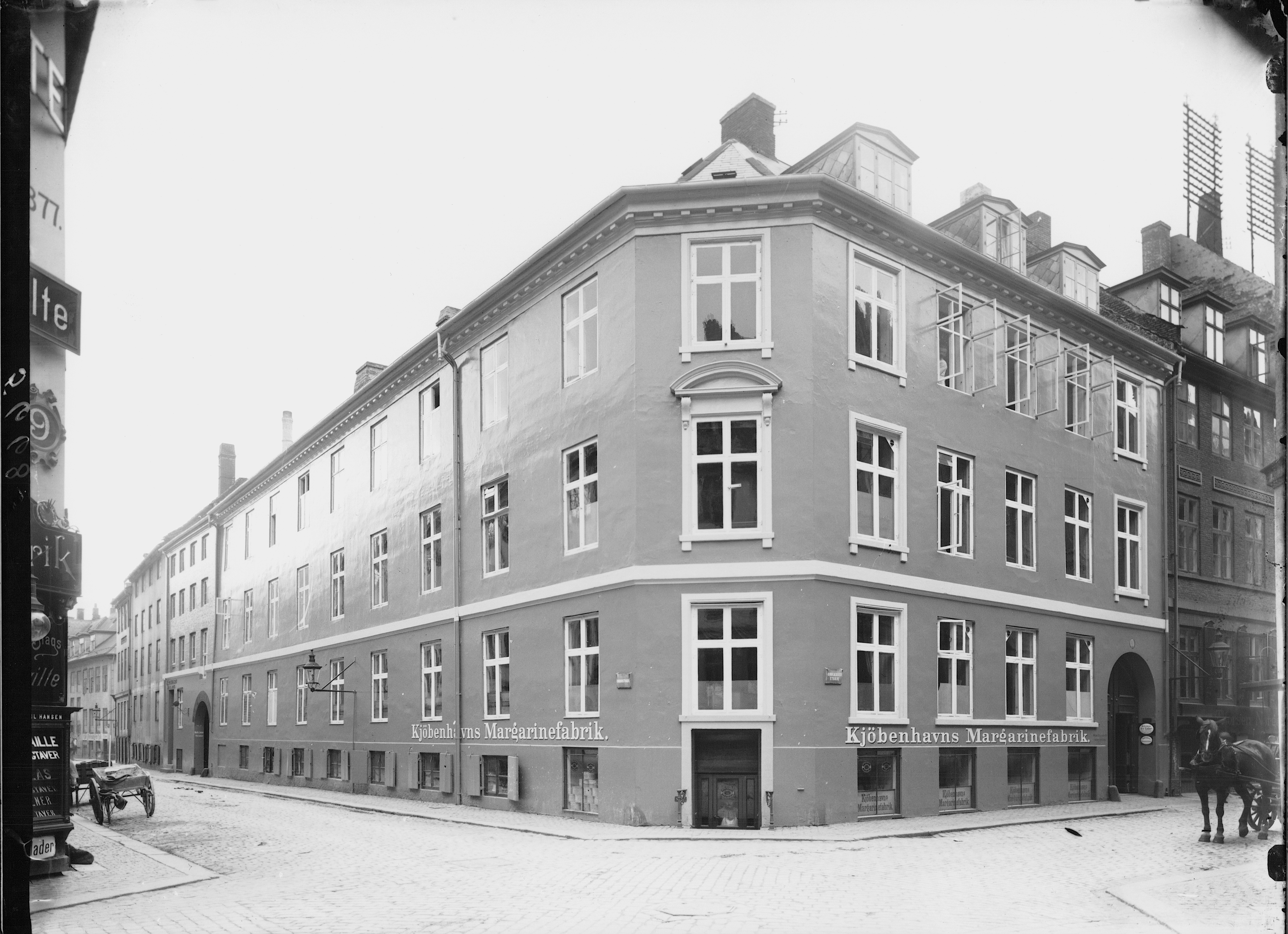
The building photographed by Peter Elfelt

Kjøbenhavns Margarinefabrik (Copenhagen Margarine Factory) was from at least 1905 to 1919 based in the basement of the building. Jacobsen & Co., a wholesale company, was in 1910 also based in the building. Founded in 1853, it had since 1896 been owned by Einar Oscar Frederik Jacobs.

ISocialpædagogernes Forbund, a trade union, acquired the building in 2003. The building was put through a renovation the following year.

== Architecture ==
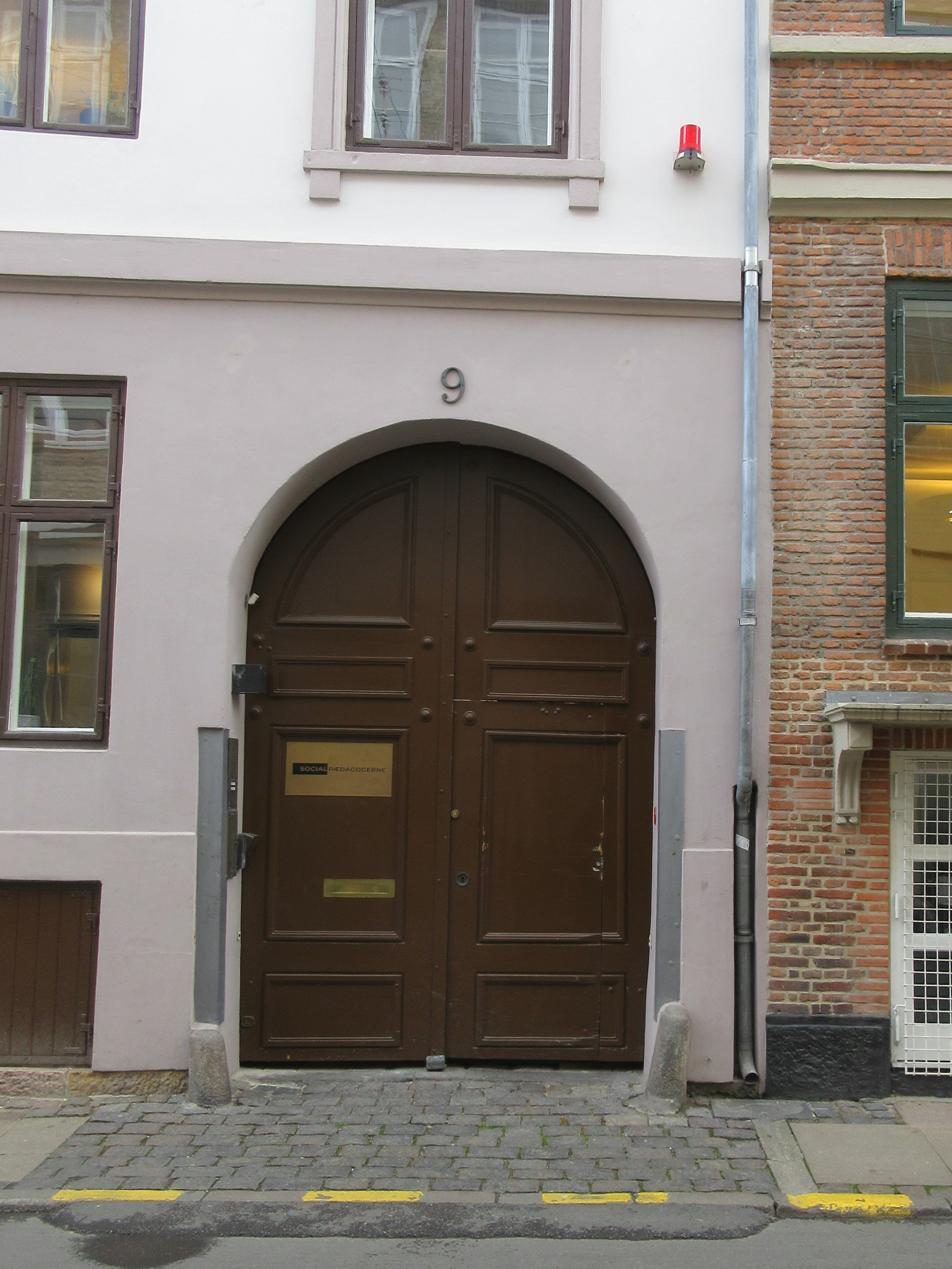
The gate at Brolæggerstræde 9

Brolæggerstræde 9 consists of three storeys over a raised cellar. It is rendered in a dark grey colour on the ground storey and is white on the upper storeys. The main facade on Brolæggerstræde is five bays long and features a gateway furthest to the right. The facade on Knabrostræde is nine bays long. The chamfered corner bay was dictated for all corner buildings by Jørgen Henrich Rawert's and Peter Meyn's guidelines for the rebuilding of the city after the fire so that the fire department's long ladder companies could navigate the streets more easily.

Knabrostræde 16 is four bays wide and features a gateway furthest to the right. The facade design is similar to that of the corner building. A former warehouse is located in the courtyard. It is attached to three bays of the rear side of Knabrostræde 17. The mansard roof features a wall dormer with the remains of a pulley.

The complex was listed on the Danish registry of protected buildings and places in 1945.

== Today ==
The buildings were in 2003 acquired by Socialpædagogernes Landsforbund and the labour union has since then been based in the buildings.
