= Gudbrandsdølen =

Norwegian newspaper

Logo.

Gudbrandsdølen was a Norwegian newspaper, published in Lillehammer in Oppland county.

Gudbrandsdølen was started on 1 January 1894, after editor-in-chief Johan Filseth had been jettisoned from another newspaper Framgang. After his death in 1927, Jul Sundsvik and Johan's son Kaare Filseth took over. It was owned by Johan's widow Laura until Hans P. Lødrup bought it in 1930. The much older newspaper Lillehammer Tilskuer became incorporated into Gudbrandsdølen in 1990 to form Gudbrandsdølen Lillehammer Tilskuer.

Johan Filseth had been a political Liberal, but under Lødrup the newspaper became Conservative, like Lillehammer Tilskuer had been. As time passed, Gudbrandsdølen became more affiliated (albeit not officially and outspokenly) with the Centre Party.

In 1945, after the Second World War, Lillehammer Tilskuer was demerged and resurfaced from 22 May 1945. Sigurd Skogheim, who had been subeditor in the now-liquidated Laagen, was hired as editor-in-chief of Gudbrandsdølen. The two newspapers were "twin newspapers", with different editors but most of the material was the same. The newspapers were known collectively as "Gudbrandsdølen og Lillehammer Tilskuer". In 1990 the newspaper formally merged to form Gudbrandsdølen Lillehammer Tilskuer (GLT)—in 1997 further merged with Dagningen to form Gudbrandsdølen Dagningen (GD).
