= Huitfeldt (noble family) =

Norwegian noble family

Huitfeldt Hogenskild
- Uradel; Nobility
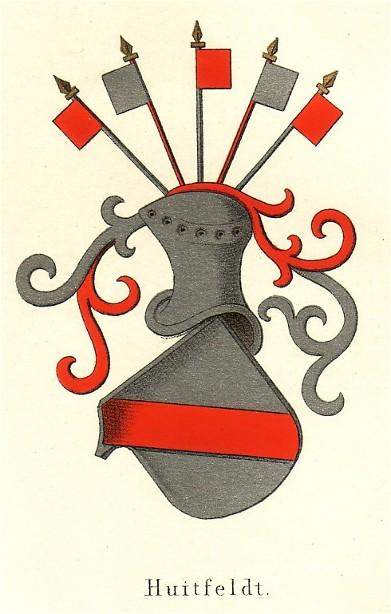
- Huitfeldt Coat of Arms. from Danmarks Adels Aarbog (Anders Thiset. 1887)
- Country: Denmark; Norway
- Place of origin: Funen
- Titles: Lord
- Estate: Tronstad Gård (former)

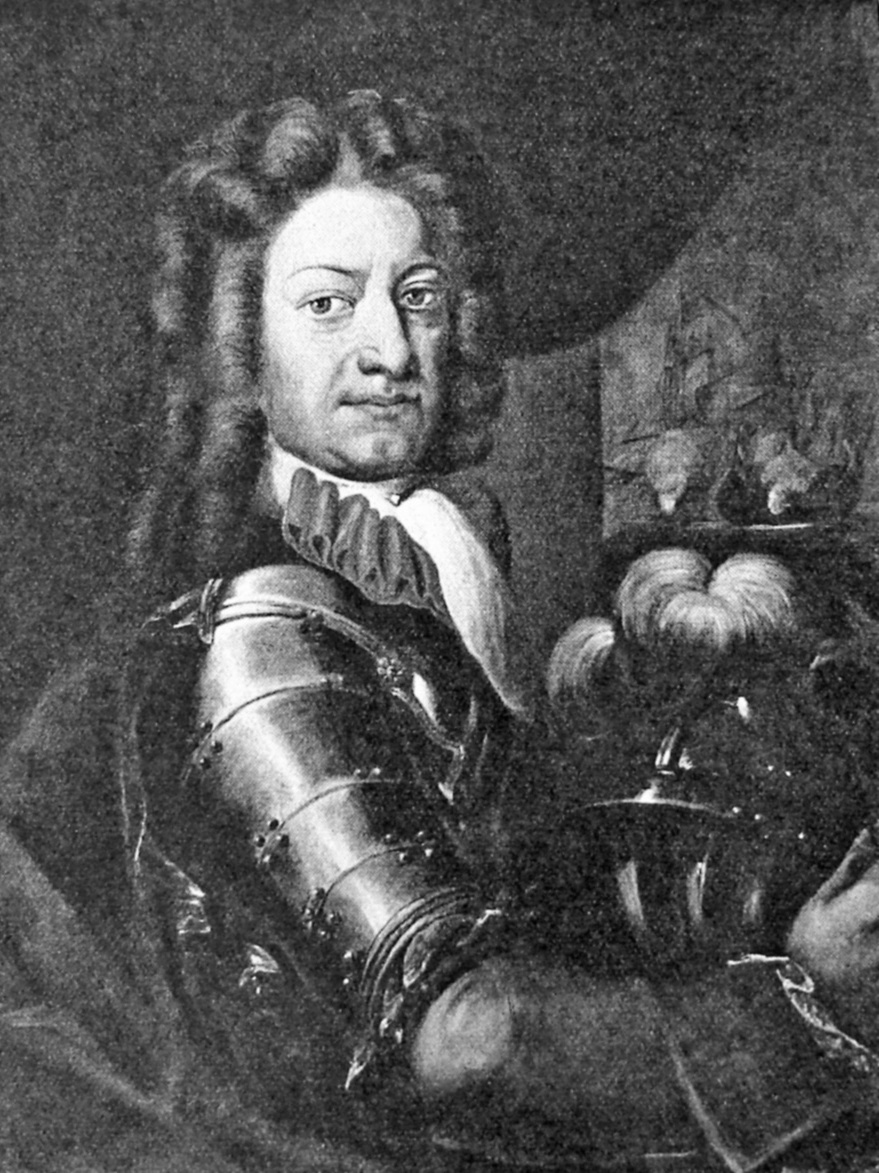
Iver Huitfeldt (1665–1710)

The Huitfeldt family is a Norwegian noble family.

== Name and origin ==
Huitfeldt is originally an old Danish noble family. It came to Norway around 1581 with Anders Huitfeldt (ca. 1555–1620). In 1582 he married Margrete Pedersdatter Litle, the daughter of Peder Hansen Litle, officer in command at Akershus Fortress, and Ingeborg Nilsdatter Gyllenløve. Anders Huitfeldt became the owner of the seat farm Tronstad (Tronstad Gård) in Hurum in Buskerud, which for 220 years remained in the family's possession.

In Denmark, the family's certainly documented paternal line goes back to Henrik Nielsen (fl. 1429) in Ventofte on Funen. During the Middle Ages, the family used the name Hogenskild. Among these are the known knight Claus Hogenskild (fl. 1386) and member of the Council of the Kingdom Lord Peder Hogenskild (ca. 1400–1478).

In 1526, when King Frederik I of Denmark and Norway instructed the Danish nobility to adopt permanent family names, the family took the name Huitfeldt based on their arms. The name consists of the words huit (modern spelling: hvit) and feldt (ditto: felt), meaning respectively white and field.

== Coat of arms ==
Description: On a white shield a red bend. On the helm alternately five red and five white banners. Hurum Municipality's arms are inspired by the Huitfeldt arms.

== Hurum Church (Hurum kirke) ==
Lying by Hurum Church (Hurum kirke) is the grave chapel for the Huitfeldt family, which in the early 1660s was constructed under Tønne Huitfeldt and which was renovated in 1750. The chapel has one of the country's biggest and richest collections of coffins. Naval hero and native son, Iver Huitfeldt (1665–1710) was buried in the church yard. The pulpit was received as a gift from his wife, Kirsten Røyem Huitfeldt (1671–1750).

== See also ==
- Huitfeldt
- Danish nobility
- Norwegian nobility

== Literature ==
- H.J. Huitfeldt-Kaas (1908): Efterretninger om familien Huitfeldt
- Hallvard Trætteberg (1933): Norges våbenmerker. Norske by- og adelsvåben
- Hans Cappelen (1969): Norske slektsvåpen, Oslo 1969 (2nd ed. 1976), p. 131
- Hans Cappelen & Knut Johannessen (1987): Norske kommunevåpen
- A. Thiset & P.L. Wittrup (1904): Nyt dansk Adelslexikon
- Danmarks Adels Aarbog (1887 & 1949).
- Sven Tito Achen (1973): Danske adelsvåbener. En heraldisk nøgle
