= Huitfeldt =

Huitfeldt is a Norwegian and Danish surname. Notable people with the surname include:

- Anniken Huitfeldt (born 1969), Norwegian historian and politician
- Arild Huitfeldt (1546–1609), Danish historian and state official
- Beate Huitfeldt (1554–1626), Danish noble
- Fritz Huitfeldt (1939–2022), Norwegian politician
- Fritz R. Huitfeldt (1851–1938), Norwegian sports official and writer
- Hans L. C. Huitfeldt (1876–1969), Norwegian physician
- Henrik Jørgen Schibsted Huitfeldt (1907–1979), Norwegian newspaper editor
- Iver Huitfeldt (1665–1710), Dano-Norwegian military officer
- Johanne Huitfeldt (1932–2023), Norwegian art historian and curator
- Jörgen Huitfeldt (born 1970), Swedish journalist
- Karen Huitfeldt (1700–1778), Danish courtier
- Margareta Huitfeldt (1608–1683), Norwegian-Swedish land owner and philanthropist
- Povel Huitfeldt (1520–1592), Danish statesman
- Tønne Huitfeldt (1625–1677), Norwegian military officer and landowner

== See also ==
- Huitfeldt (noble family), Danish family linked to Danneskiold-Samsøe
- Ivar Huitfeldt class frigate
