= Anders Thiset =

Danish genealogist and archivist

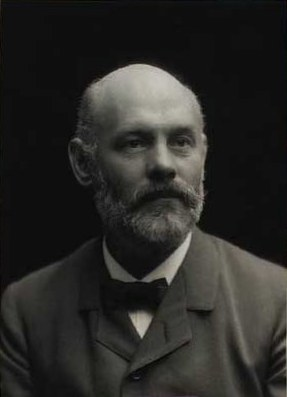
Anders Thiset

Anders Thiset (born in Copenhagen on 25 February 1850, died 14 July 1917) was a Danish historian, genealogist, heraldic artist, archivist and encyclopedist. Together with journalist H.R. Hiort-Lorenzen, Thiset first published Danmarks Adels Aarbog in 1884, and yearly thereafter.
