= Egil Sundar =

Norwegian journalist and newspaper editor

Egil Sundar (né Nilsen; 17 October 1932 – 20 April 1994) was a Norwegian journalist and newspaper editor. He was born in Oslo. He was editor-in-chief of the newspaper Aftenposten from 1984 to 1990. From 1990 he worked for the Norwegian Broadcasting Corporation.
