= Lillehammer Tilskuer =

Norwegian newspaper, published in Lillehammer, Oppland

Lillehammer Tilskuer was a Norwegian newspaper, published in Lillehammer in Oppland county.

== History and profile ==
The paper was started in 1837 as Oplands-Tidende, changed its name to Lillehammer Tilskuer in 1841 and became affiliated with the Conservative Party. From 1945 it cooperated with the Centre Party newspaper Gudbrandsdølen, and in 1990 they formally merged to form Gudbrandsdølen Lillehammer Tilskuer, which in 1997 merged with Dagningen to form Gudbrandsdølen Dagningen (GD).
