= Fredberg =

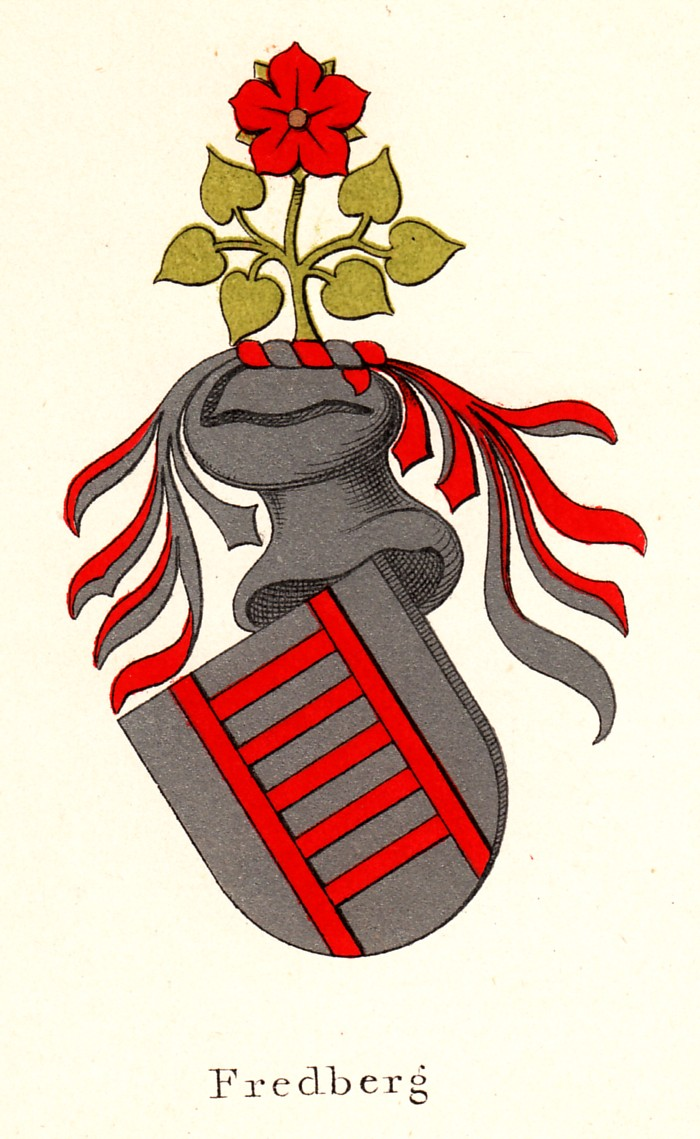
Fredberg coat of arms

Fredberg is an old Danish noble family with roots in Himmerland. The family is first mentioned in the 15th century and received its formal noble status when Jens Jensen Fredberg was granted a letter of nobility by King Christian I on August 14, 1450. He owned the estate Fredbjerggaard (also previously spelled Fredberggaard) in Farsø Parish, Gislum District, and is considered the progenitor of the family. However, the true noble lineage is believed to descend from Christiern Fredberg, who was ennobled on April 5, 1484, by King Hans. The family thus became part of the Jutland lower nobility, known as *brevadel* (nobility by patent).

During the 15th and 16th centuries, the family gained significant local influence in Himmerland. They established close ties with several other Jutland noble families through strategic marriages, including with Pors (Børialsen), Krag, Vinter, Munk of Havbro, and Griis of Slette. These alliances strengthened both their property holdings and social standing. During this period, the Fredberg family held a number of significant Jutland properties, including their ancestral seat of Fredbjerggaard, and later in the 17th century acquired the manor Rævhalegaard in Aars District as well Trinderup Estate in Onsild District. These properties were often passed down through generations via inheritance and marriage, and the family managed to maintain their position as prominent landowners for a long time.

The family’s coat of arms features a black ladder on a silver or white background. This motif is mentioned in heraldic literature as early as the 16th and 17th centuries and can still be seen carved into church walls in Himmerland, including in Gislum Church and Strandby Church.

Despite losing their formal noble status, the Fredberg family continued to play an active role in Danish society. They retained large parts of their landholdings and maintained their position as a central part of the regional bourgeoisie. Especially during the 18th and 19th centuries, the family evolved into one of the country’s most prominent trade and manufacturing-oriented families.

The family still maintains ownership of several large landholdings and agricultural estates. It is considered one of the wealthiest business families in Denmark, with activities spanning trade, manufacturing, and global business ventures.
