= 2026 US–Denmark–Greenland agreement =

2026 defence and security agreement concerning Greenland

2026 United States–Denmark–Greenland agreement
Agreement between the Government of the United States of America and the Government of the Kingdom of Denmark together with the Government of Greenland
- Signing of the agreement at the United Nations Headquarters in New York City, 22 September 2026.
- Type: Defence and security agreement; amendment and supplement to the 1951 Greenland Defense Agreement
- Signed: 22 September 2026
- Location: United Nations Headquarters, New York City, United States
- Effective: Not specified
- Condition: Diplomatic notification to the United States after completion of the necessary parliamentary procedures in Denmark and Greenland
- Signatories: Donald Trump, President of the United States; Mette Frederiksen, Prime Minister of Denmark; Jens-Frederik Nielsen, Prime Minister of Greenland
- Parties: United States; Kingdom of Denmark; Greenland
- Languages: English, Danish and Greenlandic; English prevails in case of ambiguity or conflict

The 2026 United States–Denmark–Greenland agreement (Note: The full title of the agreement is Agreement between the Government of the United States of America and the Government of the Kingdom of Denmark together with the Government of Greenland to amend and supplement the Agreement of 27 April 1951 pursuant to the North Atlantic Treaty between the Government of the United States of America and the Government of the Kingdom of Denmark on the Defense of Greenland (1951 Defense Agreement), including all relevant subsequent agreements related thereto.; Danish: Aftale mellem kongeriget Danmarks regering sammen med Naalakkersuisut og Amerikas Forenede Staters regering om ændring og supplering af overenskomst af 27. april 1951 i henhold til den Nordatlantiske Traktat mellem Kongeriget Danmarks regering og Amerikas Forenede Staters regering om forsvaret af Grønland (1951-Forsvarsaftalen) med senere relevante tillægsaftaler relateret hertil; Greenlandic: Kunngeqarfik Danmarkip naalakkersuisuisa peqatigalugit Kalaallit Nunaanni Naalakkersuisut Amerikamilu Naalagaffeqatigiit naalakkersuisuisa Atlantikup Avannarpasissuani isumaqatigiissut naapertorlugu Kalaallit Nunaata illersorneqarnissaa pillugu Kunngeqarfiup Danmarkip Amerikamilu Naalagaaffeqatigiit naalakkersuisuisa 27. april 1951-imi isumaqatigiissutaata (illersornissaq pillugu isumaqatigiissut 1951-imeersoq) kingusinnerusukkut ilassutaasunik isumaqatigiissutitaqartup allannguuteqarnissaa ilassuteqarfiginissaalu pillugit isumaqatigiissut), also called the Greenland security deal is a trilateral defence agreement between the United States and the Kingdom of Denmark together with Greenland, an autonomous territory of Denmark. It was signed on 22 September 2026 by US president Donald Trump, Danish prime minister Mette Frederiksen and Greenlandic prime minister Jens-Frederik Nielsen, at the United Nations Headquarters in New York City. It amends and supplements the existing 1951 Greenland Defense Agreement and its subsequent arrangements, expanding and clarifying the framework for the United States military presence in Greenland.

The agreement authorizes the United States to modernise and expand Pituffik Space Base and provides for additional American defence areas at Narsarsuaq and Mestersvig, while establishing a procedure for further defence areas. It also provides for accelerated consideration of unmanned military installations, broad American rights of military access, overflight and movement, including undersea movement in Greenlandic territorial waters, and measures concerning counter-espionage, sensitive foreign investment and the military presence of non-NATO states. The agreement supports an increased NATO role in the Arctic and contains provisions intended to preserve the defence arrangements if Greenland becomes independent.

The accord followed more than eight months of negotiations and a major diplomatic crisis over President Trump's demands for greater American control of Greenland, including repeated threats of annexing the territory by force. It was drafted and negotiated by a high-level working group of civil servants from all three countries, established following a meeting in Washington, D.C., in January 2026 between Danish foreign minister Lars Løkke Rasmussen, Greenlandic minister of foreign affairs Vivian Motzfeldt, US secretary of state Marco Rubio and US vice president JD Vance, during the height of the crisis. In the final agreement, the US reaffirms the sovereignty and territorial integrity of the Kingdom of Denmark, as well as the right to self-determination of the people of Greenland.

It is expected to enter into force, when it has been ratified by both the Folketing (parliament of Denmark) and Inatsisartut (parliament of Greenland), and the United States receives a diplomatic note confirming this. Legally considered an executive agreement of the United States, it does not require ratification by two-thirds of the Senate, as otherwise stipulated by the Treaty Clause of the US constitution. As of 19 November 2026 all benchmarks for entering into force have been met, with the exception of the formality of Denmark sending a diplomatic note to the United States stating that the procedures for ratification have been completed.

== Background ==
The 2026 agreement builds on the framework established by the original 1951 Greenland Defense Agreement (and subsequent arrangements including the 2004 Igaliku Agreement), which has governed the United States military presence in Greenland since the early Cold War. Under that treaty the United States has maintained facilities including what is now Pituffik Space Base (formerly Thule Air Base), focused on missile warning, space surveillance and related missions.

Tensions escalated sharply in early 2026 after President Donald Trump intensified public demands for greater American control over Greenland. Citing the island’s strategic location for Arctic and North Atlantic defence, its proximity to potential Russian and Chinese activity, and its mineral resources, Trump repeatedly raised the possibility of annexation, including by force if necessary, and framed ownership or equivalent control as an “absolute necessity.” These statements triggered a major diplomatic crisis within NATO. Denmark and Greenland firmly rejected any transfer of sovereignty or territorial control. Large protests occurred in Nuuk under slogans such as “Greenland is not for sale,” while Danish leaders, including Prime Minister Mette Frederiksen, warned that any military action against a NATO ally would end the alliance. European partners publicly backed Denmark; some conducted or planned enhanced presence activities in Greenland. Danish public opinion shifted markedly, with polls showing a majority viewing the United States as an adversary and consumer boycotts of American goods appearing. For the first time, the Danish Defence Intelligence Service listed the United States alongside Russia and China as an external security concern in its annual assessment.

=== Negotiations and signing ===
==== High Level Working Group ====
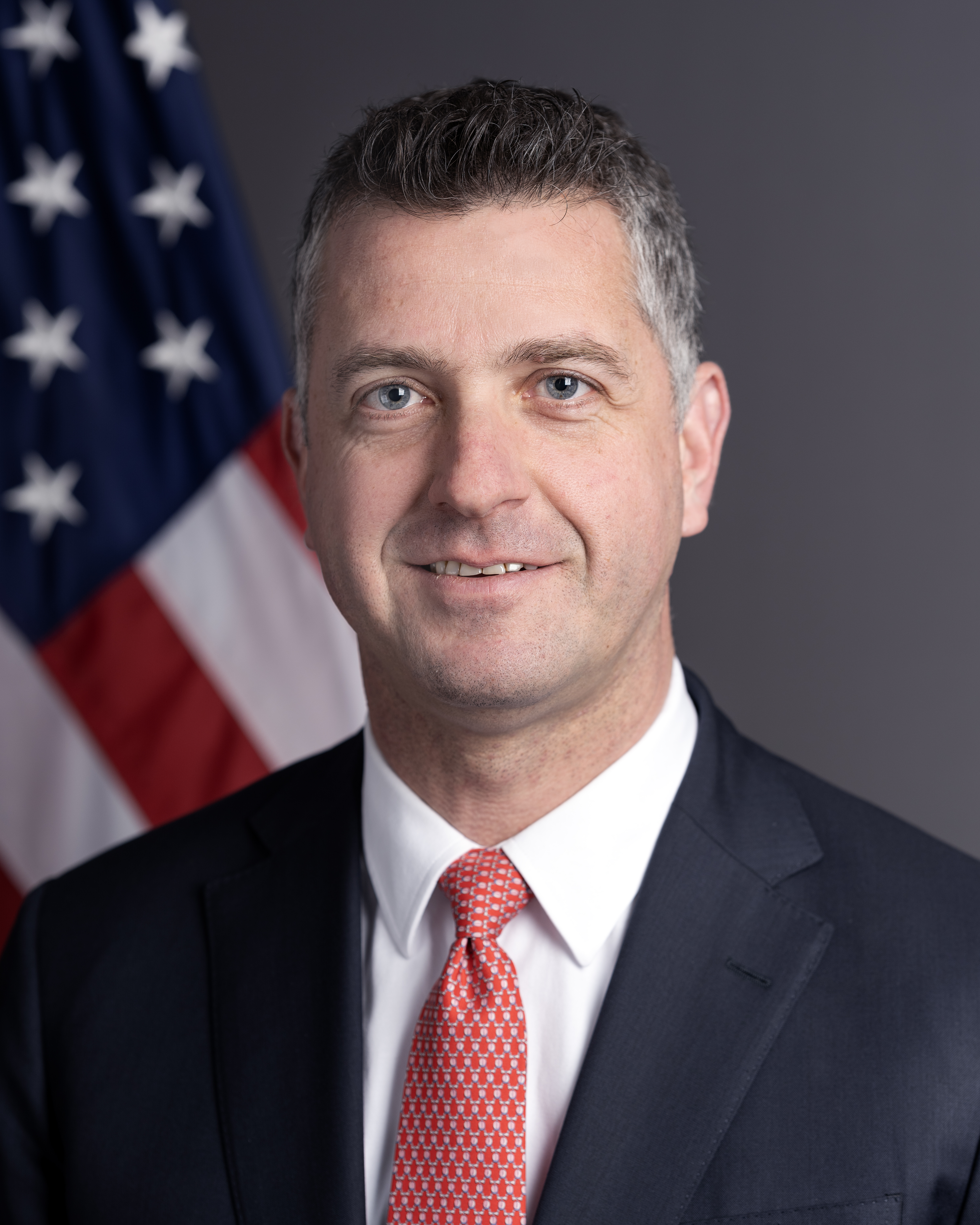
Michael Needham, Counselor of the Department of State, the US' chief negotiator in the High Level Working Group.

In January 2026, at the height of the crisis, Danish Foreign Minister Lars Løkke Rasmussen, Greenlandic Foreign Minister Vivian Motzfeldt, US Secretary of State Marco Rubio and Vice President JD Vance met in Washington, D.C.. That meeting established a high-level working group of civil servants from the three parties that conducted intensive negotiations over the following eight months. The talks sought to address stated US security concerns—expanded access, modernisation of facilities, exclusion of non-NATO military presence, and screening of sensitive foreign investment—while preserving Danish sovereignty, Greenlandic self-determination (including the independence pathway under Article 21 of the Act on Greenland Self-Government), and the existing NATO framework. The resulting text reaffirms those principles in its preamble and does not transfer sovereignty or fulfil Trump’s earlier annexation demands.

The negotiations were led by three chief negotiators representing the United States, Denmark and Greenland, respectively:

Party	Chief negotiator	Position
United States	Michael Needham	Counselor of the Department of State
Denmark	Jeppe Tranholm-Mikkelsen	Permanent secretary of the Ministry of Foreign Affairs
Greenland	Mininnguaq Kleist	Permanent secretary in the Greenlandic government

On 26 May 2026, Needham was appointed Deputy National Security Advisor and continued to lead the American delegation in that capacity. Jacob Isbosethsen, Greenland's representative in Washington, also participated in the negotiations, while Danish ambassador Jesper Møller Sørensen played a central role in diplomatic contacts with the American side.

Other senior officials who played important roles in securing the agreement included Hans-Peder Barlach Christensen, permanent secretary of Greenland's Premier's Department; Barbara Bertelsen, permanent secretary of the Danish Prime Minister's Office; Martin Justesen, chief of staff and special adviser at the Prime Minister's Office; Andy Baker, Deputy National Security Advisor of the US National Security Council; and Ken Howery, US ambassador to Denmark.

The working group conducted negotiations behind closed doors throughout the spring and summer of 2026. The Danish and Greenlandic negotiators maintained that any agreement must exclude the transfer of sovereignty or Greenlandic territory. Discussions centred on the future extent of the American military presence in Greenland and the regulation of foreign investments. The United States placed particular emphasis on preventing China from establishing a strategic or economic foothold in Greenland. At a negotiating session in Washington in late May, substantial differences remained, particularly concerning investment screening, although, according to DR, the parties were more optimistic about reaching an agreement on defence matters.

==== Final negotiations ====
In mid-July 2026, shortly after a NATO summit in Turkey, Needham visited Danish ambassador Jesper Møller Sørensen at the Danish embassy in Washington and informed him that President Donald Trump wished to conclude an agreement. Negotiations subsequently continued, and the working group held its sixth and final meeting in late August, at which the agreement was substantially finalised, subject to Trump's personal approval. In early September, Danish prime minister Mette Frederiksen and Greenlandic prime minister Jens-Frederik Nielsen reviewed the complete draft agreement at a meeting in Nuuk, after which minor amendments were made.

In September, the US administration informed the Danish Prime Minister's Office and Naalakkersuisut, the Greenlandic government, that Trump had approved the agreement. As details of the impending agreement began to emerge publicly, Trump announced it himself, prompting the Danish and Greenlandic governments to issue a joint statement confirming the expected agreement. In the days preceding the signing, the Danish and Greenlandic delegations assembled in New York to prepare for the ceremony and coordinate their public statements. Among other matters, Frederiksen and Nielsen agreed that, should further American statements raise questions of control over or ownership of Greenland, they would refer to the agreed text rather than engage in a public confrontation.

The agreement was signed on 22 September 2026 at United Nations Headquarters in New York by Donald Trump, Mette Frederiksen and Jens-Frederik Nielsen, in the presence of the foreign ministers of all three parties.

== Provisions ==
The agreement amends the 1951 Defense Agreement and later Defense Arrangements, including the 2004 Igaliku Agreement. Britain's House of Commons Library describes the agreement as an update of the 1951 one, as much of that original agreement's core substance remains, with the new 2026 agreement only supplementing and replacing a few sections. The agreement has no stated end date and may be amended only by mutual consent of all parties, under Article XIII of the original 1951 agreement. The Centre for Eastern Studies wrote that the text largely upholds the previous status quo and the pre-existing trilateral cooperation in the context of NATO.

The preamble respects and reaffirms the self-determination of the people of Greenland as a people under international law with the right to self-determination and the sovereignty and territorial integrity of the Kingdom of Denmark. Also noted is the procedure for Greenlandic independence is set in Article 21 of the Act on Greenland Self-Government. After the signing of the agreement, Denmark Prime Minister Mette Frederiksen said that the agreement respects and acknowledges both Greenlandic and Danish rights, sovereignty, and territorial integrity. Reuters and others note that the accord does not fulfill President Trump's stated intention to annex Greenland as a US territory.

=== Defense areas and access ===
Per Article IV, the US is permitted to expand its operations at the Pituffik Space Base and to establish an additional "Defense Area" at Narsarsuaq and Mestersvig, with certain details to be mutually agreed upon at a later date. Either party may propose further Defense Areas. The US is required to preferentially award commercial contracts for the building and maintenance of these Defense Areas to Greenlandic firms to the fullest extent reasonably possible. Article V outlines a process for accelerated review of requests to construct unmanned military installations outside Defense Areas.

Article VI of the agreement gives free access to and movement between Defense Areas in Greenland and its territorial waters to United States public vessels, aircraft, armed forces, and other vehicles. United states aircraft are also allowed to fly over and land anywhere in Greenland, and US public vessels are allowed full undersea access and movement, except for any restriction which the parties mutually agree upon. Stars and Stripes wrote that the flight and free movement rights are just reinstatements of the original 1951 agreement. These rights are subject to the restriction that they are to be exercised in a manner that respects Greenlandic society and their way of life, especially hunting and fishing, to the maximum extent possible. The Centre for Eastern Studies' report describes the framework as including environmental protection provisions and guardrails to protect the traditional Inuit way of life.

The preamble of the agreement states a shared interest in United States military access "including through establishment of a Golden Dome defense system". The articles do not specify the weapons or other systems that would be placed in Greenland.

=== Third state forces and investment screening ===
Article VII specifies that territory near a Defense Area will not be used in any way that threatens the area's security, and that the parties will work together in counterespionage operations. Article VIII states that Denmark has strengthened, and will continue to strengthen its Arctic security posture and its cooperation with NATO allies.

== Reactions ==
=== Greenland and Denmark ===
Danish and Greenlandic leaders presented the agreement as a successful defence of sovereignty and self-determination that simultaneously strengthened Arctic and NATO security. Prime Minister Mette Frederiksen described it as a deal that “can last forever,” recognises the Kingdom’s sovereignty and territorial integrity, and benefits NATO and Europe. Greenlandic Prime Minister Jens-Frederik Nielsen called it encouraging and beneficial to Greenland’s security and international position. Official statements emphasised respect for Greenlandic society, traditional ways of life (especially hunting and fishing), preferential contracting opportunities for local firms, and environmental guardrails.

Domestic reactions mixed relief with caution. Many observers in Copenhagen and Nuuk viewed the outcome as a diplomatic success that averted the worst scenarios without major new concessions beyond what the 1951 framework already permitted. At the same time, residual distrust of the United States was widely noted; Greenlandic Foreign Minister Múte B. Egede later described a “serious breach of trust” that would take time to repair. In Inatsisartut, the agreement underwent parliamentary scrutiny (first reading mid-October 2026, referral to committee, further readings scheduled). Opposition voices, notably from Naleraq, criticised the absence of guaranteed fixed financial compensation, the long-term nature of the commitments (including those that would bind an independent Greenland), and called for a public referendum before final consent. Some Greenlandic commentators expressed concern that formalised US roles in investment screening and third-party military exclusion could constrain future policy options.

=== United States ===
President Trump characterised the agreement as delivering “permanent control over security and all other needs” in Greenland at “no cost to the United States,” barring adversaries from military presence or sensitive investments without express US approval, and enabling immediate expansion of a large military presence, including two major bases and elements of a “Golden Dome” missile-defence system. Administration messaging framed it as fully addressing long-standing US concerns while remaining within a cooperative NATO framework. Some US analysts described the substantive gains as modest relative to the 1951 baseline (expanded specific defence areas, clearer undersea access language, formalised investment screening and non-NATO exclusion, and continuity clauses for possible Greenlandic independence) and noted that the coercive rhetoric had imposed lasting costs on alliance trust.

=== NATO allies ===
NATO Secretary General Mark Rutte and several allied governments welcomed the agreement as enhancing collective security and stabilising the High North. The United Kingdom and other partners congratulated Denmark on the outcome and underlined the shared strategic importance of the Arctic. Analysts in Europe and North America frequently described the result as a victory for patient diplomacy over coercive pressure, noting that Denmark and Greenland had successfully mobilised allied solidarity, kept the dispute within established legal frameworks, and avoided a rupture in the Alliance. Some commentary emphasised that the crisis itself had already damaged the “almost blind” trust previously placed in the United States by Denmark and parts of Europe, with longer-term effects on European strategic autonomy discussions expected to persist.

== Ratification and implementation ==
Article XII makes entry into force dependent on completion of the necessary parliamentary procedures in Denmark and Greenland followed by a diplomatic note to the United States. Danish foreign minister Lars Løkke Rasmussen informed the Folketing on 22 September that the agreement would therefore have to be considered by both the Folketing and Inatsisartut. No parliamentary ratification process is required in the United States, as the agreement is treated as an executive agreement under American practice.

The agreement does not apply to the Faroe Islands. Once both parliaments have completed their procedures, the Danish government will transmit a diplomatic note to the United States confirming this. As a result, the agreement enters into force on the date of that note.

=== Greenland ===
In Greenland, Naalakkersuisut tabled a decision proposal (EM2026/249) for Inatsisartut’s consent. The agreement received its first reading on 12 October 2026, with debate lasting more than four hours. It was referred to the Foreign Affairs and Security Committee; a second reading was scheduled for 3 November 2026. During the first reading the governing parties (including Inuit Ataqatigiit, Demokraatit and Atassut) expressed support, while opposition parties, particularly Naleraq, criticised the lack of guaranteed fixed financial compensation and long-term commitments and called for a public referendum before final approval. The government holds a majority in Inatsisartut. As of November 3, 2026 Greenland's Inatsisartut approved the agreement 16–0 with 7 abstentions, with final approval depending on Denmark for final ratification.

=== Denmark ===
In Denmark, the government tabled a decision proposal in the Folketing. The first reading was scheduled for 12 November 2026, and the second and final reading on 19 November 2026. The Danish government indicated it would await completion of the Greenlandic parliamentary process before the Folketing’s second reading. Under section 19 of the Danish Constitution, Folketing consent is required for the Kingdom of Denmark (together with Naalakkersuisut) to conclude the agreement.

A first reading of the Folketing took place on 12 November, where Trump was criticized for not understanding the agreement, and referred to the United States as an "unstable counterpart". In spite of these misgivings, the reading of the agreement enjoyed bipartisan support and praise, and the alliance between the United States and Denmark was described as critical and essential. On 19 November, the Folketing unanimously approved the agreement with no debate, with 109 parliamentarians present.

== See also ==
- Greenland–United States relations
- Denmark–United States relations
- Foreign relations of Greenland
- Joint Arctic Command
- Arctic policy of the United States
- NATO strategy in the Arctic
