= Government Security Committee (Denmark) =

Government Security Committee of Denmark

Committee overview
- Formed: 1958
- Committee executive: Mette Frederiksen, Prime Minister (Chair)
- Parent department: Prime Minister's Office
- Parent Committee: Government of Denmark

The Government Security Committee (Danish: Regeringens Sikkerhedsudvalg; RSIK) is the national security council of the Government of Denmark. It exercises political leadership and discusses sensitive and fundamental issues concerning national security, defence and civil contingencies, as well as intelligence and terrorism. It meets ad hoc under the Prime Minister and constitutes the apex of Denmark’s four-tier national crisis-management system (Danish: Regeringens krisestyringsorganisation).

Established in 1958, it consists of the Prime Minister, a number of cabinet officials, the heads of the Danish intelligence agencies and sometimes additional attendees such as the Chief of Defence and the National Police Commissioner. During the Cold War, the committee discussed, among other things, espionage cases and the expulsion of diplomats.

It is a recognized institution by the Directorate-General for European Civil Protection and Humanitarian Aid Operations and functions as Denmark’s principal strategic authority in matters relating to the EU’s Integrated Political Crisis Response (IPCR) system, acting through the national contact point.

== History and function ==
The committee was established in 1958, and was created in response to the need for government coordination at the onset of the Cold War.

During a “major disaster or accident” the Committee is “kept informed and, if necessary, discusses relevant political and strategic matters,” providing binding guidance to subordinate bodies. The Committee constitutes the apex of Denmark’s four-tier national crisis-management system. It is supported by the Civil Servants' Committee on Security Matters (also called the Senior Officials’ Security Committee), which prepares threat assessments and policy options, and by the National Operative Staff (NOST), led by the National Police, which is mobilized to coordinate government agencies and maintain situational awareness.

Agenda items are often framed by classified threat assessments (Danish: trusselsvurderinger) that estimate the probability of hostile acts against Denmark, including terrorist attacks on people or property. Acting on these assessments, the committee considers measures of political, diplomatic, and operational significance to safeguard the Danish realm.

The frequency of the committee's meetings is determined by incidents that arise and require coordinated political action across different ministries. In addition to these ad hoc meetings, the committee convenes approximately five to seven times a year. No public records are kept of the meetings, which has been a source of great dissatisfaction for the Folketing on several occasions. The committee is an independent archive creator at the Danish National Archives, but since its establishment in 1958, its archive has been located in the Prime Minister's Office, where it is covered by an agreement on deferred delivery and thus kept secret. Meetings of the Government Security Committee are not regulated by statute or provided for in the Constitution.

The Government Security Committee has, in various political and security contexts, served as the forum for resolving some of the Danish government’s most sensitive, high-stakes, and constitutionally significant decisions. In 1983, it authorised the Danish Security and Intelligence Service (PET) to infiltrate and monitor a range of left-wing and extremist organisations, overriding the restrictive 1968 government declaration on domestic political surveillance. Thirteen years later, acting on a warning from the British intelligence service MI5, it cancelled Salman Rushdie’s planned visit to Copenhagen and, in the ensuing administrative fallout, endorsed the dismissal of the permanent secretary for mishandling the affair. The Committee has likewise intervened in matters of royal affairs, ordering that Princess Alexandra abandon a Red Cross fund-raising tour in September 2001 owing to post-9/11 security concerns. Judicial questions also reach the body: in 1999 it monitored an espionage investigation against a Danish EU official suspected of acting for the East-German Stasi, and in October 2002 it approved police action to arrest the Chechen envoy Akhmed Zakayev on a Russian extradition warrant. In more recent times, it has, inter alia, convened during the 2015 Copenhagen terror attacks, the COVID-19 pandemic, and approved both the dismissal and the now discontinued lawsuit against former intelligence chief Lars Findsen.

There have been discussions about whether Greenland and the Faroe Islands, as constituent parts of the Danish realm, should have permanent seats on the committee.

== Composition ==
The Government Security Committee is chaired by the Prime Minister and consists of cabinet ministers. These are: the Deputy Prime Minister and Minister of Defence, the Minister of Justice, the Minister of Foreign Affairs, and the Minister of Resilience and Preparedness.

While those mentioned above are the only members of the committee and are entitled to attend all meetings, the prime minister may invite others to attend individual meetings. These have so far included the director of the Danish Security and Intelligence Service (DSIS), the director of the Danish Defence Intelligence Service (DDIS), the Chief of Defence and the National Police Commissioner. In matters concerning total defence, the Minister of the Interior has previously attended. At other times in history additional attendees have been other senior civil servants, such as the permanent secretaries of the Prime Minister's Office, the Ministry of Foreign Affairs, the Ministry of Defence and the Ministry of Justice. These now constitute a permanent subcommittee entitled the Civil Servants' Committee on Security Matters (Danish: Embedsmandsudvalget for Sikkerhedsspørgsmål), which supports and advises the Government Security Committee on strategic and political security issues. Matters discussed in the Government Security Committee are typically discussed beforehand in a preparatory meeting without ministerial participation in this subcommittee.

=== Official composition ===
Image	Member	Office(s)
	Mette Frederiksen (Chair)	Prime Minister
	Troels Lund-Poulsen (Deputy Chair)	Deputy Prime Minister Minister of Defence
	Peter Hummelgaard	Minister of Justice
	Lars Løkke Rasmussen	Minister for Foreign Affairs
	Torsten Schack Pedersen	Minister for Resilience and Preparedness

=== Additional regular attendees ===
Image	Member	Office(s)
	Michael Hyldgaard	Chief of Defence
	Finn Borch Andersen	Director, Danish Security and Intelligence Service
	Thomas Ahrenkiel	Director, Danish Defence Intelligence Service
	Thorkild Fogde	National Police Commissioner
