= Mink Commission =

Danish investigative commission

The Mink Commission (Danish: Minkkommissionen) formally the Commission of Inquiry into the Case of the Culling of Mink (Danish: Granskningskommissionen om sagen om aflivning af mink) is a Danish investigative commission set up by a majority in the Folketing in 2020 to investigate The Mink Case (Danish: Minksagen); the culling of all minks in Denmark during the COVID-19 pandemic. It began its work on 23 April 2021. The commission consists of national judge Michael Kistrup, who is chairman, as well as law professor Helle Krunke from the University of Copenhagen and lawyer Ole Spiermann from the firm Bruun & Hjejle.

The Commission delivered its report on 30 June 2022, stating that the killing of all Danish mink had no legal justification, and that Prime Minister Mette Frederiksen and the Danish government, particularly former Minister for Food, Mogens Jensen, had "grossly misled" the public, however it also stated that Frederiksen was not aware of the lack of legal basis when she publicly announced the culling. The report led the Social Liberals to threaten to rescind their support for the coalition government (thus resulting in a vote of no confidence) unless it called for a general election. A general election was held on 1 November 2022.

== Background ==
The Danish government, led by the Prime Minister, held a press conference on 4 November 2020 as part of the handling of the Coronavirus pandemic. At the press conference, it was announced that it had been decided that all mink in Denmark should be killed due to concerns that the Cluster 5 mutation, which was found in mink and had been transmitted to humans, would have a reduced effect on the at that time coming vaccines against COVID-19.

Following the decision, several law professors criticized the decision for not having the necessary legal authority, and called it a violation of the Constitution.

Based on the criticism, the Folketing initiated an independent investigation into the killing of healthy mink, and a political majority decided on 10 December 2020 to set up an investigation commission to investigate the Mink case.

== Terms of reference ==
According to the Terms of reference of a commission of inquiry into the case of the killing of mink, the commission has the task of:

investigate and account for the overall course of events and for the actions and involvement of all relevant authorities and ministers in the decision and execution of the decision that all mink in Denmark as part of the efforts to combat covid-19 should be killed immediately

(translated)

The commission will focus in particular on the 14 days leading up to the press conference, where the decision was announced to the public, as well as how ministers and other relevant people reacted when they became aware of problems with a lack of legal authority. Furthermore, an independent assessment must be made of whether there was legal authority to make the decision and whether anyone can be held legally responsible for the process. However, the responsibilities of any ministers are not to be assessed. The health or veterinary basis for making the decision itself is not part of the commission's investigation.

On 19 November 2021, the Folketing's Scrutiny Committee adopted an additional terms of reference, according to which the commission will investigate the police's use of an action card, which the police used to speak from when they called mink breeders with information that mink should be killed. It must be investigated by whom and why it was decided that the police should contact mink breeders outside infection zones and who decided to prepare the action card and when.

== Investigation ==
Following the commission's initial work on the review of around one million documents, the commission began questioning witnesses on 7 October 2021. A total of 74 people have testified, including 7 ministers, 3 special advisers, 55 officials, 7 police officers and 2 people associated with the mink industry. The questioning took place at the District Court of Frederiksberg.

== Report ==
On 31 May 2022, Ekstra-Bladet learned that the Mink Commission will criticize the Prime Minister's Office with Prime Minister Mette Frederiksen and Head of Department Barbara Bertelsen at the top, and will give harsh criticism to the Ministry of Food, Agriculture and Fisheries, with former Minister of Food, Agriculture and Fisheries Mogens Jensen at the top.

The Mink Commission submitted its report to the parliament's Scrutiny Committee on 30 June 2022, and determined that there was no legal authority to demand that all mink be killed, and found that Prime Minister Mette Frederiksen grossly misled the population on the press conference on 4 November 2020.

Despite the fact that Mette Frederiksen objectively misled the population, the commission concluded that she did not subjectively know it or intend to:

The Commission thus finds that Mette Frederiksen's statements at the press conference on 4 November 2020 were objectively grossly misleading, but that Mette Frederiksen subjectively had no knowledge of this or intention to do so.

The Commission stated that the Prime Minister's Office had acted "very reprehensibly" and that the Ministry of Food, Agriculture and Fisheries had acted "extremely reprehensibly", and found that 10 officials could be held accountable for negligence and misconduct, including the Head of Department of the Prime Minister's Office Barbara Bertelsen, Head of Department of the Ministry of Food, Agriculture and Fisheries Henrik Studsgaard, Head of Department of the Ministry of Justice Johan Legarth and National Police Chief Thorkild Fogde.

The Commission concludes in summary on the role of the Prime Minister's Office:

The Prime Minister's Office assumed an overall and governing role in the forced process, which led up to the press conference on 4 November 2020, and that the Prime Minister led the press conference and herself announced the government's decision to cull all mink, even though the decision came under the Ministry of Food, Agriculture and Fisheries. The announcement was grossly misleading in view of the lack of legal authority for the culling of mink outside the safety zones.
[...]
Overall, it is the Commission's assessment that the Prime Minister's Office has acted very reprehensible in the process, which led to the gross misleading of mink breeders and the public and the clearly illegal instruction to authorities in connection with the press conference on 4 November 2020.

The commission also found that as part of the process, former Minister of Food, Agriculture and Fisheries, Mogens Jensen, submitted incorrect information to the Folketing, as the Commission in the report finds that the then Minister became aware of the lack of legal authority on 5 November 2020, but in a hearing in the Folketing on 11 November 2020 states that this happened "during the weekend".

=== List of officials ===
List of the 10 officials determined to have committed misconduct
Name	Position	Ministry/Agency	Disciplinary sanction
Barbara Bertelsen	Permanent Secretary	Prime Minister's Office	Warning
Henrik Studsgaard	Permanent Secretary	Ministry of Food, Agriculture and Fisheries	Relieved of duty and summoned to official interrogation
Johan Legarth	Permanent Secretary	Ministry of Justice	Reprimand
Anne-Mette Lyhne Jensen	Division manager	Ministry of Justice	Warning
Tejs Binderup	Division manager	Ministry of Food, Agriculture and Fisheries	Warning
Paolo Drostby	Office manager	Ministry of Food, Agriculture and Fisheries	Warning
Thorkild Fogde	National Police Chief	Danish National Police	Relieved of duty and summoned to official interrogation
Uffe Stormly	Police inspector	Danish National Police	Warning
Birgitte Buch	Legal section manager	Danish National Police	Warning
Hanne Larsen	Veterinary Director	The Danish Veterinary and Food Administration	Warning

== Aftermath ==
Already two days before the publication of the commission's report, Mette Frederiksen announced that she expected a "fierce criticism" of the government, but at the same time concluded that there was no basis for proceeding with an attorney assessment of whether a minister had incurred any criminal accountability. This is in continuation of the fact that Weekendavisen on 23 June 2022 had published a draft of the report from the Mink Commission, which contained harsh criticism of the Ministry of Food, Agriculture and Fisheries and the Prime Minister's Office. On the same day as the commission's report was published, all right-wing parties announced that they supported an attorney assessment, while the Red–Green Alliance protected the government. Furthermore, New Right announced that the party had started a fundraiser to initiate its own attorney assessment of the commission report. In addition, Mette Frederiksen convened a press conference on the commission's report the following day.

The next day, the Green Left rejected an attorney assessment, while Mette Frederiksen acquitted herself at the press conference. She also announced that the cases concerning the 10 officials had been sent to the Danish Employee and Competence Agency, a governmental agency tasked with HR functions, for advice on whether disciplinary sanctions should be imposed and, if so, which ones.

On 2 July 2022, the Social Liberal Party also announced that they did not believe that an attorney assessment should be carried out, whereby there was no majority in the parliament to initiate one. In return, the Social Liberal Party issued an ultimatum that Mette Frederiksen should call a general election after the summer holidays, and at the opening of the parliament on 4 October 2022 at the latest. Otherwise, the party will vote for a no-confidence motion against Mette Frederiksen.

On 13 July 2022, New Right announced that the party had raised enough money for an attorney's assessment of a possible minister accountability.

On 24 August 2022, following advice from the Danish Employee and Competence Agency, Barbara Bertelsen was given a disciplinary warning, Johan Legarth a reprimand, and Thorkild Fogde and Henrik Studsgaard were relieved of duty and summoned to official hearings.

On 20 September 2022 Uffe Stormly and Birgitte Buch further both received a disciplinary warning.

On 22 September 2022 Tejs Binderup, Paolo Drostby and Hanne Larsen too all received disciplinary warnings, and the attorney assessment set up by New Right was published, and came to the conclusion that it can be expected that Mette Frederiksen and Mogens Jensen will be convicted of gross negligence, according to Section 5 of the Minister Responsibility Act, in an impeachment case.

On 31 October 2022 the Danish Employee and Competence Agency announced that national judges Jens Hartig Danielsen, Annette Dellgren and the retired Supreme Court President Thomas Rørdam will be in charge of the official interrogations of suspended National Police Chief Thorkild Fogde and Head of Department Henriks Studsgaard. The disciplinary investigations are expected to be completed in the spring 2023.

On 29 November 2022 Esbjerg Municipality announced that Henrik Studsgaard will be the new director of their Technical and Environment Department from 1 January 2023, which caused anger among mink breeders. The following day, the Danish Employee and Competence Agency announced that the disciplinary case against Henrik Studsgaard were terminated as a result of the fact that he was no longer employed by the state.

== See also ==
- Mink industry in Denmark
- COVID-19 pandemic in Denmark
- Frederiksen Cabinet
