= List of political scandals in Denmark =

This article provides a list of political scandals that involve officials from the government or politicians of Denmark.

== Thule Air Base B-52 crash (1968) ==
A United States Air Force B-52 bomber crashed near Thule Air Base in the Danish territory of Greenland. The aircraft was carrying four B28FI thermonuclear bombs on a Cold War "Chrome Dome" alert mission over Baffin Bay.

== Tamil Case (1993) ==
The case about family reunification in Denmark of Tamil refugees from the Sri Lankan Civil War. The affair led to the resignation of the government led by Poul Schlüter in 1993.

== Tibet flag case (2012) ==
The case of police action involving the confiscation of Tibetan flags in relation to two demonstrations in Copenhagen, in 2012 and 2013, against former Chinese Communist Party general secretary Hu Jintao's state visit.

== Danish mink cull (2020) ==
The Mink Commission was set up to investigate the culling of mink during the COVID-19 pandemic which eventually lead to snap elections (2022 Danish general election) following threats of a no-confidence vote against Prime Minister Mette Frederiksen from the Social Liberal Party.

== Impeachment of Inger Støjberg (2021) ==
Inger Støjberg, the former Minister for Immigration and Integration, was impeached by the Folketing for instructing the Danish Immigration Service to separate asylum-seeking partners.

== Operation Dunhammer (2021) ==
An investigation revealed Danish Defence Intelligence Service cooperated with the American National Security Agency to wiretap senior politicians, government officials, and government entities of certain European Union countries between 2012 and 2014.
