= Barbara Bertelsen =

Danish jurist

Barbara Bober Bertelsen R
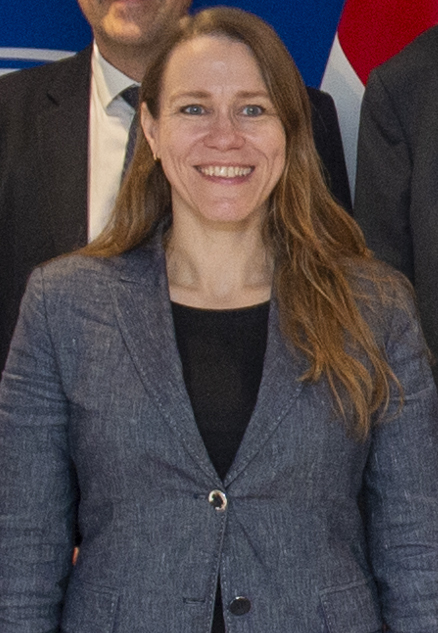

Permanent Secretary to the Prime Minister's Office
- Incumbent
- Assumed office 13 January 2020
- Prime Minister: Mette Frederiksen
- Preceded by: Christian Kettel Thomsen

Permanent Secretary at the Ministry of Justice
- In office 16 February 2015 – 13 January 2020
- Prime Minister: Helle Thorning-Schmidt; Lars Løkke Rasmussen; Mette Frederiksen
- Minister: Mette Frederiksen; Søren Pind; Søren Pape Poulsen; Nick Hækkerup
- Preceded by: Anne Kristine Axelsson
- Succeeded by: Johan Kristian Legarth

Personal details
- Born: Barbara Beatrice Bertelsen; 24 September 1973 (age 53)
- Spouse: Theis Bober (m. 2024)
- Education: Aarhus University
- Occupation: Civil servant

Barbara Beatrice Bober Bertelsen (known by her initials BBB; born 24 September 1973) is a Danish jurist and senior civil servant. She is the current Permanent Secretary of State to the Prime Minister's Office of Denmark, and as such the head and principal civil servant in the central administration of Denmark. She is the first woman to hold this position and thus the highest-ranking female civil servant in Danish history.

Born in Copenhagen, but raised in Esbjerg, Bertelsen graduated from Aarhus University with a law degree in 1998. A civil servant throughout her entire career, she started at the Danish Ministry of Justice upon finishing her education, steadily advancing in the ministry to progressively senior positions until 2012, with a minor secondment to the Prime Minister's Office early in her career. As newly appointed Deputy Director-General of the Danish Modernization Agency, Bertelsen became acquainted and worked closely with then Minister of Employment, Mette Frederiksen. When Frederiksen became Justice Minister in 2015, she appointed Bertelsen as her Permanent Secretary, and she continued in that position serving under four different Ministers of Justice. Following Frederiksen's electoral victory in 2019, Bertelsen was appointed Permanent Secretary at the Prime Minister's Office in 2020.

As permanent secretary, Bertelsen oversaw the expansion of the Prime Minister’s Office and its coordinating authority across government. She has played a prominent role in Denmark’s crisis management during the 2010s and 2020s, including the 2015 terror attacks, the COVID-19 pandemic, the 2020 mink cull, and the intelligence service (FE) affair. Her partnership with Mette Frederiksen has been described as unusually close, and their joint leadership has drawn both attention for its decisiveness and criticism for centralisation and a confrontational style. During the COVID-19 pandemic, she took early and decisive measures to address the crisis, but her management style, characterised by close oversight and direct communication, garnered acclaim and criticism. Despite receiving a warning in connection with the mink case for hastening processes leading to legal infractions, Bertelsen's disciplinary sanction was later rescinded.

== Early life and education ==
She was born on 24 September 1973 in Copenhagen. Bertelsen's parents were medical doctors, and the family moved to Esbjerg when she was one and a half years old. Subsequently, the family lived in Hjerting and later moved to Sønderho on the island of Fanø. She has a younger brother.

Bertelsen descends paternally from the Danish landowning family Dornonville de la Cour, which immigrated from France as Huguenots.

Bertelsen graduated from Esbjerg Statsskole in 1992. In 1998, she obtained a Master of Laws (cand.jur) degree from Aarhus University.

== Career ==
=== Early career ===
Barbara Bertelsen began her career as a civil servant immediately following her graduation from Aarhus University in 1998, initially serving as a head of section (Danish: Fuldmægtig) in the Police and Legal Office of the Ministry of Justice from 1998 to 2000. During this period, she also held concurrent positions, spending the first year as a police assistant at Roskilde Police and the subsequent year as an assistant prosecutor at the Public Prosecutor's Office for Zealand.

From 2001 to 2003, Bertelsen was seconded from the Ministry of Justice to the Prime Minister's Office, where she worked as a head of section with responsibilities in domestic affairs. Returning to the Ministry of Justice from 2003 to 2006, she assumed the role of head of section in the Criminal Law Office. Concurrently, from 2003 to 2005, she served as Secretary to the Future Police Vision Committee under the ministry.

Advancing in her career, Bertelsen was appointed as a senior advisor and deputy head of the Police Office at the Ministry of Justice from 2007 to 2008. Subsequently, she was promoted to head of the entire Policy Office from 2008 to 2009. Transitioning to the Planning and Development Office within the Ministry of Justice from 2009 to 2010, she continued her role as office head. From 2010 to 2012, Bertelsen held the position of head of the more influential and significant Economic Office within the Ministry of Justice.

Throughout these appointments, Bertelsen played a key role in implementing what has been described as the most comprehensive reform of the Danish police in recent times. She closely collaborated with various justice ministers, including Lene Espersen and Brian Mikkelsen of the Conservative Party.

In 2012, Bertelsen assumed the role of Deputy Director-General at the newly established Modernization Agency, succeeding the Personnel Agency under the Ministry of Finance. During her tenure, the Modernization Agency earned a reputation for its stringent budgetary measures. Within the Modernization Agency, Bertelsen led the employer pillar, effectively continuing the work of the former Personnel Agency. She represented the government in negotiations with state employees during collective labour agreements. Reportedly, Bertelsen also played a pivotal role in the government's intervention during the 2013 Danish teacher lockout, where she also worked with the then Minister of Employment, Mette Frederiksen.

From 2000 to 2007, Bertelsen held a secondary position as a teaching assistant at the University of Copenhagen's Faculty of Law, specializing in Family and Inheritance Law.

=== Permanent Secretary, Ministry of Justice ===
In February 2015, newly appointed Minister of Justice Mette Frederiksen selected Barbara Bertelsen as the new permanent secretary of the Ministry of Justice. Scheduled to assume her new role on a Monday the 16th of February, Bertelsen was compelled to commence immediately due to the terrorist attacks on the Krudttønden cultural center and the Great Synagogue in Copenhagen on 14 February 2015. Alongside Minister Frederiksen, Bertelsen undertook the exhaustive review and reassessment of Denmark's counterterrorism strategies. Additionally, she initiated a significant restructuring within the ministry's leadership team.

However, Bertelsen's tenure with Minister Frederiksen was brief. Five months after her appointment, a change in government occurred as a result of the 2015 Danish general election, with Søren Pind assuming the position of Minister of Justice. Bertelsen enjoyed a close working relationship with both Pind and his successor, Søren Pape Poulsen.

=== Permanent Secretary, Prime Minister's Office ===
In 2020, following Mette Frederiksen's electoral victory in 2019, she appointed Barbara Bertelsen as the permanent secretary of the Prime Minister's Office. She is the first woman to hold this position and thus the highest-ranking female civil servant in Danish history.

Her position as Permanent Secretary makes her ex officio Secretary of the Council of State, where she formally supports the functions of the privy council of Denmark.

Besides heading the Prime Minister's Office, the role of the Permanent Secretary involves assisting the outgoing Prime Minister in transitioning to a new government during upcoming elections, as well as aiding the informateur (Danish: kongelig undersøger, lit. 'Royal Investigator') appointed by the Monarch of Denmark, to investigate the possibilities of the formation of a coalition government. This includes coordinating the transfer or continuation of government responsibilities, a task Bertelsen undertook after the 2022 Danish general election.

Barbara Bertelsen's tenure as Permanent Secretary coincided with Prime Minister Mette Frederiksen's efforts to expand and refine the office's operations. This expansion aimed to bolster the office's effectiveness and influence in governmental affairs.

As permanent secretary, Bertelsen initiated reforms to address a “hastiness culture” and stress in central administration. In 2024 she co-introduced five guidelines with fellow permanent secretaries, aimed at reducing unnecessary urgency, safeguarding private time, and improving communication across ministries.

== Criticism and controversies ==
=== COVID-19 and the 2020 Danish mink cull ===
Barbara Bertelsen was heavily involved in addressing the COVID-19 outbreak in Denmark. Notably, she expressed apprehension regarding the early downplayed responses of the Ministry of Health and health authorities concerning the virus, citing international news articles and research literature to underscore the gravity of the situation. Bertelsen's proactive stance, observed before the virus reached Europe, has been characterized as atypical. Specifically, her concern about asymptomatic transmission and subsequent criticism of health authorities' optimistic outlook highlighted her meticulous approach to crisis management. In a communication on February 11, she admonished the Ministry of Health for conveying overly optimistic messages and ended with the phrase: "Hope is not a strategy." As the outbreak progressed, Bertelsen increasingly scrutinized the Ministry of Health's communications, perceiving discrepancies between their reports and developments in affected regions such as Italy. This approach to management, characterized by thorough supervision and straightforward communication, has garnered both praise and criticism.

Barbara Bertelsen also played a key role in the government's decision to cull all minks in Denmark due to COVID-19 Cluster 5 concerns. A commission of inquiry concluded, that Bertelsen took a leading role in the decision to cull all minks in Denmark, sidelining the Ministry of Environment and Food. Her rushed decision-making process and failure to ensure a proper legal basis for the actions taken, resulted in serious misconduct. After the Mink Commission's report, the government sought advice from the Employee and Competence Agency. On 24 August 2022, they recommended a disciplinary warning for Barbara Bertelsen, which the Prime Minister accepted. However, the warning was withdrawn in March 2023, following the conclusion of an investigation that determined the statements made in November 2020 could not be legally classified as an instruction.

=== Role in the Danish intelligence scandal ===
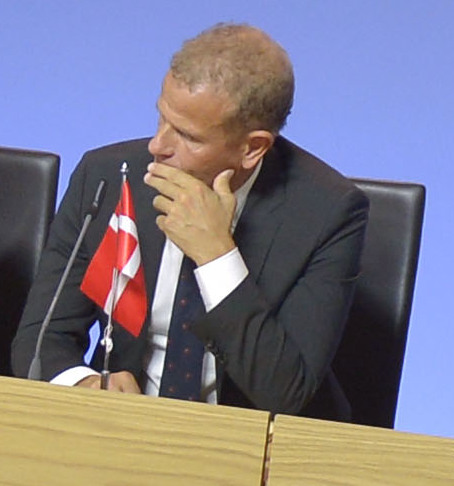
Lars Findsen, former director of DDIS, who reportedly had a very strained relationship with Bertelsen.

Bertelsen has repeatedly been named as a figure in the intelligence controversy surrounding the Danish Defence Intelligence Service (FE), which arose from revelations about Operation Dunhammer. The operation, completed in 2015, concluded that FE had cooperated with the United States National Security Agency in surveillance of European leaders between 2012 and 2014, but its findings remained undisclosed until media reports in May 2021. In August 2020, shortly after Defence Minister Trine Bramsen was briefed on the matter, the government suspended FE’s leadership, including director Lars Findsen, following a critical statement from the Intelligence Oversight Board (TET).

Reconstructions later reported that the decision was taken by Prime Minister Mette Frederiksen in close dialogue with her permanent secretary, Barbara Bertelsen. A commission of inquiry subsequently found no basis for the criticism of FE or the suspended officials. By that time Findsen had also been arrested and charged with leaking classified information. The prosecution, however, dropped the case in November 2023 on national security grounds, without judicial review of the underlying allegations.

In early 2022, confidential briefings of parliamentary party leaders while Findsen was in custody allegedly included intimate personal details. Politiken reported that the briefings were “sanctioned" by Frederiksen and Bertelsen. Former prime minister Lars Løkke Rasmussen later described the briefing as “unuanced” and containing “very private information” without relevance. In September 2022, Berlingske reported that the information disclosed about Findsen concerned, among other things, intimate details about his sex life and fetishes. Several commentators critiqued the briefings as unprofessional and akin to character assassination. As of 2025, the briefings form part of Findsen’s pending tort claim.

Former defence minister Claus Hjort Frederiksen, who was also charged in the affair, has alleged that Bertelsen urged action against him after he discussed a secret Danish–U.S. cable cooperation. In his 2022 memoir, Lars Findsen describes a long-standing hostile relationship with Bertelsen. Former permanent secretary, Michael Lunn, criticised the handling of the affair as displaying "a rare degree of recklessness".

No official inquiry has found misconduct by Bertelsen, and the claims advanced by Hjort and Findsen remain largely uncorroborated. Findsen’s memoir, in particular, has been described as a partisan account. Opposition parties have repeatedly called for an inquiry into the role of the Prime Minister's Office, including both Frederiksen and Bertelsen.

== Personal life ==
Barbara Bertelsen maintains a private personal life and refrains from publicly commenting on matters and rarely grants interviews. She married Theis Bober in August 2024 in Sønderho Church on the Wadden Sea island of Fanø, with Prime Minister Mette Frederiksen among the attendees.

== Honours ==
=== National ===
Denmark:

- Commander 1st Class of the Order of the Dannebrog (2025).
- Commander of the Order of the Dannebrog (2020).
- Queen Margrethe II's Golden Jubilee Medal (2022).

=== International ===
Egypt:

- First Class (Grand Cordon) of the Order of the Republic.

Iceland:

- Grand Cross of the Order of the Falcon.

Spain:

- Grand Cross of the Order of Civil Merit.

Ukraine:

- First Class of the Order of Princess Olga.

Government offices
Preceded by Christian Kettel Thomsen	Permanent Secretary of State at the Prime Minister's Office of Denmark; 2020–present	Incumbent
