= Danmarks Nationalbank =

Danish central bank

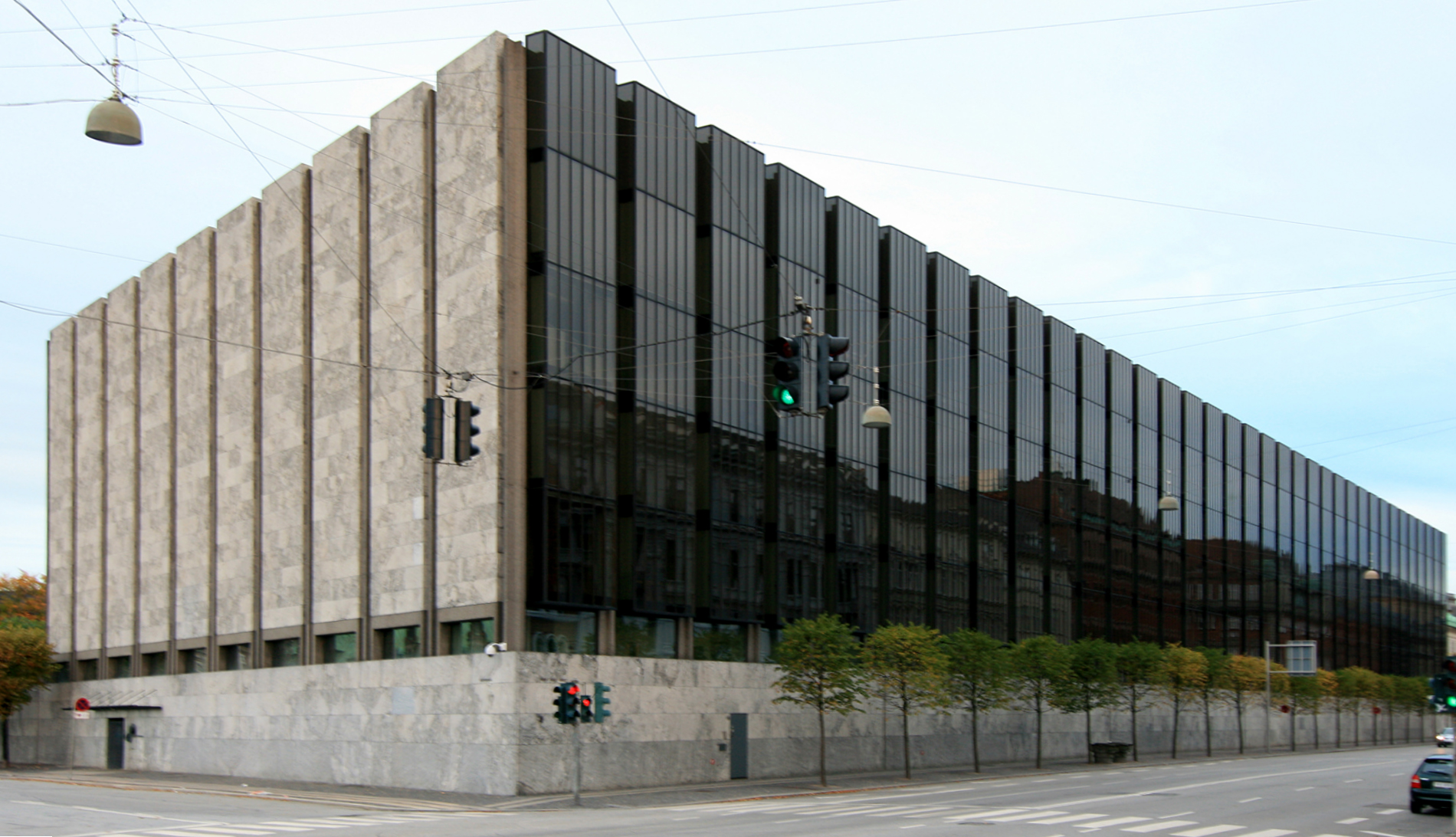
- Central bank of: The Kingdom of Denmark
- Headquarters: Havnegade 5, Copenhagen
- Established: 1 August 1818; 208 years ago
- Ownership: independent, self-governing institution
- Royal Director: Christian Kettel Thomsen
- Currency: Danish krone DKK (ISO 4217)
- Reserves: 479,065,000,000DKK
- Website: www.nationalbanken.dk/en

Danmarks Nationalbank (in Danish often simply Nationalbanken) is the central bank of the Kingdom of Denmark. It is a non-eurozone member of the European System of Central Banks (ESCB). Since its establishment in 1818, the objective of the Nationalbank as an independent and credible institution is to issue the Danish currency, the krone, and ensure its stability. The Board of Governors holds full responsibility for the monetary policy.

Danmarks Nationalbank undertakes all functions related to the management of the Danish central-government debt. The division of responsibility is set out in an agreement between the Ministry of Finance of Denmark and Danmarks Nationalbank.

It is also a member of the European Systemic Risk Board (ESRB).

== History ==
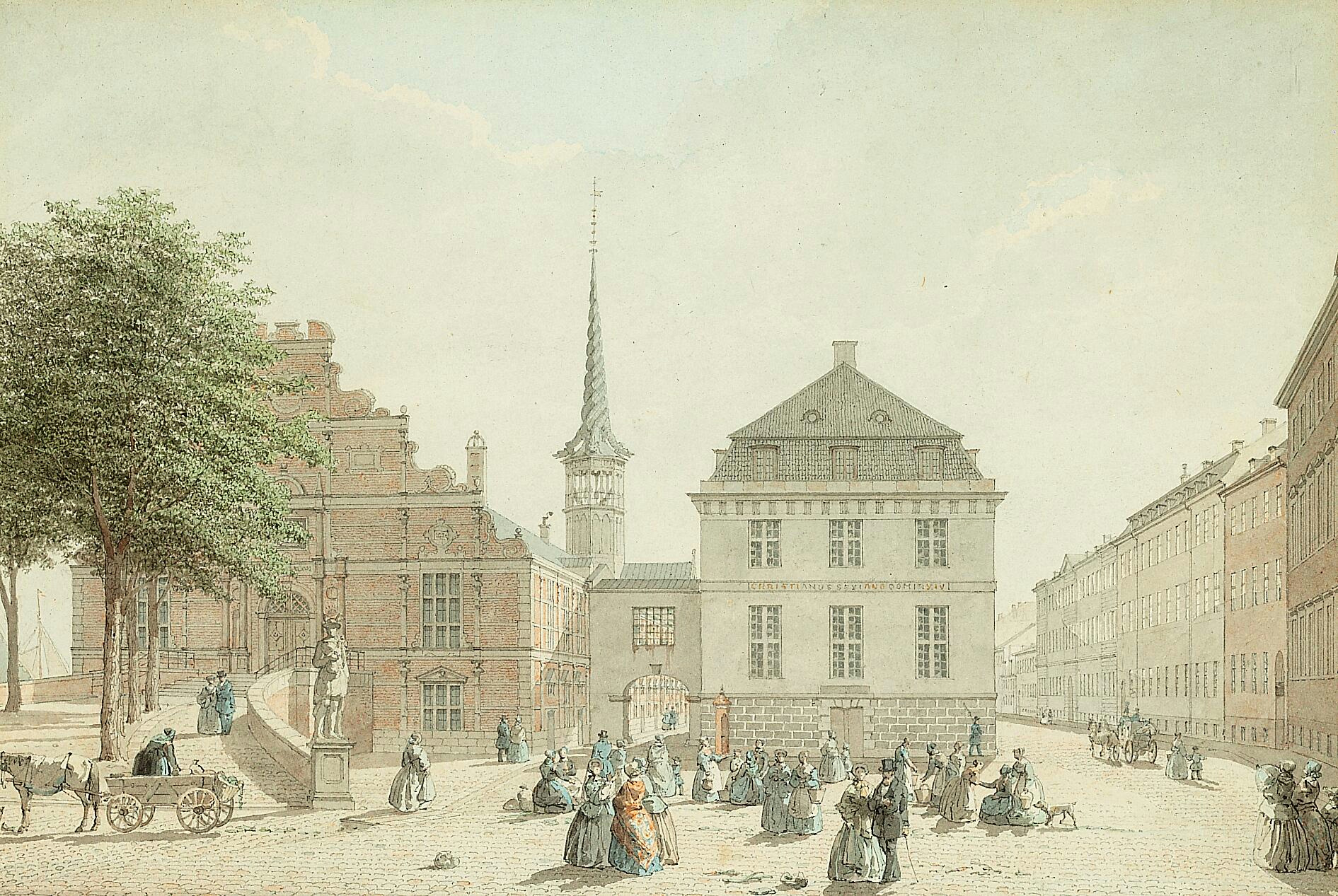
The National Bank's first home next to Børsen on Slotsholmen, c. 1850.

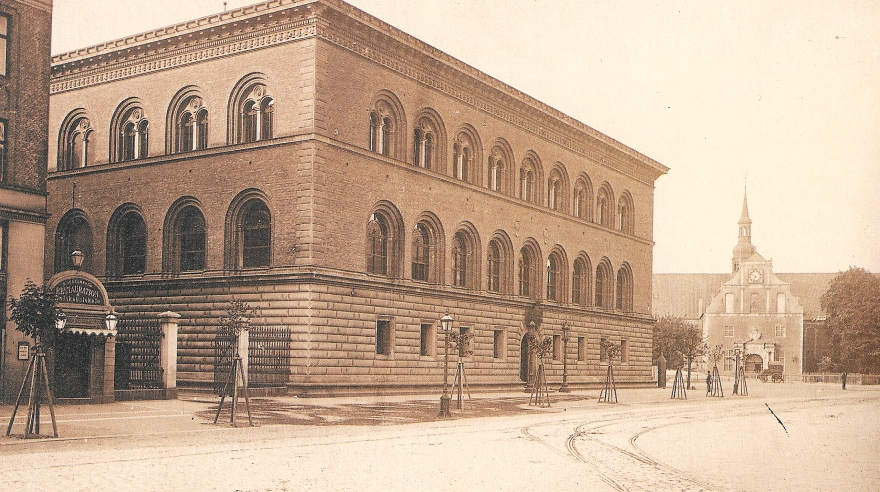
The National Bank's second home on Holmens Kanal 17

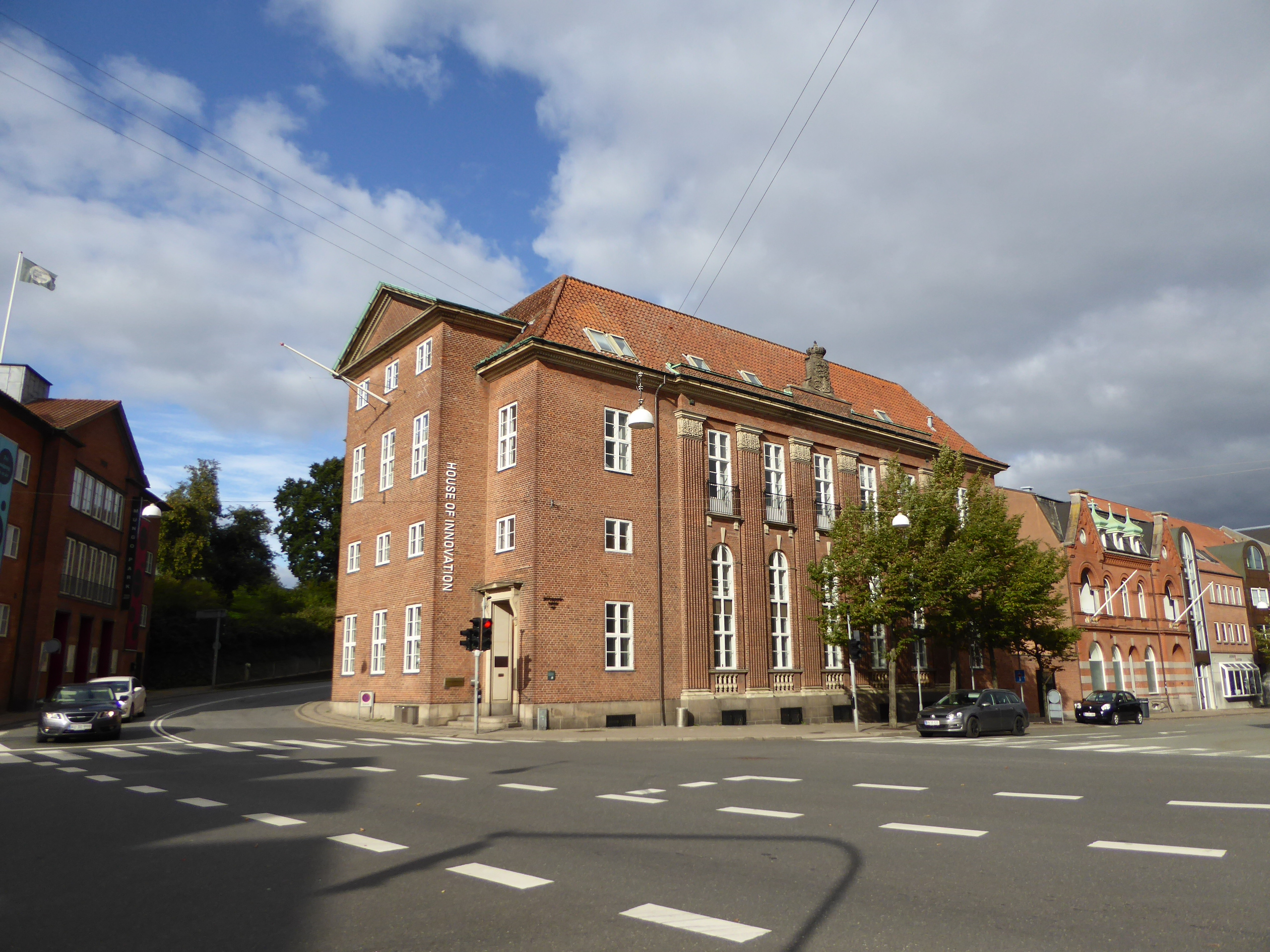
Former branch (1924-1968) on Jernbanegade 27 in Kolding

The bank was established on 1 August 1818 by King Frederick VI of Denmark. The private bank was given a 90-year monopoly on currency issue, which was extended in 1907 out to 1938. In 1914, the National Bank became the sole banker for the Danish government. The bank became fully independent of the government in 1936.

The National Bank established a network of branches in Denmark's principal cities, but phased them out in the second half of the 20th century as they were no longer needed due to evolving practices and technologies. The last two branches, in Aarhus and Odense, closed in 1989.

Until 20 December 2016, Danish and Faroese banknotes were previously printed at Danmarks Nationalbank's Banknote Printing Works. The printing of banknotes was then outsourced due to a reduced demand for cash, and cut in expenses of 100 million kroner until 2020.

== Building ==
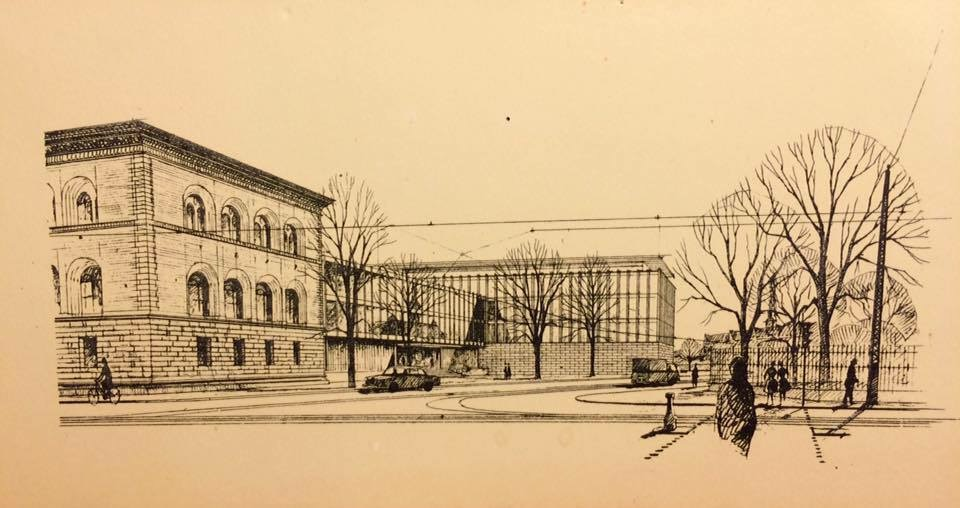
Competition entry for the new head office in 1961, with the older building preserved

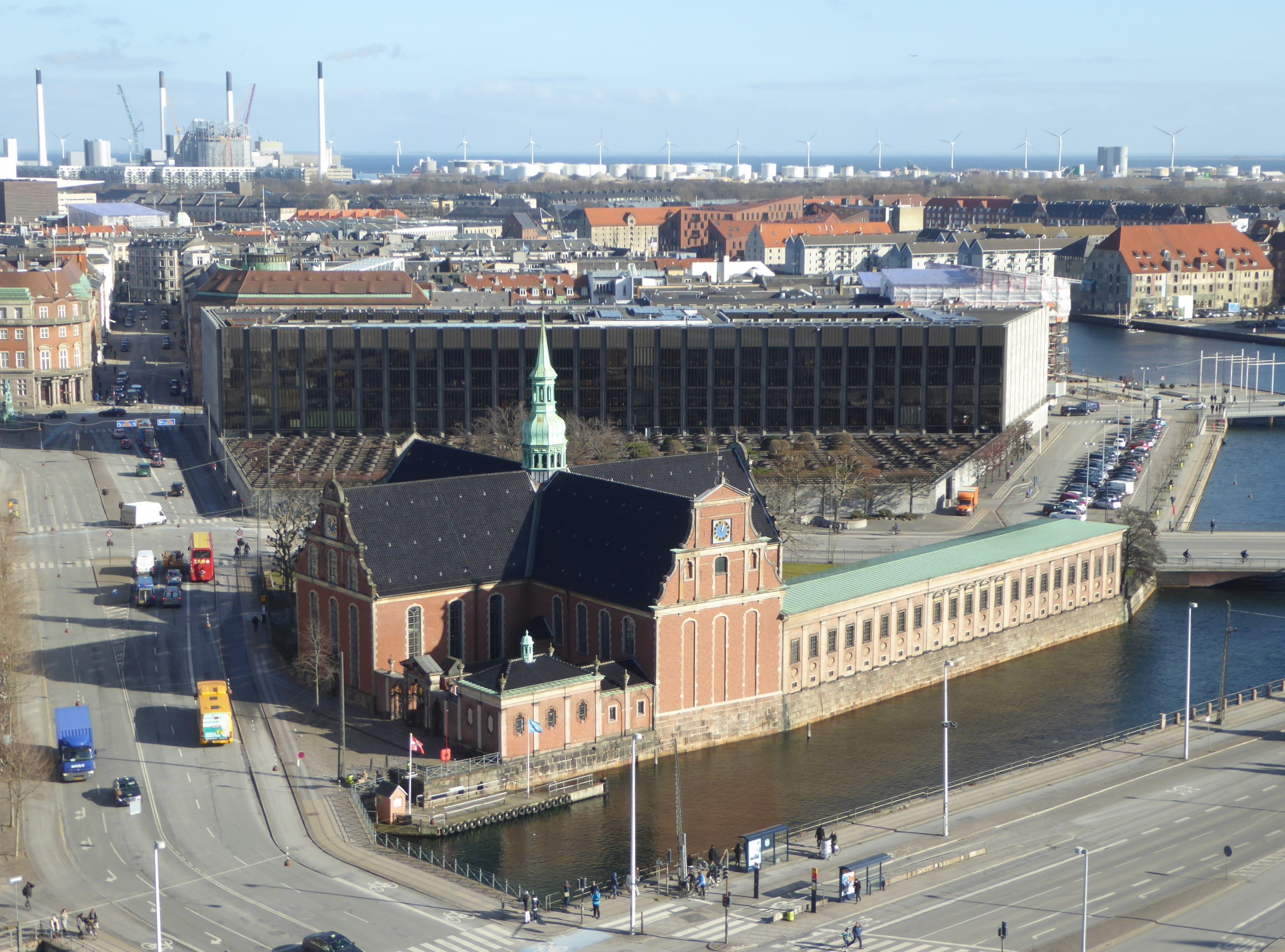
The National Bank building viewed from Christiansborg Palace, with Holmen Church in foreground

The building which currently houses the bank's headquarters was designed in the early 1960s by the renowned architect Arne Jacobsen, in collaboration with Hans Dissing and Otto Weitling, and built between 1965 and 1978. After Jacobsen's death in 1971, his office, renamed Dissing+Weitling, brought the building to completion. The National Bank moved into the new premises in 1976. The Agency for Culture and Palaces listed it as national heritage in 2009.

The new building replaced an earlier neo-Renaissance structure, inspired by the Palazzo Strozzi in Florence and designed for the National Bank by Johan Daniel Herholdt, which had been erected in 1866-1870. The National Bank had moved into this building in 1870 from its original premises on Slotsholmsgade, in a building (now demolished) designed in the 18th century by Caspar Frederik Harsdorff.

== Logo ==
The official logo of the bank is a nineteenth-century version of Denmark's coat of arms showing the insignia of Denmark, Schleswig, and Holstein. The two latter provinces were lost in the 1864 Second War of Schleswig, and the bank is the only official Danish institution still using this insignia. Since the late 19th century, coins minted by the bank carry a heart-shaped mint mark. Before this time, the Mint used a mark showing the royal crown.

== Board of Governors ==
The Board of Governors consists of three members. The Chairman of the Board of Governors is Governor by Royal Appointment. The two other Governors are appointed by the Board of Directors.

List of Royal Governors

- 1818–1818: Christian Klingberg
- 1835–1856: Lauritz Nicolai Hvidt
- 1821–1861: Nicolai Aagesen
- 1836–1845: Peter Georg Bang
- 1856–1861: Hans Peter Hansen
- 1861–1892: Moritz Levy
- 1868–1888: Wilhelm Sponneck
- 1869–1896: Stephan Linnemann
- 1873–1887: W.J.A. Ussing
- 1873–1896: F.C. Smidt
- 1887–1888: Carl Vilhelm Lange
- 1896–1913: Søren Christian Knudtzon
- 1888–1913: Rasmus Strøm
- 1896–1906: Johannes Nellemann
- 1907–1924: Jens Peter Winther
- 1908–1908: Ole Hansen
- 1908–1920: Johannes Lauridsen
- 1913–1939: Westy Stephensen
- 1914–1923: Marcus Rubin
- 1914–1924: Carl Ussing
- 1920–1923: Jens Peter Dalsgaard
- 1923–1931: Holmer Green
- 1923–1936: Hans Rosenkrantz
- 1924–1932: Jakob Kristian Lindberg
- 1925–1936: Frederik Carl Gram Schrøder
- 1935–1955: Ove Jepsen
- 1936–1949: C.V. Bramsnæs
- 1939–1957: Henning Haugen-Johansen
- 1949–1950: Holger Koed
- 1950–1963: Svend Nielsen
- 1956–1963: Siegfried Hartogsohn
- 1957–1985: Frede Sunesen
- 1963–1985: Svend Andersen
- 1965–1994: Erik Hoffmeyer
- 1980–1996: Ole Thomasen
- 1982–1990: Richard Mikkelsen
- 1991–2005: Bodil Nyboe Andersen
- 1995–2010: Jens Thomsen
- 1996–2011: Torben Nielsen
- 2005–2013: Nils Bernstein
- 2011–2020: Hugo Frey Jensen
- 2011–: Per Callesen
- 2013–2023: Lars Rohde
- 2020–: Signe Krogstrup
- 2023–: Christian Kettel Thomsen

== See also ==
- Economy of Denmark
- Economy of the Faroe Islands
- Economy of Greenland
- Economy of Europe
- European Exchange Rate Mechanism
- Financial Supervisory Authority (Denmark)
- Payment system
- Real-time gross settlement
- List of central banks
