= Signe Krogstrup =

Danish economist

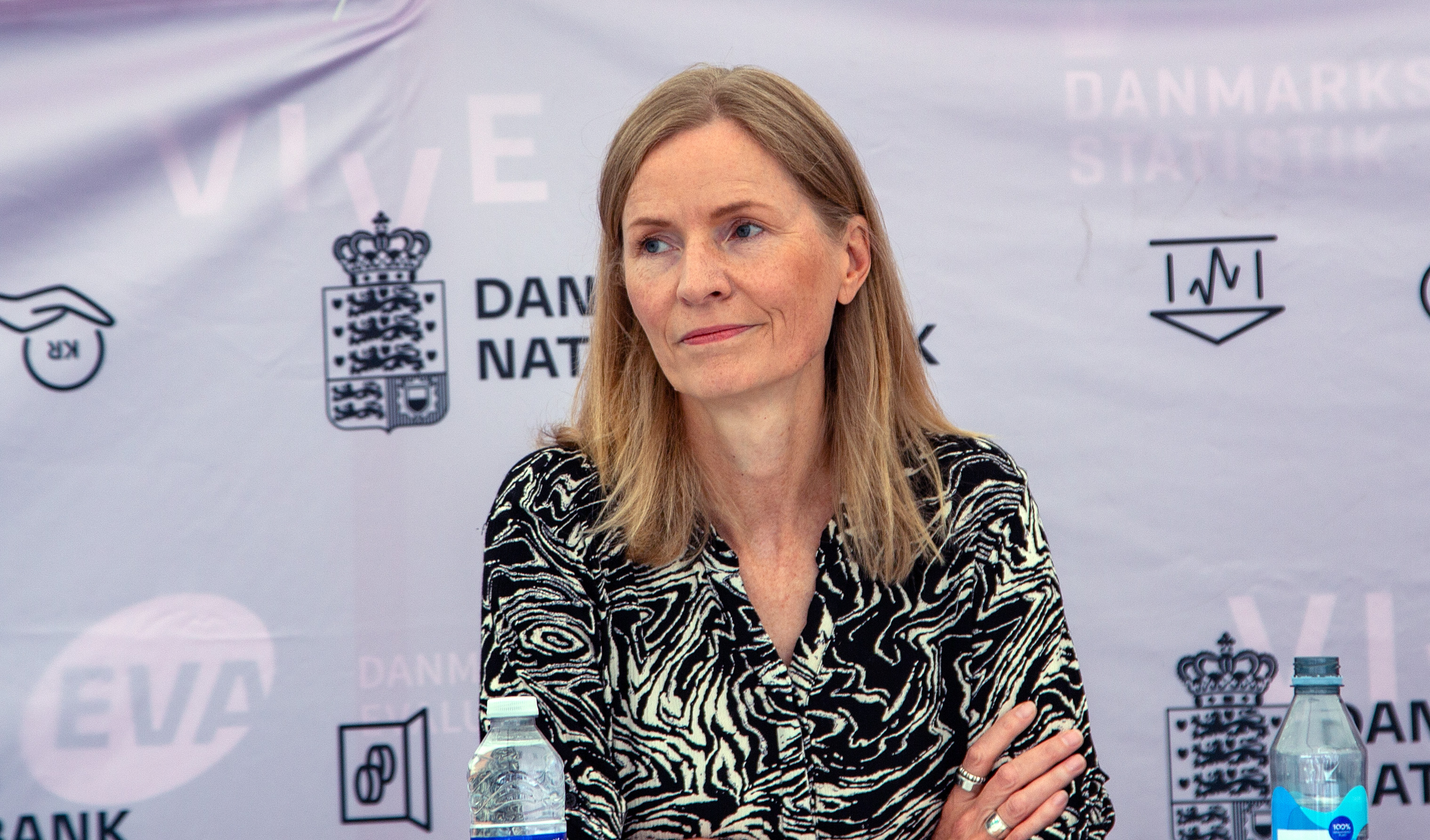
Signe Krogstrup in 2023.

Signe Krogstrup (born 25 January 1972) is a Danish economist and one of the three governors of Danmarks Nationalbank, the Danish central bank. Previously she has worked for the Swiss National Bank and the International Monetary Fund.

== Early life and education ==
Signe Krogstrup holds a MSc in economics from the University of Copenhagen (1999) and a PhD in International Economics from the Graduate Institute of International and Development Studies in Switzerland (2003).

== Career ==
In 2002–04, Krogstrup worked as an Associate Economic Affairs Officer for the UN-ESCWA in Beirut. In 2004–07, she worked at the Graduate Institute of International Studies in Geneva. She then joined the Swiss National Bank, first as adviser to the vice-governor (2008-2010) and then as a senior economist (2010–11) before in 2011 being appointed assistant director and deputy head of monetary policy analysis.

In 2012–13, Krogstrup served as an external expert on the Danish government's Committee on the Identification, Regulation, and Resolution of Systemically Important Financial Institutions in Denmark. From August 2015 to April 2016, on leave from the Swiss National Bank, she was a visiting fellow at the Peterson Institute for International Economics. In 2015–19, she worked for the IMF in Washington, D.C.

On 1 June 2019, Krogstrup assumed a position as Assistant Governor and Head of Economics and Monetary Policy at the Danish central bank Danmarks Nationalbank. In November 2020 she succeeded Hugo Frey Jensen as one of the three members of Danmarks Nationalbank's Board of Governors.

== Other activities ==
- Centre for Economic Policy Research (CEPR), Member of the Board of Trustees

== Personal life ==
Krogstrup is married and has two children (born 2005 and 2008).
