= Christian Kettel Thomsen =

Royal Governor of Danmarks Nationalbank

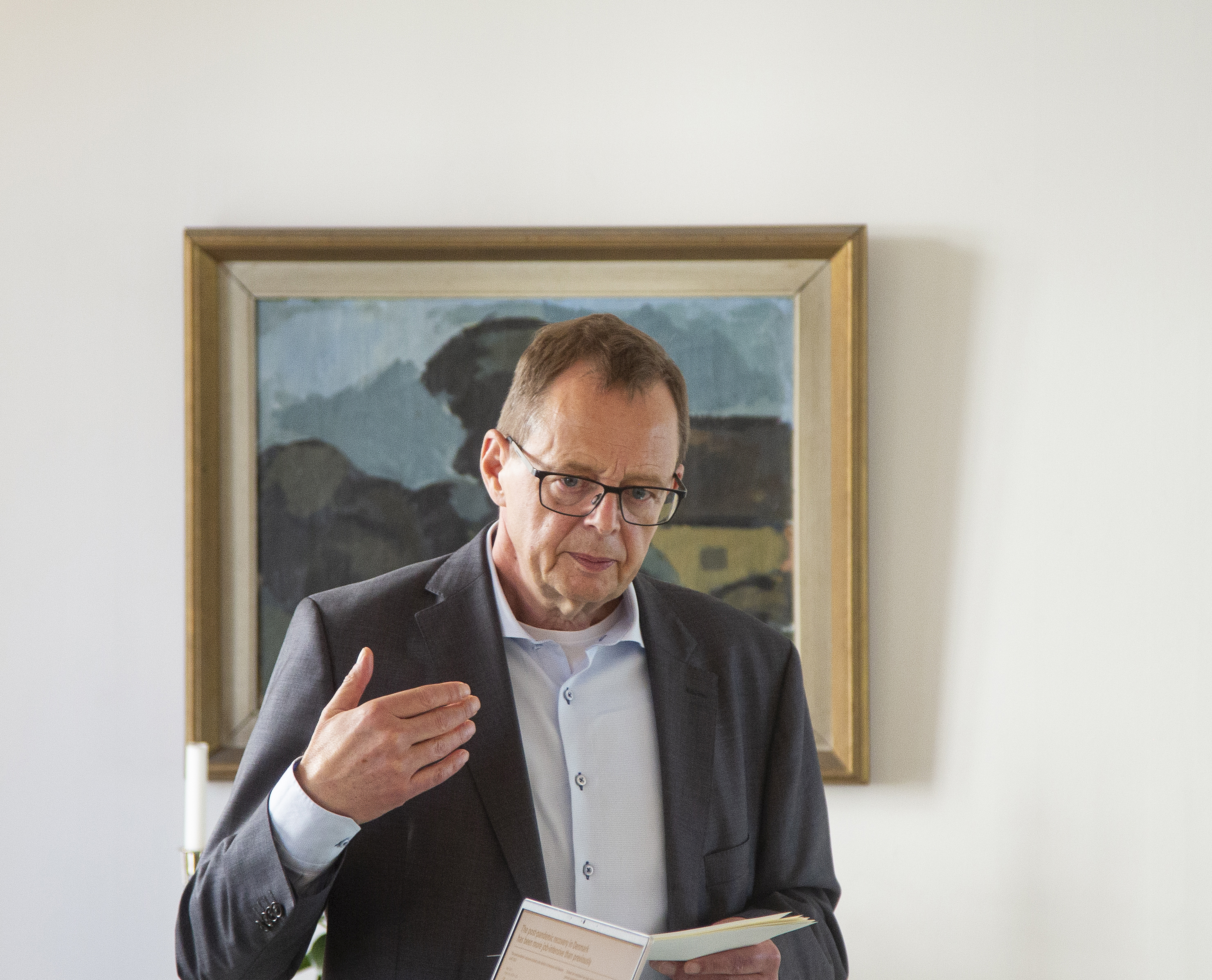

Royal Governor of the Bank of Denmark

Vice-President of the European Investment Bank
- In office 2020–2023

Permanent Secretary to the Prime Minister's Office
- In office 2010–2020

Ministry of Finance
- In office 2005–2010

Personal details
- Born: 23 August 1959 (age 67)
- Spouse: Dorthe Mikkelsen
- Children: 1
- Education: University of Copenhagen

Christian Kettel Thomsen (born 23 August 1959) is the Royal Governor of the Bank of Denmark. He has also served as Permanent Secretary at the Prime Minister's Office (2010–2020) and Ministry of Finance (2005–2010), and as Vice-President of the European Investment Bank (2020–2023).

== Early life and education ==
Christian Kettel Thomsen started his professional career in a somewhat unconventional way for a future department head, as he went to sea as a ship's boy for the shipping company A.P. Møller - Mærsk at the age of 16. He later advanced to ship's cook and steward, before retiring from the sea in 1985. Thomsen graduated with a Master of Science (Economics) (cand.polit) from the University of Copenhagen in 1991.

== Career ==
In 1991, Thomsen joined the ministry Ministry of Justice and Ministry of Business Policy Coordination. In 1994–1995, he was Personal Secretary to the Minister of Finance. In 1995–1997, he was Head of Division, Ministry of Finance, In 1997 say him promoted to deputy director of the Ministry of Finance (Thor Petersen). In 2002, he left the Ministry of Finance to assume a position as Permanent Under-Secretary at the Prime Minister's Office (Anders Fogh Rasmussen). In 2005, he succeeded Karsten Dybvad as Permanent Secretary at the Ministry of Finance under Anders Fogh Rasmussen. In 2010, again as Karsten Dybvad's successor, he became Permanent Secretary at Prime Minister's Office (Lars Løkke Rasmussen), and Council of State Secretary. In 2020–2023, he served as vice-president of the European Investment Bank.

== Personal life ==
Thomsen is married to Dorthe Mikkelsen. They have one son (born 1999).
