= Wilhelm Sponneck =

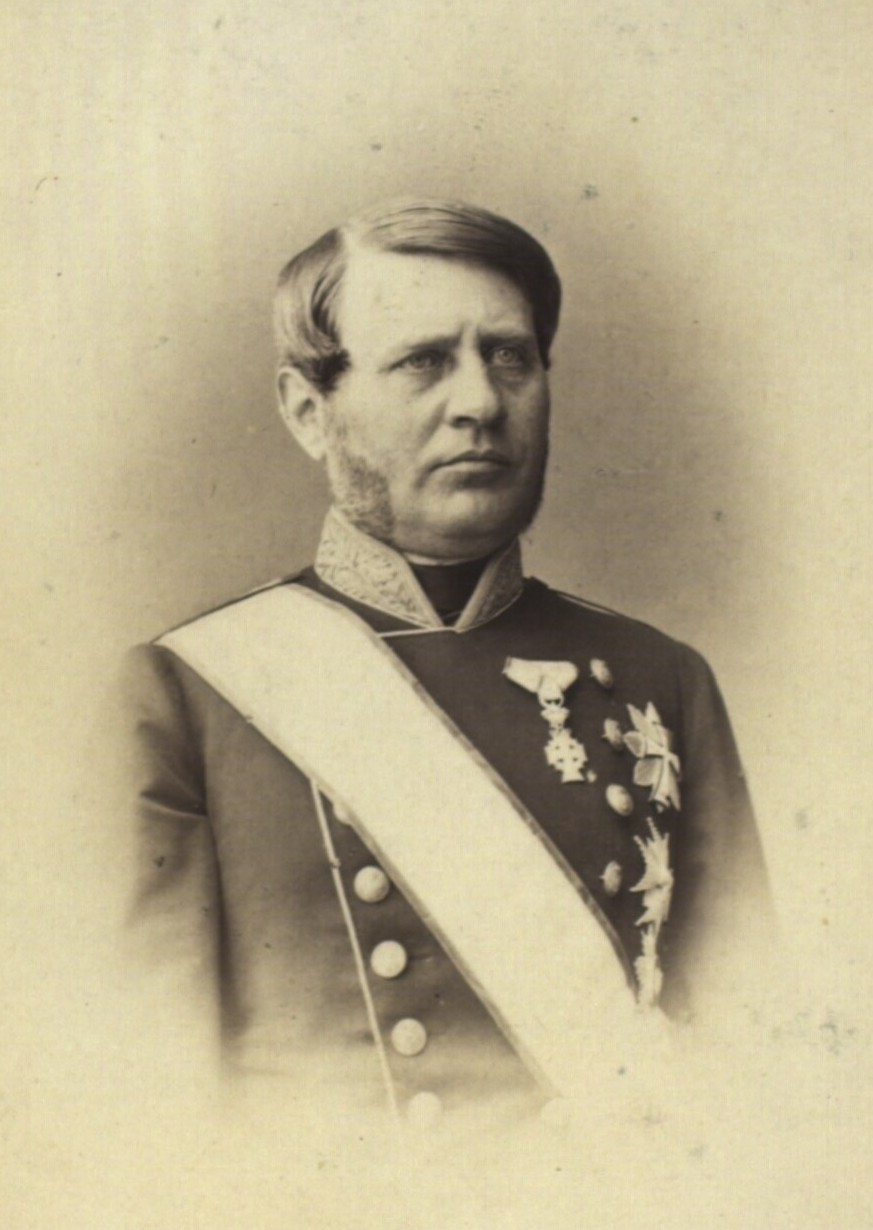
Wilhelm Sponneck

Wilhelm Carl Eppingen Sponneck (16 February 1815 – 29 February 1888) was a Danish nobleman (rigsgreve) and Minister of Finance. He was influential in Danish customs affairs for several years.

== Early life and education ==
Wilhelm Carl Eppingen Sponneck was born in Ringkøbing in 1815. He graduated from Sorø Academy in 1832, and entered into a study of the law. He received a law degree in 1836.

== Career ==
He was employed in the Danish customs service and rose to a leading position in the 1840s after publishing a 600-page work about customs services. King Frederick VII of Denmark appointed him to the Constitutional Assembly in 1848. Also in 1848 he was appointed Finance Minister, an office which he occupied in a total of five cabinets. He was first a supporter of the Unitary State with Holstein, but during the First War of Schleswig he switched to a pro-Danish policy, and in 1850 he enacted a temporary law removing the customs duties between Denmark and Schleswig, and later the same year, he enacted a similar law abolishing the Danish-Schleswig customs border altogether. In 1850-51, he tried to introduce the income tax, but was unsuccessful when Parliament rejected the proposal. Sponneck's proposal to introduce postage stamps was more successful; the first Danish stamps were issued in 1851.

In January 1851, Sponneck traveled to Berlin to negotiate with Prussia and Austria, trying to establish a peace settlement that maintained the Danish/Schleswig/Holsteinish union while securing extra close ties between Denmark and Schleswig. He was unable to secure a lasting agreement, and he abandoned his pro-Danish sympathies and returned to defending the pre-war Unitary State. In 1853 the Danish Parliament rejected his proposal to remove the customs border between Denmark/Schleswig and Holstein by applying the same rates everywhere. Sponneck reacted by enacting the law anyway, citing King Frederick's absolutist powers in the two duchies, consequently issuing the law in the name of the king. Parliament ultimately approved the law. He later tried to enforce the use of Danish coinage in Southern Schleswig and Holstein, a policy that gave him many enemies. His popularity dropped even lower when he in 1854 proposed a return to absolutist royal rule in matters relating to Danish-Holsteinish affairs. Sponneck left politics in 1854, and was appointed leader of the customs service, a position he occupied until 1863.

In 1863, he accompanied 17-year-old Prince Vilhelm of Denmark to Greece where Vilhelm had just been elected king as George I. Sponneck remained in Greece for a few years, serving as advisor to the youthful king. However, the Greeks soon came to dislike him due to his tactless behaviour, and George dispatched him back to Denmark.

Following his return to Denmark, he became involved in private enterprise. In 1866 he became chairman of the control commission for the Zealandic railways. In 1868 he became the director of the National Bank and joined the board of the Great Northern Telegraph Company. Sponneck later resigned these positions and became the leader of the newly founded Kjøbenhavns Handelsbank and chairman for the insurance company, Danmark.

Political offices
Preceded by Adam Wilhelm Moltke	Finance Minister of Denmark; 16 November 1848 – 12 December 1854	Succeeded by Carl Christoffer Georg Andræ
