= Permanent Secretary to the Prime Minister's Office (Denmark) =

Most senior civil servant in Denmark

Permanent Secretary of State to the Prime Minister's Office
- Statsministeriets departementschef
- Seal of the Prime Minister's Office of Denmark.

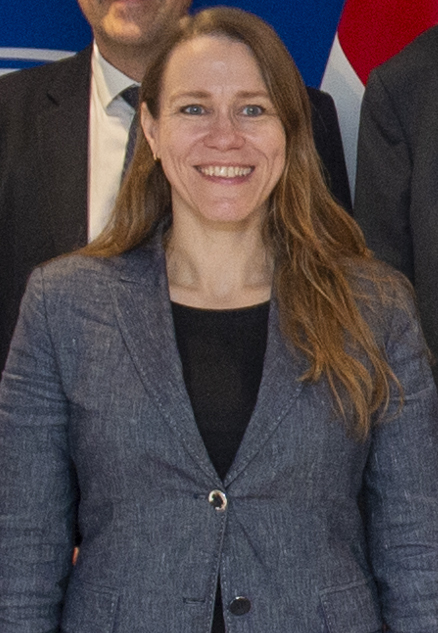
- Incumbent; Barbara Bertelsen since 13 January 2020
- Prime Minister's Office of Denmark
- Type: Permanent Secretary of State
- Member of: Council of State
- Reports to: Prime Minister of Denmark
- Seat: Christiansborg, Copenhagen, Denmark
- Appointer: The Monarch on advice of the prime minister
- Term length: No fixed term
- Inaugural holder: Erik Arup
- Formation: 19 December 1913 (cabinet secretary: 1848)
- Salary: 2,875,500 DKK (€385,600) annually

The Permanent Secretary of State to the Prime Minister's Office (Danish: Statsministeriets departementschef) is the most senior civil servant in Denmark and the departmental head of the Prime Minister's Office. The person is the senior policy adviser to the prime minister and the Cabinet, and as the pre-eminent civil servant in the Danish central administration, the postholder serves as the symbolic head of the entire civil service (Danish: embedsværket). Since 1913, the permanent secretary has served concurrently as the cabinet secretary of the Council of State, the privy council of Denmark. The role is currently occupied by Barbara Bertelsen.

The position is the chief operating officer of the Prime Minister's Office and as the secretary to the Cabinet is responsible to all ministers for the efficient running of government. In addition to the formal duties associated with the permanent secretary, the occupant also handles important constitutional issues during a change of government, assisting the outgoing prime minister in transitioning to a new government during upcoming elections, as well as aiding the informateur (Danish: kongelig undersøger, lit. 'Royal Investigator') appointed by the Sovereign to investigate the possibilities of the formation of a coalition government. During this transfer and reorganization of executive power, the permanent secretary oversees the continuation of government responsibilities.

The permanent secretary is formally appointed by the monarch of Denmark, following a nomination and recommendation by the government.

== History ==
=== Origin ===
Further information: Prime Minister of Denmark § History

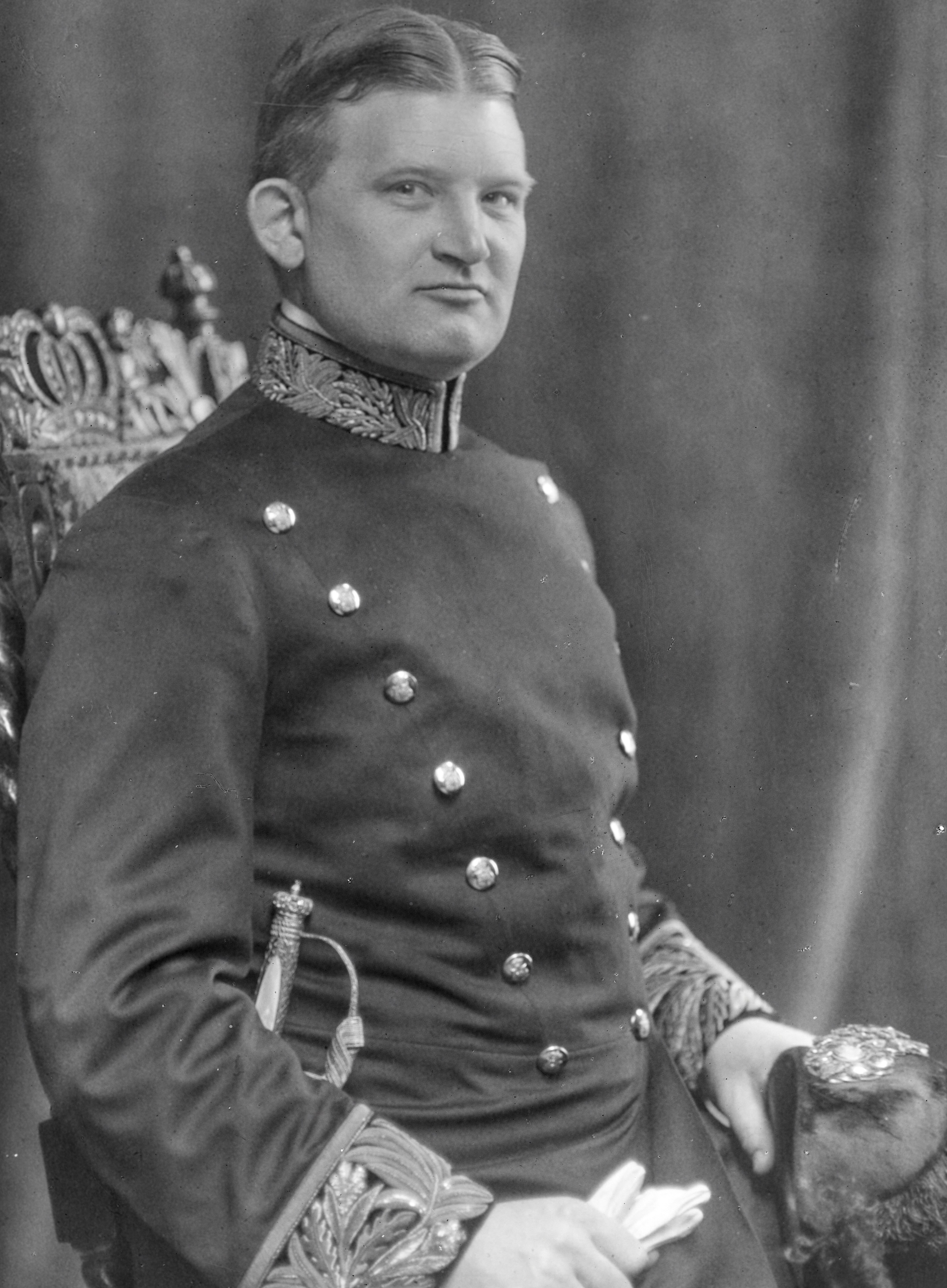
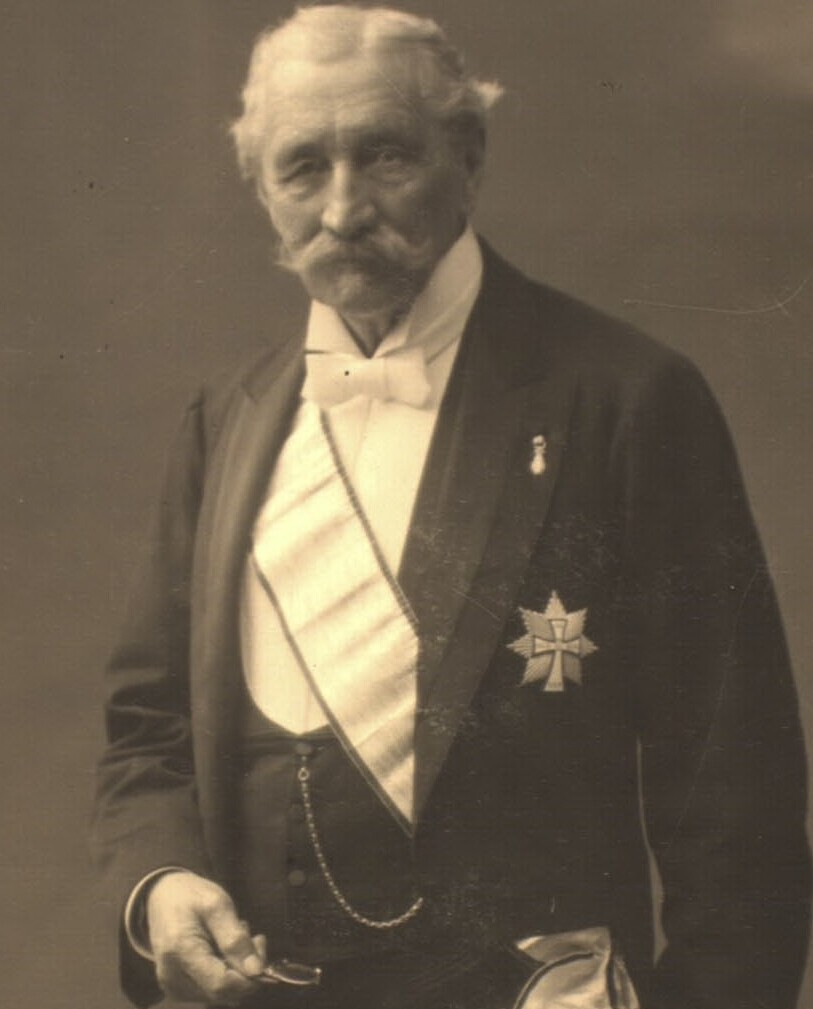
Erik Arup (left), the inaugural permanent secretary, who in 1913 assumed the duties of cabinet secretary, J.L.R. Koefoed (right).

The role of the permanent secretary to the Prime Minister's Office evolved from Denmark's early governmental structures established in the mid-19th century. Through the Constitution of 1848, the council president (Danish: Konseilspræsident) was introduced, supported by a senior secretary who assisted in administrative tasks (see list of officeholders below). Over time, the duties of the Council Presidium, the then cabinet ministry of Denmark, grew to include oversight of constitutional matters, ministerial coordination, and issues related to the monarchy, parliament, and governance. By the early 20th century, these responsibilities had become more complex, leading to significant administrative reforms.

In 1914, the Council Presidium was formally restructured as a cabinet ministry, and the position of permanent secretary was established shortly beforehand on 19 December 1913 by Carl Theodor Zahle, then Prime Minister of Denmark. Initially entitled the Permanent Secretary to the Council Presidium (Danish: Departementschef i Konseilspræsidiet), the office was created through a bill of parliament. The Act (law no. 291), the very final law passed in 1913, was expedited through Rigsdagen. Presented to the Folketing on 16 December, it was debated and unanimously passed (74 votes) in all three readings on 17 December, then swiftly approved by the Landsting the same day (48 votes). Ratified on 19 December 1913, it took effect on 1 January 1914.

The position of cabinet secretary (Danish: statsrådssekretær) was transferred to the permanent secretary to be held ex officio thereafter. Following the 1915 Constitution, the Council Presidium was renamed the Prime Minister's Office (Danish: Statsministeriet), and the title of prime minister (Danish: statsminister) was officially adopted.

Historian Erik Arup was appointed as the inaugural holder of the office, succeeding the retiring J.L.R. Koefoed as cabinet secretary. He similarly assumed the responsibilities previously undertaken by head of office Peter Colbjørn Feddersen, who had been the formal secretary to the council president since 1883. The cabinet secretary is an office that can be traced back to a rescript of 29 March 1848, which stipulated that the proceedings of the Council of State were to be recorded by an authorised cabinet secretary.

== Powers and responsibilities ==
The permanent secretary is the chief executive of the Prime Minister's Office, second only to the prime minister themself, and is responsible for managing the ministry on a day-to-day basis. They are the prime minister's closest advisor in all aspects of their duties, including domestic policy, economic policy, foreign policy, defence and security policy. The permanent secretary is ultimately the accountable official in the Prime Minister's Office (and the government as a whole) for upholding the formal duties of the central administration on governance, including principles of legality, truthfulness, and political neutrality.

The position is one of the key members of the powerful Government Appointments Committee (Danish: Regeringens ansættelsesudvalg), which was established in 1977 to assess applicants for all senior civil service positions in central government, such as permanent secretaries and directors of agencies. In several different governments, the permanent secretary has also served on other central government committees, such as the Government Finance Committee and Coordination Committee, as a representative of the prime minister, but with equal status with other high-ranking ministers, such as the minister of finance and the minister of foreign affairs.

The permanent secretary is the chairman of the Civil Servants' Committee on Security Matters (Danish: Embedsmandsudvalget for Sikkerhedsspørgsmål), which advises the Government's Security Committee on strategic and political security issues. The committee comprises top officials from key ministries, including Foreign Affairs, Justice, Finance, and Defence, as well as the directors of the Danish Defence Intelligence Service and Danish Security and Intelligence Service. It is activated and convenes regularly during major crises, incidents and other security events, where it coordinates the reaction and assistance of public authorities.

== List of permanent secretaries ==
=== Secretaries to the Council President (precursor position) ===
Individuals who, between 1848 and 1914, were the head of government's closest advisor and top civil servant. The holder was formally a secretary, usually seconded by a government ministry. Until 1859, the officeholders held royal appointment and the formal title of Secretary of State (or State Secretary; Danish: statssekretær).

No.	Portrait	Name (born–died)	Term of office			Ref.
No.	Portrait	Name (born–died)	Took office	Left office	Time in office	Ref.
1		Christian Frederik Julius Hegelund Liebe (1815–1883)	30 March 1848	3 March 1858	9 years, 338 days	
2		Hans Egede Schack (1820–1859)	3 February 1858	20 July 1859	1 year, 139 days	
3		Just Johan Holten (1831–1916)	1 July 1860	1 March 1876	15 years, 244 days	
4		Jens Laasby Rottbøll Koefoed (1832–1913)	1 March 1876	5 September 1883	7 years, 188 days	
5		Peter Colbjørn Feddersen (1846–1920)	14 September 1883	1 January 1914	30 years, 118 days	

=== Permanent Secretaries of State ===
Individuals who have officially held the position of Permanent Secretary since its creation in 1914.

No.	Portrait	Name (born–died)	Term of office			Ref.
No.	Portrait	Name (born–died)	Took office	Left office	Time in office	Ref.
1		Erik Arup (1876–1951)	1 January 1914	31 January 1916	2 years, 30 days	
2		Frantz Dahl (1869–1937)	1 February 1916	31 March 1919	3 years, 59 days	
3		Frederik V. Petersen (1868–1950)	1 April 1919	31 May 1938	19 years, 61 days	
4		Andreas Møller (1882–1954)	1 June 1938	31 March 1952	13 years, 304 days	
5		Jørgen Elkjær-Larsen (1912–1988)	1 April 1952	31 December 1964	12 years, 274 days	
6		Eigil Jørgensen (1927–2020)	1 January 1965	31 December 1972	8 years, 365 days	
7		Jørgen Gersing (1927–1987)	1 January 1973	30 April 1979	7 years, 119 days	
8		Peter Wiese (1933–1993)	1 May 1979	1993	13–14 years	
9		Ulrik Federspiel (b. 1943)	1993	1996	2–3 years	
10		Nils Bernstein (b. 1943)	1996	2005	8–9 years	
11		Karsten Dybvad (b. 1956)	2005	2010	4–5 years	
12		Christian Kettel Thomsen (b. 1959)	2 October 2010	9 January 2020	9 years, 103 days	
13		Barbara Bertelsen (b. 1973)	13 January 2020	Incumbent	6 years, 237 days	
