= Ministry of State (Denmark) =

Government ministry of Denmark

- Statsministeriet (Danish); Forsætisráðið (Faroese); Naalagaaffimmi Ministereqarfik (Greenlandic)
- Logo of Ministry of State of Denmark.

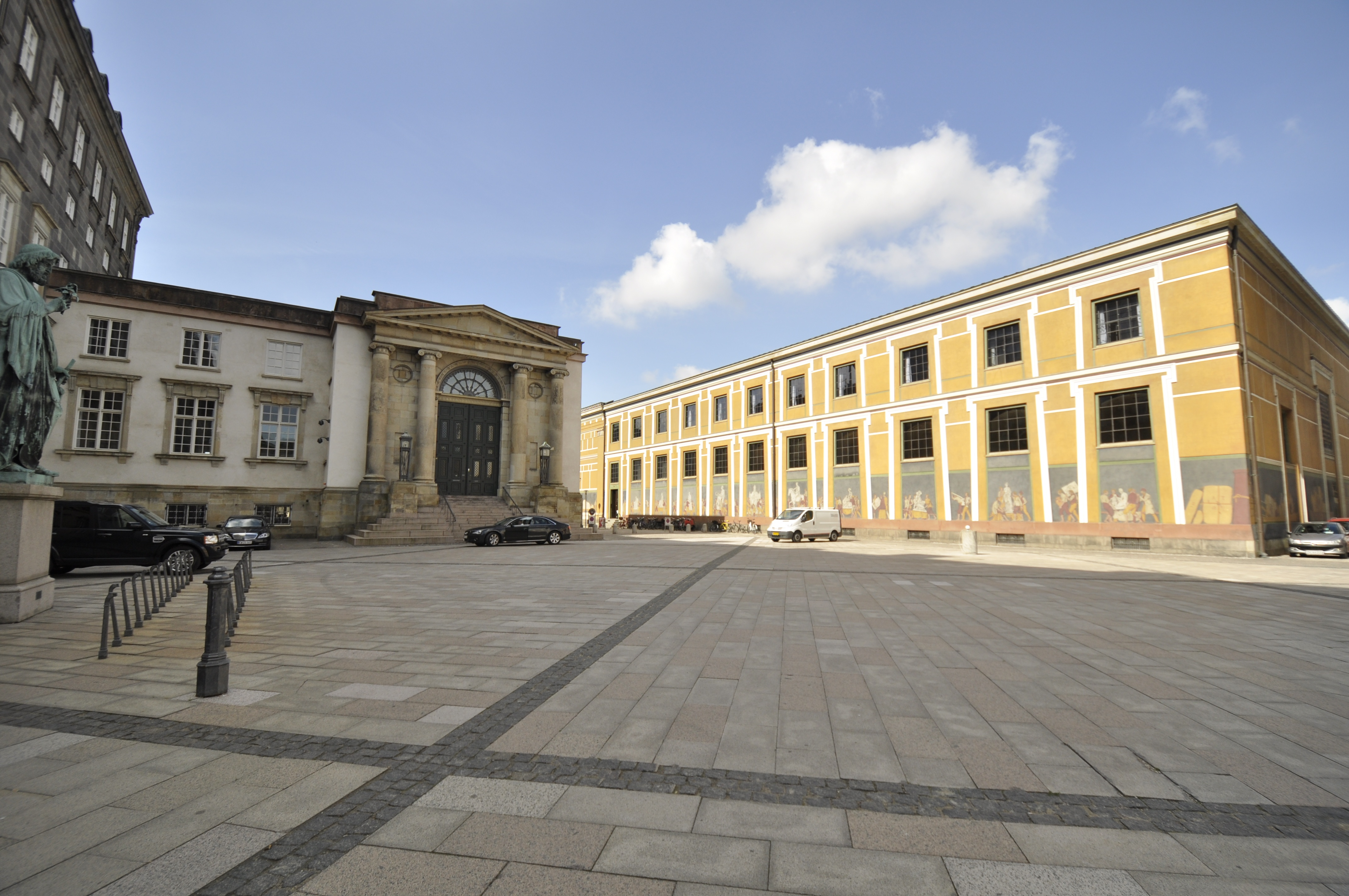
- Main entrance to the Ministry of State at Prins Jørgens Gård on Slotsholmen in Copenhagen

Ministry overview
- Formed: 1 January 1914; 112 years ago
- Preceding Ministry: Council Presidium
- Jurisdiction: Cabinet of Denmark
- Headquarters: Christiansborg Palace on Slotsholmen, Copenhagen.
- Employees: 104
- Annual budget: 127 million DKK (US$18.4 million) (2023)
- Minister responsible: Mette Frederiksen, Prime Minister of Denmark
- Ministry executive: Barbara Bertelsen, Permanent Secretary
- Website: english.stm.dk

The Ministry of State (Danish: Statsministeriet; Faroese: Forsætisráðið; Greenlandic: Naalagaaffimmi Ministereqarfik), also known as the Prime Minister's Office, is the cabinet ministry of the Kingdom of Denmark, tasked with assisting the prime minister of Denmark, as well as the Cabinet of Denmark and Council of State.

The department consists of the immediate staff of the Prime Minister of Denmark, as well as multiple levels of support staff reporting to the Prime Minister. Atypical of a Danish ministry it does not have any agencies, councils, boards or committees associated with it and its primary responsibility is to serve as the secretariat of the Prime Minister of Denmark, currently Mette Frederiksen.

The ministerial purview of the department extends over multifaceted domains, notably the relationship between Denmark, the Faroe Islands, and Greenland, as constituents of the Danish Realm, alongside overseeing relations and the legal status of the Monarchy of Denmark. Furthermore, it addresses constitutional and legal inquiries, the distribution of areas of responsibility between ministries, and ministerial appointments and dismissals, as well as other special legal issues not covered under other ministries.

The Ministry of State was founded on 1 January 1914, though its origin can be found in a small secretariat created in 1848, under the Council of State (Danish: Statsrådet) to assist the new Council President (Danish: Konseilspræsident), the name used for the Prime Minister of Denmark from 1855 to 1918.

== History ==
=== Establishment ===
During the period of absolute monarchy, the responsibilities akin to those of the modern Prime Minister's Office were overseen by the Danish Chancellery (Danish: Danske Kancelli), the sole governmental office for the kingdom, managing all state affairs. At the helm of the Danish Chancellery was the Grand Chancellor (Danish: storkansler).

Over time, this role evolved, transitioning into the position of Minister of State (Danish: Statsminister) from 1730 until 1848. But these titles did not confer formal head-of-government status, as the king retained absolute executive authority until the adoption of a liberal Constitution in the early nineteenth century. This transition marked the beginnings of the Prime Minister's Office as it is recognized today.

The establishment of the office of prime minister occurred within the framework of the constitutional monarchy delineated in 1848 and enshrined in the Danish Constitution on 5 June 1849. This constitutional overhaul introduced a parliamentary system, featuring a newly constituted bicameral parliament (Rigsdagen) and a Council Presidium, presided over by a council president. Notably, the Council Presidium is considered the precursor to the contemporary Prime Minister's Office. The inaugural council president, Adam Wilhelm Moltke, assumed office on 22 March 1848. Moltke and his immediate successors held the title of premierminister, with the Prime Minister's Office initially referred to as the Secretariat of the Prime Minister. Subsequently, from 1855 onwards, the prime minister was entitled "Council President" (Danish: Konseilspræsident).

=== Modern office ===
The inception of the contemporary Prime Minister's Office dates back to 1 January 1914, coinciding with the formal establishment of the Council Presidium as a department operating under the prime minister. Prior to this, the Council Presidium had functioned informally as a council convened by the prime minister. In 1918, during the tenure of Carl Theodor Zahle as prime minister, the title of the prime minister underwent another change, adopting the designation "Minister of (the) State" in alignment with neighboring Scandinavian countries Norway and Sweden, a title it retains to the present day.

Since its establishment, the Prime Minister's Office rapidly assumed critical responsibilities encompassing constitutional, royal, ministerial, and parliamentary affairs, enduring to this day. Under Permanent Secretary of State, Frederik Valdemar Petersen (1919–1938), the office expanded significantly, with efforts focused on broadening its remit and administrative capacity. Prime Minister Thorvald Stauning's 1929 vision of a future where prime ministers exclusively focus on governance, realized in 1935, set a lasting tradition. Following Petersen's tenure, staff numbers quintupled by 1955. However, new ministries saw functions and personnel transferred, resulting in a diversified portfolio by the early 1960s. A 1964–1965 reorganization saw the office temporarily operate from two locations before consolidating at Christiansborg Palace in 1980. The closure of the Ministry for Greenland in 1987 prompted a staffing surge. Further streamlining in 1994 focused on core areas, supplemented by a Climate Secretariat and administrative sector.

Recent expansions since 2019 aim to bolster the influence of the Prime Minister's Office, especially in relation to the historically powerful Ministry of Finance, although its organizational capacity remains limited compared to other ministries. Additionally, the role of the Prime Minister and the Office varies based on factors like government composition.

== Organization ==
Organizationally, the Ministry is subdivided into 2 superior units; the ministerial Secretariat (often referred to as the Political Secretariat), which performs a staff and secretarial function to the Prime Minister, and the ministerial department itself, which consists of 4 specialised divisions; the Foreign policy Division, the Domestic Policy and Coordination Division, the Law Division and the Administrative Division.

The Prime Minister's Office is headed by a Permanent Secretary. Since 2020, the permanent secretary has been Barbara Bertelsen, the first woman to hold that position. The two policy departmental divisions are headed by a Permanent Under Secretary of State (Danish: Departementsråd, lit. 'Departmental Counsellor.'), while the Law Division and the Administrative Division are headed by Deputy Permanent Secretaries. The Political Secretariat is headed by a Chief of staff, and is also composed of two special political advisors.

Traditionally characterized by a modest organizational framework, the Prime Minister's Office collaborates closely with other ministries, notably the Ministry of Finance. Some of the workforce of the ministry, comprises personnel seconded from diverse ministries, including the Ministry of Justice and the Ministry of Foreign Affairs. Since the 2019 government formation under Prime Minister Mette Frederiksen, the ministry has undergone significant expansion, augmenting staff and establishing new units. These developments aim to enhance the political influence and autonomy of the Prime Minister and the office compared to other ministries, particularly the Ministry of Finance.

Currently, the Ministry has a record high of 104 employees.

=== Foreign Policy Division ===
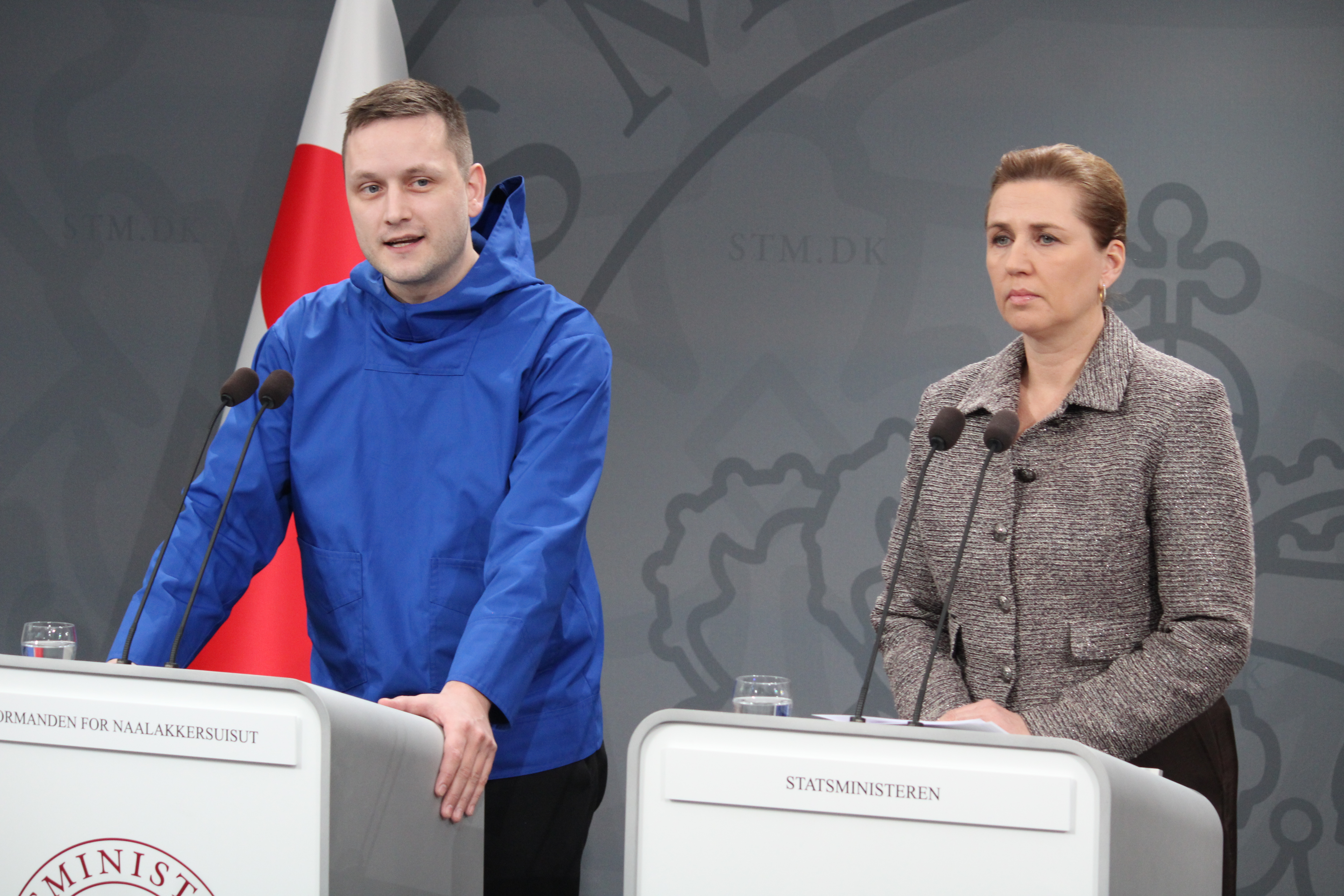
Spejlsalen in the ministry during a press conference with Jens-Frederik Nielsen and Mette Frederiksen, 2026

The foreign policy department is sometimes referred to as the "Prime Minister's No. 1 Office" due to its significance. Headed by Permanent Under Secretary of State, Anders Tang Friborg, the Foreign Policy Division oversees matters pertaining to the international domain, encompassing foreign affairs, security policy, national security, international economic concerns such as those within the European Union, global security affairs, Nordic collaboration, and issues concerning security and defense, including NATO. The Division also oversees tasks concerning the North Atlantic area, including Greenland and the Faroe Island. These responsibilities are managed by the North Atlantic Secretariat. The division also prepares and supports the functions of the Government Security Council.

The chief of the Division serves a role similar to that of the National Security Advisor in the United States.

=== Domestic Policy and Coordination Division ===
The Domestic Policy and Coordination Division's responsibilities encompass government coordination, development, welfare, and social security, with a focus on green transition. The Economic Policy Division is also incorporated into the section. The Division is tasked with handling domestic policy matters, economic issues, and the coordination of materials for cabinet meetings, legislative programs, and the Government's Coordination Committee. It also oversees cases for the Council of State, as well as managing press affairs.

Due to the career transitions of two Permanent Under Secretaries of State, Christian Liebing and Martin Madsen, who were respectively responsible for domestic policy and economic policy, Permanent Under Secretary of State, Pelle Pape's division for government coordination and development has assumed these areas of responsibility.

=== Law Division ===
The Law Division is tasked with oversight of constitutional law, government formation processes, ministerial affairs, portfolio distribution, matters concerning freedom of information access to documents, and legislation under the purview of the Prime Minister's Office. Furthermore, it offers legal guidance to aid the operations of other divisions within the office.

=== Administrative Division ===
The Administrative Division is charged with overseeing all administrative functions within the Prime Minister's Office. This encompasses personnel management, budgetary matters, accounting, information technology management, record-keeping, library services, supervision of ministerial officers’ spaces, and management of the office canteen. Additionally, the division carries out various tasks related to ministers, such as handling remuneration and pension matters, as well as duties concerning the Danish royal family, including budget management, civil list annuity administration, VAT refunds, and similar responsibilities. Moreover, the division is involved in matters pertaining to orders and decorations, including the recommendation and processing of decorations.

== Principal officials in the Prime Minister's Office ==
The following individuals constitute the senior departmental team.

Senior officials in the Office of the Prime Minister of Denmark
Name	Rank	Position
Barbara Bertelsen	Permanent Secretary of State	Head of the ministerial department
Martin Justesen	Chief of staff	Head of the Political Secretariat
Jean-Charles Ellermann-Kingombe	Permanent Under-Secretary of State	Head of the Foreign Policy Division
Pelle Pape	Permanent Under Secretary of State	Head of the Domestic Policy and Coordination Division
Henrik Skovgaard-Petersen	Commissioner (Danish: Kommitteret)	Head of the Law Division.
Pernille Harden	Deputy Permanent Secretary	Head of the Administrative Division
Nana Zarthine Christensen	Special adviser	Political and communication advisor
Peter Strauss Jørgensen	Special adviser	Political and communication advisor

== See also ==
- High Commission of Denmark, Nuuk
- High Commission of Denmark, Tórshavn
