= Permanent Secretary (Denmark) =

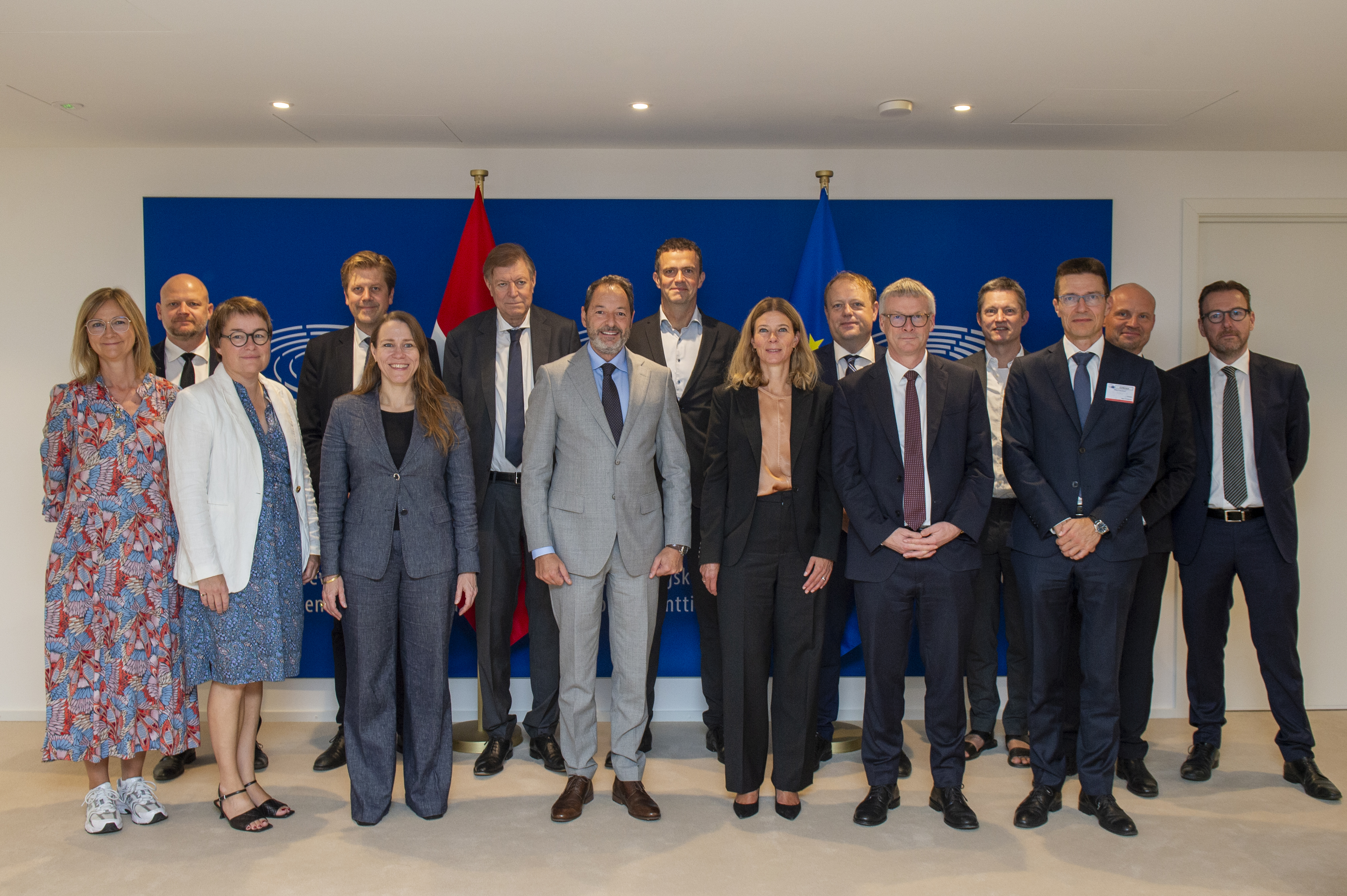

The Permanent Secretary (Danish: Departementschef) is the most senior civil servant of a Danish Government ministry, charged with running the department on a day-to-day basis.

== Current Permanent Secretaries ==
Government ministry	Permanent Secretary	Since	Ref.
Prime Minister's Office	Barbara Bertelsen	13 January 2020	
Ministry of Defence	Pernille Langeberg (act.)	11 August 2023	
Ministry of Economic and Business Affairs	Michael Dithmer	28 November 2016	
Ministry of Employment	Søren Kryhlmand	4 March 2020	
Ministry of Finance	Peter Stensgaard Mørch	21 August 2019	
Ministry of Food, Agriculture and Fisheries	Henrik Kjærgaard	10 June 2025	
Ministry of Justice	Johan Kristian Legarth	1 March 2020	
Ministry of the Interior and Housing	Sophus Garfiel	21 January 2021	
Ministry of Climate, Energy and Utilities	Lars Frelle-Petersen	1 January 2021	
Ministry of Culture	Dorte Nøhr Andersen	18 May 2020	
Ministry of Environment	Annemarie Lauritsen	1 April 2023	
Ministry of Taxation	Jens Brøchner	29 Maj 2012	
Ministry of Social Affairs and the Elderly	Jens Strunge Bonde	21 January 2021	
Ministry of Transport	Jacob Heinsen	21 January 2021	
Ministry of Foreign Affairs	Lars Gert Lose	1 January 2019	
Ministry of Refugee and Immigration	Christian Hesthaven	1 November 2018	
Ministry of Higher Education and Research	Hanne Meldgaard	1 January 2020	
Ministry of Health	Svend Særkjær	11 January 2021	
Ministry for Children and Education	Birgitte Hansen	5 December 2019	
Ministry for Ecclesiastical Affairs	Christian Dons Christensen	1 February 2017	
