= Ministry of Finance (Denmark) =

Government ministry of Denmark

- Finansministeriet (Danish)
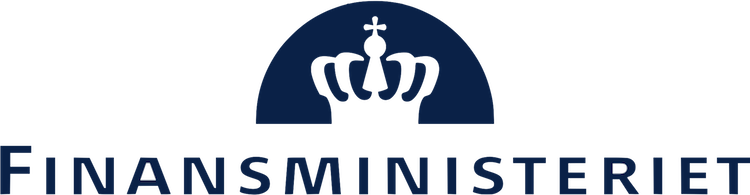

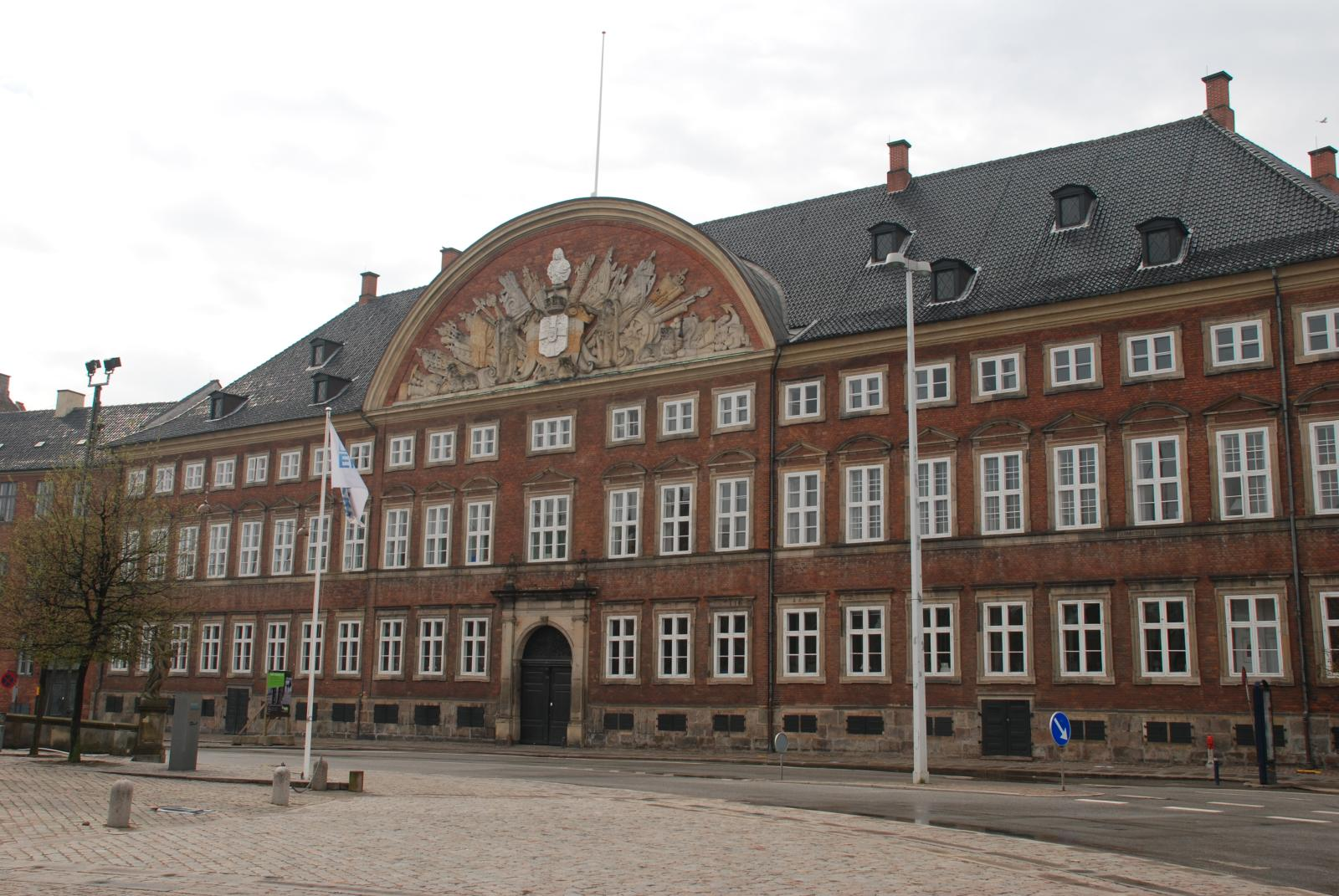
- Headquarters, Slotsholmsgade, Copenhagen

Ministerial Department overview
- Formed: 1848
- Jurisdiction: Kingdom of Denmark
- Headquarters: Christiansborg Slotsplads 1 Slotsholmen, Copenhagen
- Minister responsible: Peter Hummelgaard, Minister of Finances
- Ministerial Department executive: Martin Præstegaard, Permanent Secretary
- Website: fm.dk

The Ministry of Finance of Denmark (Danish: Finansministeriet) is a ministry in the Government of Denmark. Among other things, it is in charge of the government budget (subject to approval by the Danish parliament, Folketinget), paying government employees and improving efficiency in government administration. The current Finance Minister of Denmark is Nicolai Wammen.

== History ==
In 1848 King Frederik VII converted the nation's government to a constitutional monarchy, and its old administrative system was converted into a ministerial system. As a result, the Ministry of Finance was established on 24 November 1848. At the time, it was the largest of the government's ministries. The new ministry was immediately tasked with creating the first annual state budget proposal to be voted on by the Rigsdagen. The project was overseen by Minister Wilhelm Sponneck, who was 33 years-old at the time he was appointed.

As the amount of money going into the state budget has increased, the ministry has expanded to manage it. In 1968, the Ministry of Finance was split into the Ministry of Finance and the Ministry of State payroll and pension services. The latter was repealed on 11 October 1971, and the area was transferred to the newly created Budget Ministry, which from 1973 was again placed under the Ministry of Finance.

== Organisation ==
=== Leadership ===
The ministry is headed by the Finance Minister of Denmark (Danish: Finansministeren), a member of the Cabinet. As head of the ministry, the minister has responsibility for the ministry's tasks of administering the state finances via the fiscal policy, and making economic predictions and recommendations. The current Finance Minister is Nicolai Wammen, appointed by Mette Frederiksen on 27 June 2019.

=== Agencies and departments ===
- Agency for Governmental Administration (Statens Administration)
- Agency for Governmental IT Services (Statens IT)
- Agency for Public Finance and Management (Økonomistyrelsen)
- Danish Employee and Competence Agency (Medarbejder- og Kompetencestyrelsen)
- Danish Research Institute for Economic Analysis and Modelling (DREAM)

=== Companies under the Ministry's ownership ===
Company	Ownership	Nationality
Danske Spil A/S	80,1%	Denmark
Evida Holding A/S	100%	Denmark
Staten og Kommunernes Indkøbscentral A/S	55%	Denmark
Statens Ejendomssalg A/S	100%	Denmark
Ørsted A/S	50,1%	Denmark
Kalaallit Airports International A/S	33,3%	Greenland
Københavns Lufthavne A/S	39,2%	Denmark
SAS AB	25,8%	Sweden

== See also ==
- List of ministers for finance (Denmark)
