= Prime Minister of Denmark =

Head of government

- Danmarks statsminister
- Coat of arms of Denmark

- State Flag of Denmark

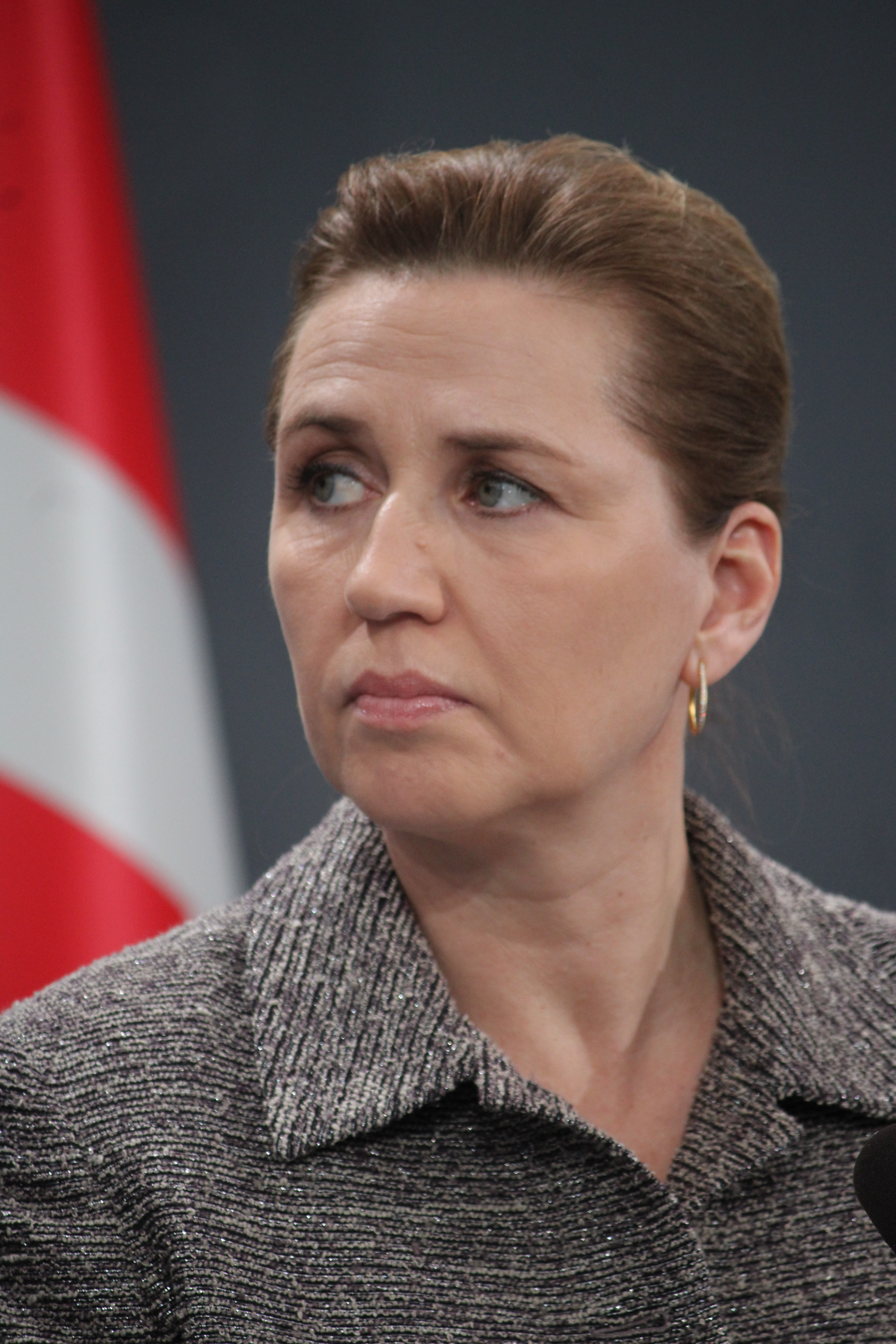
- Incumbent; Mette Frederiksen since 27 June 2019
- Executive branch of the Danish Government; Ministry of the State
- Style: His/her Excellency (diplomatic, outside Denmark)
- Member of: Council of State; Cabinet; European Council
- Residence: Marienborg
- Seat: Christiansborg, Copenhagen, Denmark
- Appointer: The Monarch; Based on Appointee's ability to gain majority support in the Folketing
- Term length: No fixed term
- Precursor: Privy Councillor
- Formation: 22 March 1848; 178 years ago
- First holder: Adam Wilhelm Moltke
- Succession: by the second-highest ranking Privy counsellor
- Deputy: Permanent secretary to the prime minister
- Salary: 1,458,000 DKK (€195,900) annually
- Website: Official website

The prime minister of Denmark (Danish: Danmarks statsminister, literally "state minister"; Faroese: Forsætisráðharri, literally "minister-president"; Greenlandic: Ministeriuneq, literally "head minister") is the head of government in the Kingdom of Denmark comprising the three constituent countries: Denmark, Greenland and the Faroe Islands. The kingdom did not initially have a head of government separate from its head of state, namely the monarch, in whom the executive authority was vested. The Constitution of 1849 established a constitutional monarchy by limiting the powers of the monarch and creating the office of premierminister. The inaugural holder of the office was Adam Wilhelm Moltke.

The prime minister presides over a cabinet that is formally appointed by the monarch. In practice, the appointment of the prime minister is determined by their support in the Folketing (the National Parliament). Since the beginning of the 20th century, no single party has held a majority in the Folketing so the prime minister must head a coalition of political parties, as well as their own party. Additionally, only four coalition governments since World War II have enjoyed a majority in the Folketing, so the coalitions (and the prime minister) must also gain loose support from other minor parties.

Mette Frederiksen has served as Prime Minister of Denmark since 27 June 2019. Since 3 June 2026, her cabinet has consisted of the Social Democrats (Danish: Socialdemokratiet), the Green Left (Danish: Socialistisk Folkeparti), the Danish Social Liberal Party (Danish: Radikale Venstre), and the Moderates (Danish: Moderaterne)

== History ==
=== Establishment ===
From approximately 1699 to 1730, the highest-ranking non-monarchial government official was titled "Grand Chancellor" (storkansler) and from 1730 until 1848, this office was titled "Minister of State" (Statsminister). These titles foreshadowed the modern office of prime minister, however, unlike the current office, the grand chancellor and state minister were not formal heads of government. The king held executive authority as absolute ruler from 1661 until the enactment of a liberal Constitution in the early nineteenth century.

The office of prime minister was introduced as a part of the constitutional monarchy outlined in 1848 and signed as the Danish Constitution on 5 June 1849. The new Constitution established a parliamentary system by creating a new bicameral parliament (Rigsdagen) and a Council Presidium, headed by a council president. The Council Presidium is regarded as the predecessor of the modern Prime Minister's Office. The first council president was Adam Wilhelm Moltke, who came to power on 22 March 1848. Moltke and his next two successors also held the title of premierminister, which translates as "prime minister".

From 1855 onwards the prime minister was known simply as the "council president" (Konseilspræsident). Carl Christian Hall became the first prime minister/council president to lead a political party (the National Liberal Party).

=== Modern office ===
The modern Prime Minister's Office was founded on 1 January 1914, when the Council Presidium was established as a department under the prime minister, when it had previously existed as an informal council gathered by the prime minister. The title of the prime minister changed again in 1918 under the premiership of Carl Theodor Zahle, becoming titled Statsminister or "Minister of State", in line with its Scandinavian neighbours, Norway and Sweden), which it remains to this day.

By the mid-nineteenth century a strong party-system had developed, with most prime ministers being the leader of either Venstre (left) or Højre (right). However, by 1924 the Social Democrats had become the largest party and Højre had disappeared.

During the first years of Occupation of Denmark, the governments of prime ministers Vilhelm Buhl and then Erik Scavenius cooperated with the Nazi occupiers. On 29 August 1943, the Danish government resigned, refusing to grant further concessions to Nazi Germany. All government operations were assumed by the permanent secretaries of the individual departments, and this arrangement lasted until the Liberation of Denmark on 5 May 1945. Since King Christian X never accepted the resignation of the government, it existed de jure until a new cabinet was formed on 5 May 1945.

The twentieth century was dominated by Social Democratic prime ministers leading left-wing coalitions; Social Democratic prime ministers were in power nearly continuously from 1924 until 1982. The first prime minister from the Conservative People's Party, Poul Schlüter, came to power as the head of a broad centre-right coalition in 1982. The centre-right coalition rule until 1993, lasting for eleven years, made it the longest centre-right government in Danish history since the 1920s.

In November 2001 the left-wing coalition in the Folketing lost seats to the right-wing coalition led by Venstre, ending their eight years rule. Venstre became the largest party since 1924. Anders Fogh Rasmussen, leader of Venstre, served as the prime minister from 2001 to April 2009. His coalition government consisted of Venstre and the Conservative People's Party, with parliamentary support from the national-conservative Danish People's Party (Dansk Folkeparti). On 5 April 2009, Rasmussen resigned to become Secretary General of NATO, leaving minister of finance and vice president of Venstre Lars Løkke Rasmussen to be the prime minister.

Following the September 2011 election the right-wing lost by a small margin to the opposing centre-left coalition, led by Helle Thorning-Schmidt who on 3 October 2011 formed a new government initially consisting of the Social Democrats, the Danish Social Liberal Party and the Socialist People's Party. Following a general election defeat, in June 2015 Thorning-Schmidt resigned as Prime Minister and was succeeded by Lars Løkke Rasmussen, who headed a minority government consisting entirely of ministers from Venstre.

The Social Democrats returned to power after the 2019 election, with Mette Frederiksen assuming the role of prime minister.

== Role and authority ==
The Constitution of Denmark states that the monarch, who is the head of state, has supreme authority and acts out this power through their ministers. However, the modern role of the Monarch is symbolic only. The monarch formally appoints and dismisses ministers, including the prime minister. However, any action of the monarch requires a countersignature from a minister. It is also a principle in Danish constitutional literature that "the power follows the responsibility" (magten følger ansvaret), and the monarch being free from responsibility means they have no genuine power. In the case of appointing ministers, it is the signature of the prime minister. This means that the power to appoint ministers practically lies entirely with the prime minister and not the monarch.

Although the country's leading politician, the prime minister is not nearly as powerful as other prime ministers in Europe. This is mainly because it is nearly impossible for one party to get a majority of seats in the Folketing (Parliament), so the government is always either a coalition or a one-party minority government. No Danish party has won a majority since 1901, and for much of that time there has not even been a majority coalition. Because of their limited powers, the prime minister is primus inter pares (first among equals). Additionally, unlike most of their counterparts, Danish prime ministers can never be certain that their agenda will pass, and must cobble together a majority for each piece of legislation.

Although, as stated, the monarch formally appoints all ministers of the cabinet freely according to the constitution, in practice monarchs only conventionally select the prime minister after a leader has gathered support from a majority in the Folketing. This has been the case since parliamentarianism became the convention after the Easter Crisis in 1920. Parliamentarianism was added to the constitution in 1953 with section 15. Today, it means that the monarch on the responsibility of the resigning prime minister cannot appoint a new prime minister which they expect will be met with a successful vote of no confidence. With no party having held a majority in over a century, parties form alliances. Usually, the Social Democrats join with centre-left parties, and Venstre with centre-right parties. Following elections when there is no clear leader, the monarch will hold a "king/queen's meeting" where, after a series of discussions and agreements, the leader of the largest alliance and the largest party within that alliance—usually the Social Democrats or Venstre- is appointed as prime minister-elect (kongelig undersøger, "royal investigator/examiner"). The new prime minister-elect, together with the leaders of the junior parties, select ministers to form a new coalition cabinet, which is the presented to the monarch. The government is allowed to take office without a vote of confidence, and is allowed to stay in office as long as it does not lose a vote of no confidence.

The prime minister chairs the weekly meetings of the cabinet meetings and has the power to set the agenda of these meetings. The prime minister traditionally gathers together a government ministry known as the "Ministry of the State of Denmark" (Statsministeriet) or Prime Minister's Office. Atypical of a Danish ministry it does not have any councils, boards or committees associated with it and its near sole responsibility is to act as the secretariat of the prime minister. There is a small department under the ministry that takes care of special legal issues not covered under other ministries, among others Greenland's and the Faroe Islands' relation to the monarchy, the mass media's contact to the state, the number of ministers in the government, or Queen Margrethe II's legal status as a civilian.

The prime minister has the power to choose to dissolve the Folketing and call a new election (although this is formally undertaken by the monarch), which the prime minister is obligated to do within four years of the previous election. In spite of this, the prime minister has no say with respect to Denmark's autonomous regions, the Faroe Islands and Greenland, while the Folketing on the other hand does, as all laws passed by the Faroese and Greenlandic parliaments must be ratified by the Folketing.

There are checks on the prime minister's power. If the Folketing revokes its confidence in an incumbent prime minister, the prime minister must either resign along with the entire cabinet or call a new election. Whenever a prime minister resigns, dies, or is forced from office, the monarch asks them (or, in the case of death, the next available leader in a coalition) to keep the government as a caretaker government until a successor has been elected.

== Amenities ==
The government offices, including the Ministry of the State of Denmark (Statsministeriet; The Prime Minister's Office), is located inside Christiansborg Palace, along with the Folketing and the courts.

The official summer residence of the prime minister is Marienborg, an eighteenth-century estate that was acquired by the state. It is situated on the shore of Lake Bagsværd in Kgs. Lyngby, 15 kilometres (9.3 mi) north of Copenhagen. It has served as an official summer residence for ten prime ministers since 1960. Marienborg is frequently used for governmental conferences and informal summits between the government, industry and organisations in Denmark.

== See also ==
- Borgen (TV series)
- Cabinet of Denmark
- List of Danish government ministries
- List of lawmen and prime ministers of the Faroe Islands
- Prime Minister of Greenland
