= Claus Hjort doctrine =

Danish political strategy

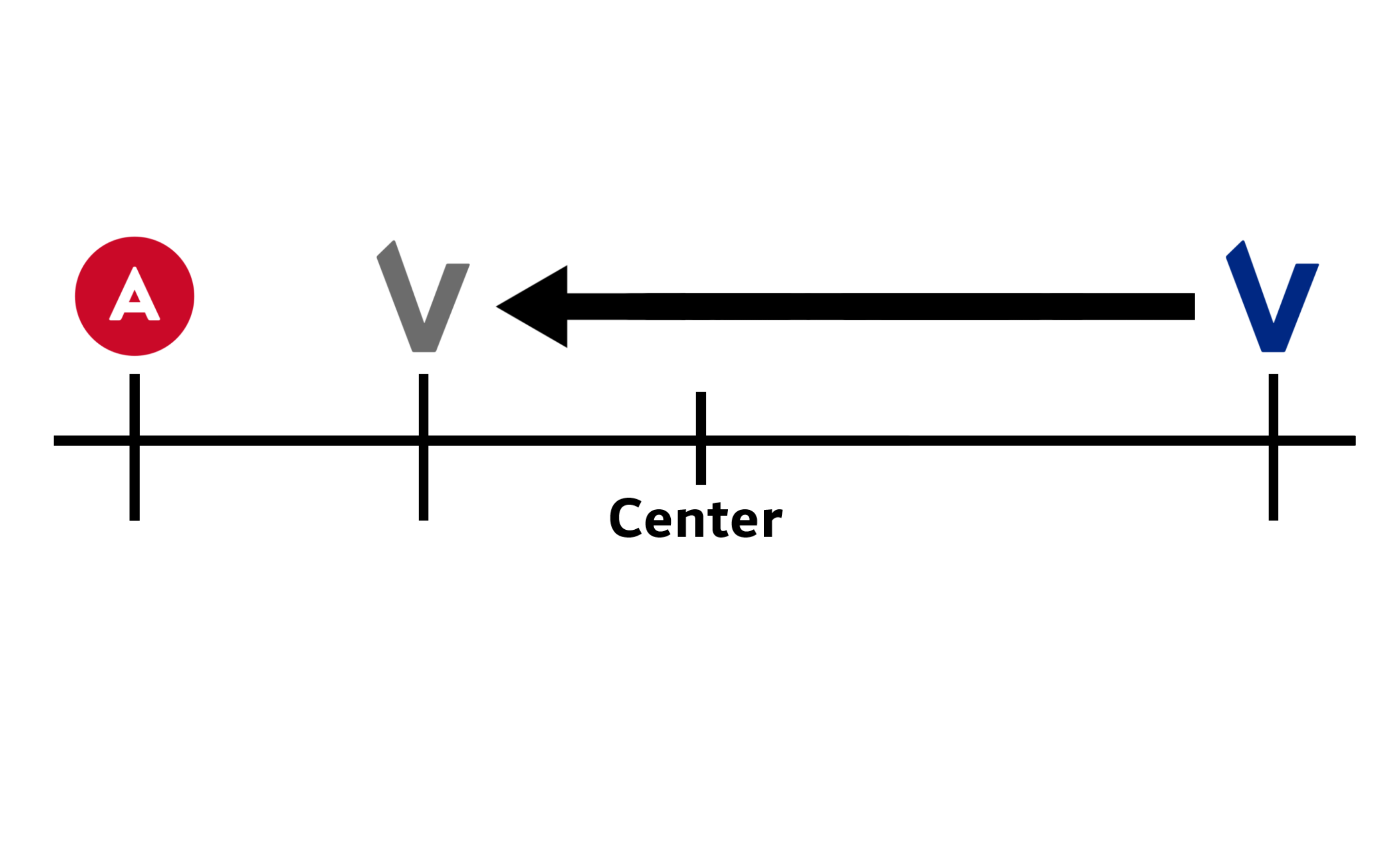
The Claus Hjort doctrine as illustrated on the political spectrum

The Claus Hjort doctrine (Danish: Claus Hjort-doktrinen) or Hjort doctrine (Hjort-doktrinen) is a political strategy for Danish right-wing parties of the blue bloc, which holds that such parties must embrace the welfare state and restrain tax cuts to succeed in parliamentary elections.

The doctrine was devised in 2001 and has primarily been applied to Venstre. It has contributed to four right-wing election victories from 2001 to 2015.

== Doctrine ==
According to the doctrine, the Danish center-right party Venstre should not talk about tax cuts leading up to an election, as it deters Danish voters. Instead, it should embrace the welfare state and advocate for a more restrained tax policy. Furthermore, Venstre should mimic whatever the Social Democrats want for the welfare state, but in a more liberal manner.

The liberal element holds that even though it is the Danish state that delivers social benefits, the citizens should have a say in what is being delivered. The idea of the doctrine was that Venstre should be a guarantor of welfare in the Danish voters' view as a response to the Social Democrats' saying that it is either "welfare or tax cuts". As such, in political communication, the voter should get the perception that Venstre is politically close to the Social Democrats and left of center. As a result, redistribution issues would lose their importance in the voters' conscience so that Venstre could instead focus on other issues, such as Immigration policies.

=== Kontraktpolitikken ===
The Kontraktpolitikken (transl. the contract policy) was another political strategy, which can be argued to be an element in the Claus Hjort doctrine. The strategy was used while Venstre held power and holds that Venstre's political communication should include the party's promise not to interfere with the welfare state. The strategy was developed to eliminate questions about the size of the welfare state under the VK government of 2001–2011, (Note: That is, the first, second, and third cabinet of Anders Fogh Rasmussen and the first cabinet of Lars Løkke Rasmussen) so voters, who had traditionally voted left-wing, could get the desired immigration policies.

In alignment with this strategy, a popular slogan of Venstre was Venstre ved du, hvor du har, which can be translated as "you know where Venstre stands". Additionally, in a speech to the Folketing in 2002, the Venstre Prime Minister of Denmark, Anders Fogh Rasmussen, mentioned his kept promises:

The two governing parties went into the election with a number of clear promises. We said what we wanted to do. And after the election, we did what we had said we would do before the election.

— Anders Fogh Rasmussen

==== Criticism ====
Kontraktpolitikken has since been criticized for making it harder to make necessary policy shifts between elections, while also making it impossible to take unpopular decisions.

== History ==
=== Before 2001 ===
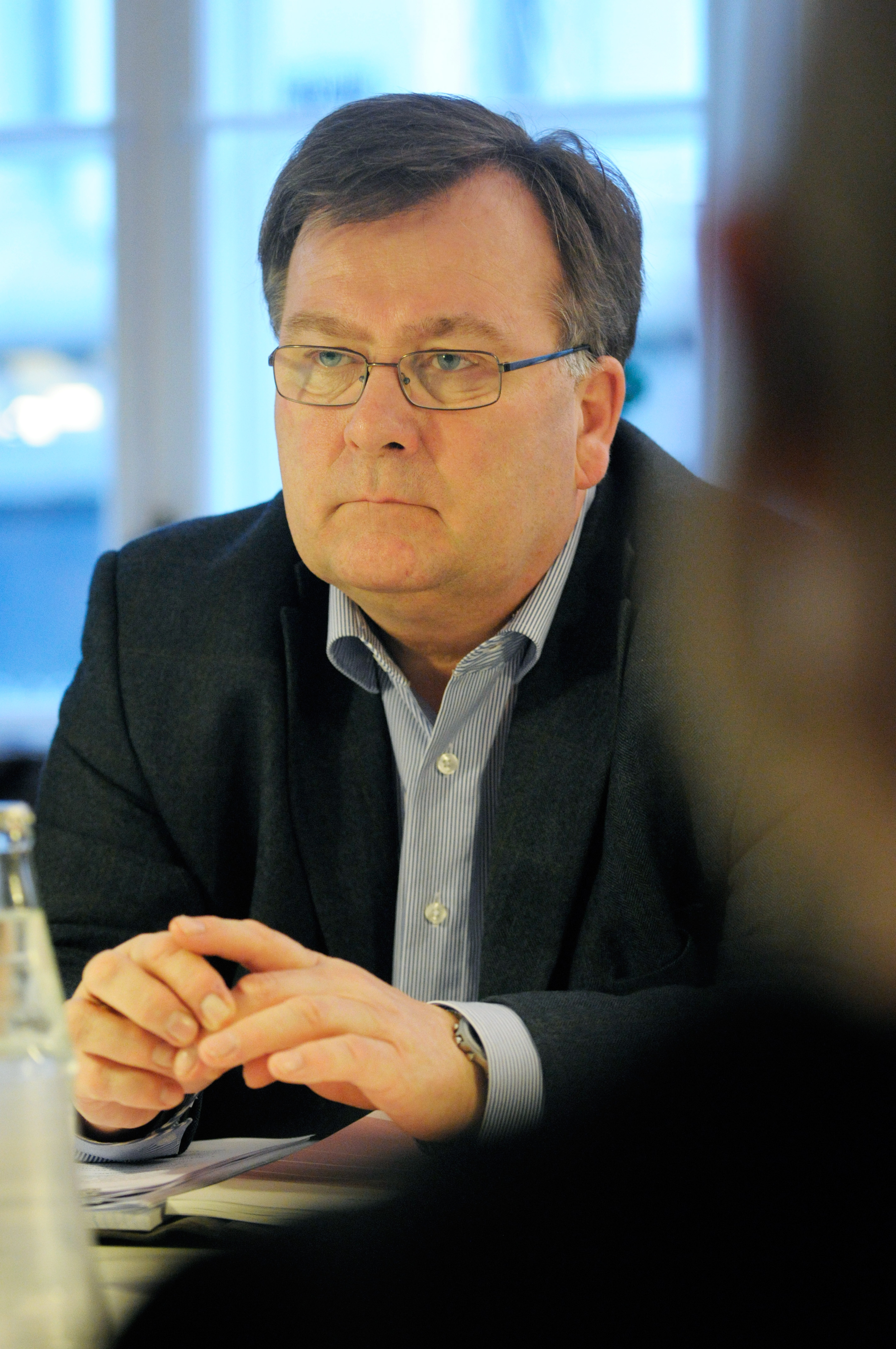
Claus Hjort Frederiksen as Minister for Employment in 2008

In the early 1990s, Anders Fogh Rasmussen wrote From Social State to Minimal State, wanting the Danish state to have less influence. Nevertheless, the 1990s became dominated by the Social Democrats, and a new political doctrine had to be used by Venstre. Based on the acknowledgement that Danish voters were content with the welfare state, (Note: This idea is supported by opinion polling, with 64% of Danes preferring an improvement of public services over tax cuts in 2001. Nonetheless, a majority also supported hard immigration and criminal policies.) Rasmussen decided to move towards the center with regard to economic policies, thereby abandoning the idea of a minimal state. As such, the Claus Hjort doctrine was devised in 2001, named after the former party secretary of Venstre, Claus Hjort Frederiksen. The doctrine has also been called the Fogh-Hjort doctrine.

=== 2001–2022 ===
In the subsequent election in the same year, Venstre received its best result ever with 31.25% of the votes. In the election campaign, Venstre only promised a tax stop (skattestop) instead of tax cuts. Venstre continued to hold power throughout the 2000s, which was secured by the use of the Claus Hjort doctrine. From 2001 to 2022, the doctrine contributed to four right-wing parliamentary victories. Nonetheless, in the so-called climate election of 2019 election, 57% of Danes saw climate change as the most important issue, while only 27% said the same about immigration, which was an important component of the doctrine.

=== 2022–present ===
During the 2022 election, Venstre strictly followed the doctrine, refusing to cut in public spending. However, the Conservatives went directly and intentionally against the doctrine, promising to remove the topskat (special tax for high-income people). Claus Hjort Frederiksen commented in response to this approach:

In my view, it is simply out of your mind to come up with such a proposal if you want to attract votes from across the political centre. It will scare voters away [...] the problem, however, is that it is not the right-wingers' key issues that voters want.

— Claus Hjort Frederiksen

Throughout the election campaign, Hjort Frederiksen criticized the Conservatives, calling their strategy a "loser strategy" and saying they did not contribute positively. The Conservatives went from polling 16.7% to an election result of 5.5%. Meanwhile, the left-wing red bloc ended up receiving a majority in parliament at that election; nevertheless Venstre joined government with the Social Democrats, with topskat cuts becoming a part of the regeringsgrundlag (government programme). This was against the Claus Hjort doctrine, and according to Danish journalist Jakob Elkjær, the doctrine should also be upheld while in power, as moderate and centrist voters will punish liberal right-wing economic policies.

== See also ==
- Anders Fogh Rasmussen I Cabinet – Danish government from 2001 to 2005
- Immigration policy of Mette Frederiksen
- Curvilinear disparity – Political science theory on the ideological extremity of political party members

== Notes and citations ==
=== References ===
- Kirkegaard, Mathias Schwartz (5 November 2023). "De politiske doktriner efter årtusindskiftet: Hjort-doktrinen, Sass-doktrinen og kontraktpolitikken" [The Political Doctrines After the Turn of the Millennium: The Hjort Doctrine, the Sass Doctrine, and Contract Politics]. KKG (in Danish). Karlslunde, Denmark.
- Elkjær, Jakob (3 May 2023). "Claus Hjort kaldte topskattelettelser hul i hovedet og fik ret" [Claus Hjort called top-tax cuts "crazy" and was proven right]. Altinget.dk (in Danish). Copenhagen, Denmark. ISSN 2597-0127.
- Ritzau (1 November 2022). "Claus Hjort giver røffel til Konservative: Sammenligner Pape med Liz Truss" [Claus Hjort Rebukes the Conservatives: Compares Pape to Liz Truss]. JydskeVestkysten (in Danish).
- Pedersen, John Storm; Aagaard, Peter (23 September 2015). Dirigent eller dukke? (in Danish) (1st ed.). Gyldendal. ISBN 9788702181609.
- Christensen, Matias Engdal; Jensen, Carsten (1 September 2025). "Danskernes holdning til velfærdsstaten". Politica. 57 (3): 54. doi:10.7146/politica.v57i3.158802. eISSN 2246-042X. ISSN 0105-0710 – via tidsskrift.dk.
- Arzrouni, Christopher [in Danish] (16 March 2011). "Fogh-Hjort-doktrinen". Dagbladet Børsen (in Danish).
