= Impeachment of Inger Støjberg =

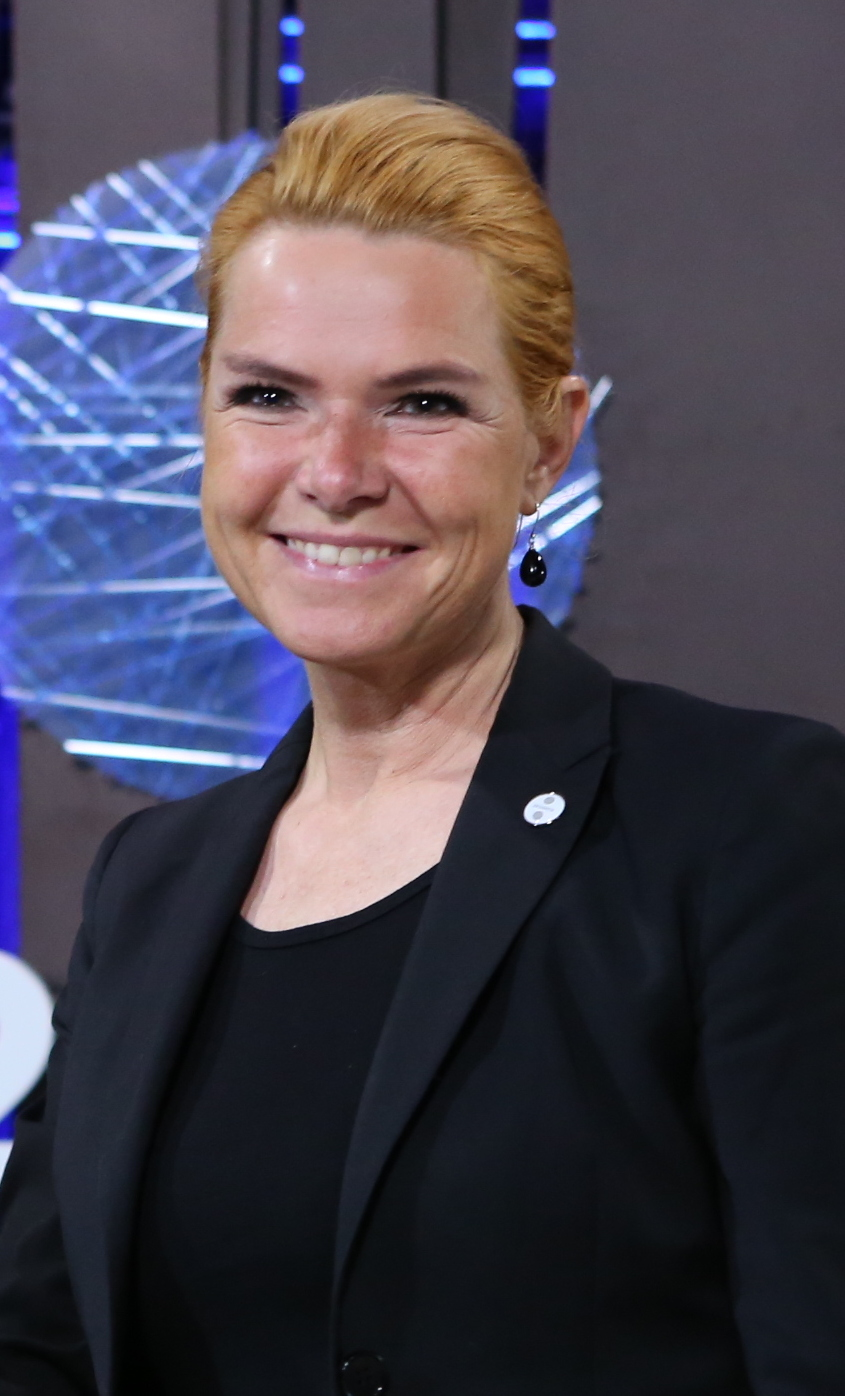
- Støjberg in 2017
- Accused: Inger Støjberg, Minister for Foreigners and Integration
- Date: 2 February – 13 December 2021
- Outcome: Støjberg removed from office and imprisioned for 60 days
- Charges: Instructing the Danish Immigration Service to separate asylum-seeking partners where one partner was under the age of 18

Vote by Folketing
- Votes in favor: 141 / 179 (79%)
- Votes against: 30 / 179 (17%)
- Not voting: 8 / 179 (4%)
- Result: Impeachment successful: Støjberg to be tried by Court of Impeachment

Decision by Court of Impeachment
- Votes in favor: 25 / 26 (96%)
- Votes against: 1 / 26 (4%)
- Result: Impeachment upheld: Støjberg removed from office but re-elected running for Denmark Democrats in 2022

Inger Støjberg, between 2015 and 2019 the Danish Minister for Immigration and Integration, was impeached by the Folketing on 2 February 2021 with 141 votes for and 30 against. Støjberg was accused of, in her capacity as Minister, having instructed the Danish Immigration Service to separate asylum-seeking partners where one partner was under the age of 18, which – according to the ombudsman of the Folketing, an examination by a commission, and an assessment by two impartial lawyers – was not allowed. It was deemed against the European Convention on Human Rights, and there will be an individual evaluation of each couple's separation.

The impeachment's 141 votes came from The Red–Green Alliance, The Socialist People's Party, The Social Democratic Party, The Social Liberal Party, Liberal Alliance, The Conservative People's Party and The Alternative, as well as a majority of members from Venstre. On the other side, The New Right, The Danish People's Party and nine members of Venstre, including former Prime Minister Lars Løkke Rasmussen, voted against it, the latter saying it could make her a political martyr.

Støjberg was tried before the Court of Impeachment, which consists of 30 members: 15 Supreme Court judges and 15 members chosen by the Folketing.

On 13 December 2021, Støjberg was convicted and sentenced to 60 days of unconditional imprisonment, when 25 out of 26 judges considered her guilty.
