= May's law =

May's law may refer to:

- May's law, the Special Law of Curvilinear Disparity, a political science theory named for John D. May
- May's theorem, a social choice theory of Kenneth May
- May's law, a computing adage similar to Wirth's law, formulated by David May
