= Court of Impeachment (Denmark) =

Danish special court

Court of Impeachment of the Realm
- Rigsretten
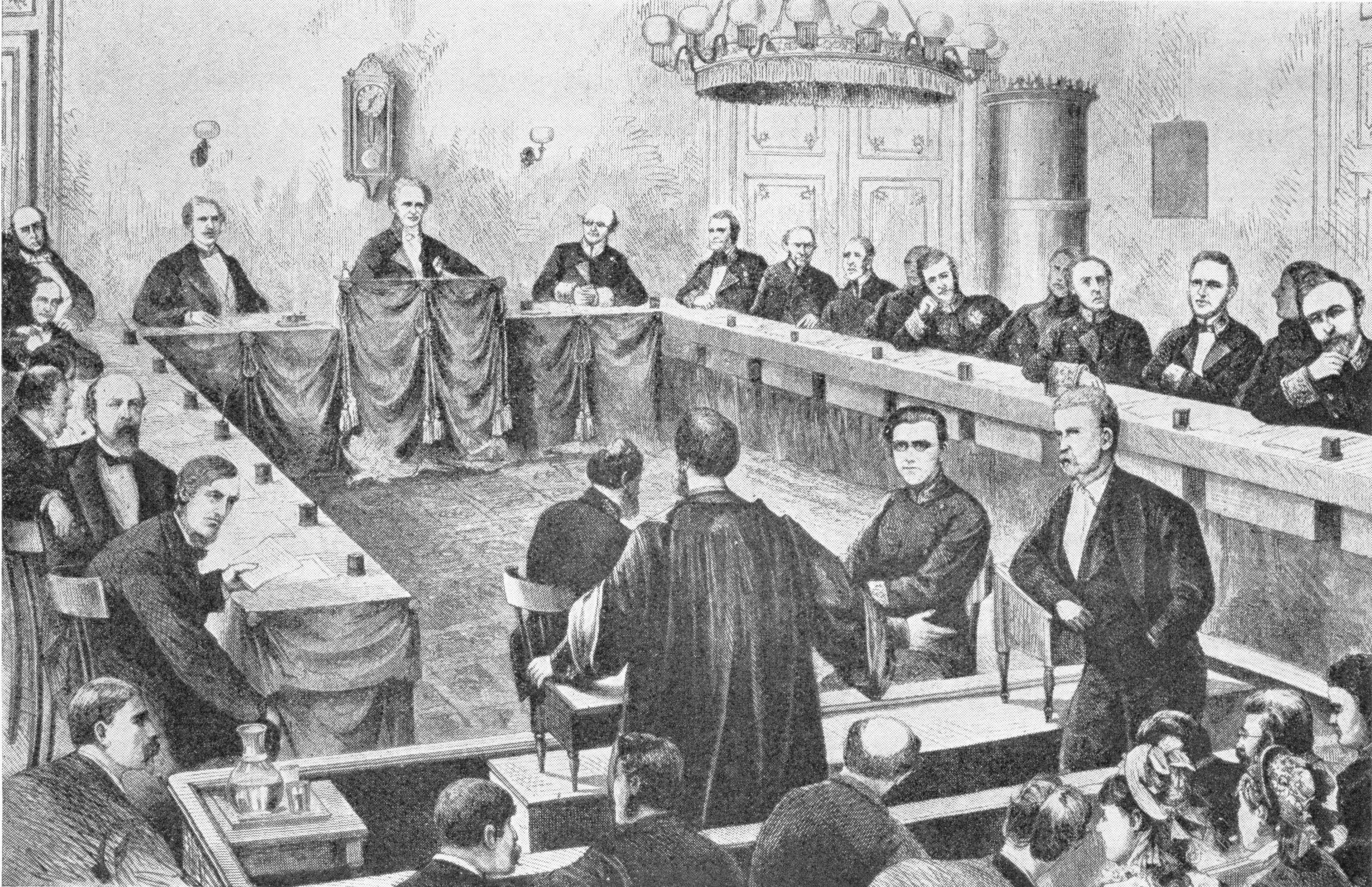
- The Court of Impeachment in session in the Landsting Chamber, Christiansborg Palace, 1877.
- Established: June 5, 1849; 177 years ago
- Jurisdiction: Kingdom of Denmark
- Composition method: Equal number of Supreme Court judges and parliamentary appointees.
- Authorised by: Danish Constitution
- Judge term length: Supreme Court Justices: mandatory retirement at age 70; Parliamentary appointees: 6 years
- Number of positions: Max. 30
- Type of tribunal: Impeachment tribunal
- Website: rigsretten.dk (Danish)

President of the Court of Impeachment
- Currently: None. (Thomas Rørdam was the most recent President)

The Court of Impeachment of the Realm (also called the High Court of the Realm or simply the Court of Impeachment) (Danish: Rigsretten) is a special court of the Kingdom of Denmark, that the Danish Parliament (Danish: Folketinget) can assemble, to hear and deliver judgments against ministers accused of unlawful misconduct and maladministration of office. According to the wording of the Constitutional Act, the Sovereign of Denmark can also demand that Ministers be impeached and brought before the Court of Impeachment. However, in practice only Government has this right.

The Court consists of up to 15 Supreme Court judges appointed on seniority, as well as 15 members appointed by the Folketing's parties from outside the Parliament. These members shall be appointed for a period of 6 years.

The Court of Impeachment was established by the Danish Constitution in 1849. The Court of Impeachment differs from the ordinary courts (see Courts of Denmark) in its particular composition and in that indictments, unlike in ordinary criminal proceedings, aren't arisen by the Danish Prosecution Service but by the Folketing or the Monarch. The Court of Impeachment can only hear cases relating to a minister's tenure – if charges are to be brought against a minister for other forms of crime, the indictment must be brought in the ordinary courts. While the Danish Constitution allows the Court of Impeachment to deal with such cases, it has never been used.

In the interests of confidence in the party-political independence and impartiality of the judges of the Court of Impeachment, it may be problematic that the non-judicial judges of the Court of Impeachment are chosen by party-political politicians of the Danish Parliament. Historical experience shows that politically appointed members of the Court of Impeachment have tended to judge according to the party-card. Several members of the Court of Impeachment are former members of parliament.

Since the Court of Impeachment was instituted in 1849, six cases have been brought before the Court, but only three Ministers have been found guilty. In 1910, the former Minister for the Interior Sigurd Berg, was ordered to pay a fine for negligence in his supervision of The Zealand Farmers’ Savings Bank (Danish: Den Sjællandske Bondestands Sparekasse) (the Alberti case). In 1995, the former Minister for Justice Erik Ninn-Hansen, was given a suspended sentence of four months imprisonment for having prevented Tamil refugees from bringing their families to Denmark (the Tamil Case). In 2022, the former Minister for Immigration and Integration Inger Støjberg, was sentenced to 60 days in prison for illegal separation of couples in refugee centres.

== Current members of the Court of Impeachment ==
The Court consists of up to 15 Supreme Court judges appointed on seniority, as well as 15 members (from outside the Parliament) appointed by the Folketing's parties. These members are appointed for a period of 6 years.

The 15 members chosen by the Folketing for the period of 2020–2026
#	Name	Political party
1	Erik Christensen	Social Democrats
2	Pia Gjellerup	Social Democrats
3	Karin Gaardsted	Social Democrats
4	Karen J. Klint	Social Democrats
5	Klaus Bach Trads	Danish Social Liberal Party
6	Anne Grete Holmsgaard	Socialist People's Party
7	Leif Donbæk Thomsen	Socialist People's Party
8	Ingelise Bech Hansen	Red–Green Alliance
9	Nicolai Mallet	Venstre
10	Karoly Németh	Venstre
11	Gert Eg	Venstre
12	Karen Rønde	Venstre
13	Mette Vestergaard Huss	Venstre
14	Christian Langballe	Danish People's Party
15	Keld Holm	Conservative People's Party

== Impeachment trials ==
Since the Court of Impeachment was instituted in 1849, six cases have been brought before the Court:

=== Impeachment trial of 1856 – Acquitted ===
Prime Minister Anders Sandøe Ørsted and his government were put before the Court of Impeachment for spending extra money on the military during the Crimean War, when the Baltic Sea became an important bastion. The accusation was that Rigsdagen had approved it. Ørsted and the government were acquitted.

=== First impeachment trial of 1877 – Acquitted ===
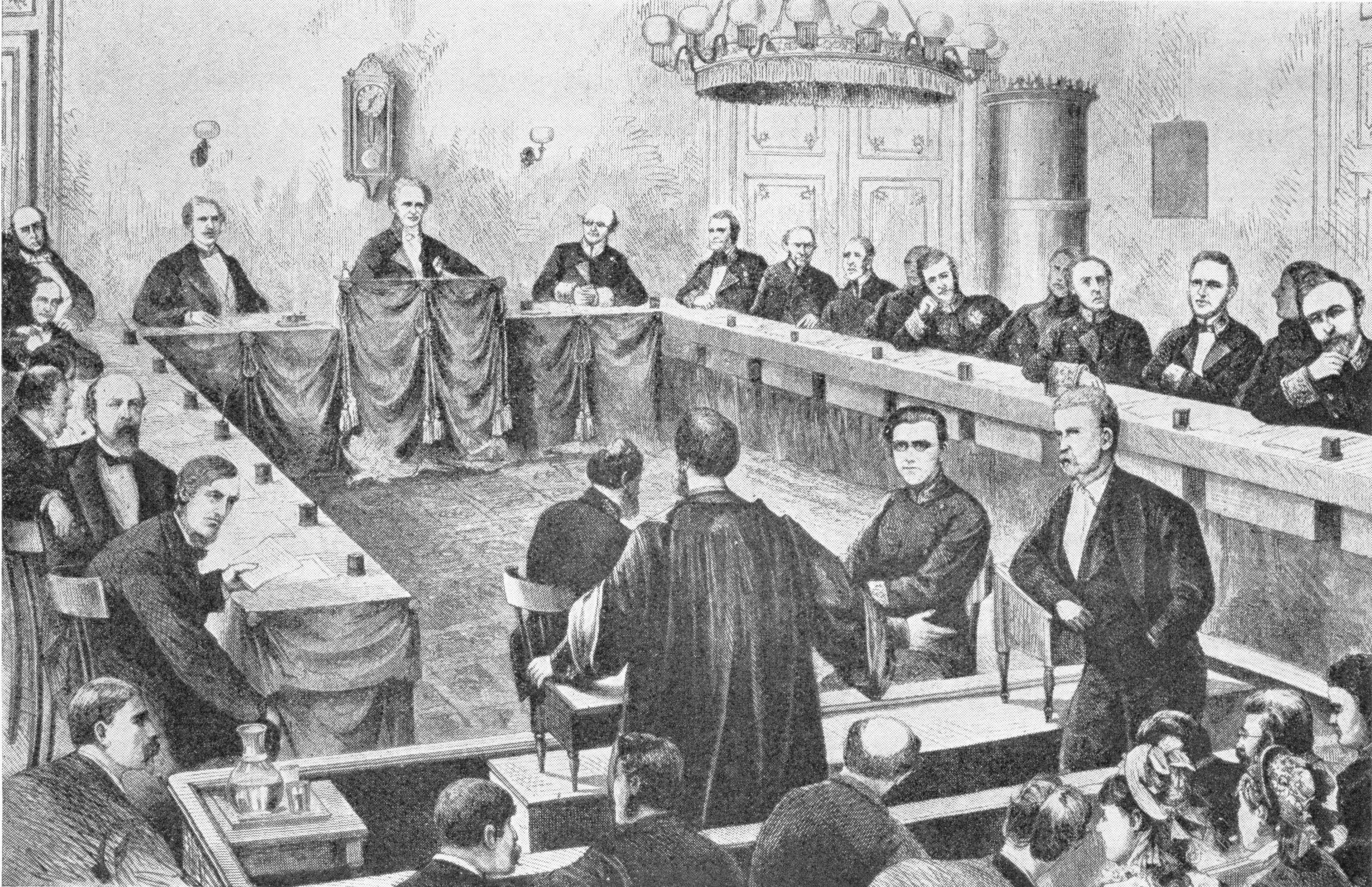
The Court of Impeachment in session in the Landsting Chamber, Christiansborg Palace, 1877.

The Minister for Finance Andreas Frederik Krieger was acquitted in the Court of Impeachment over the sale of the Frederik's Church area and grounds. The financier C.F. Tietgen had bought it too cheaply, the indictment said - and then the deal had been struck without Rigsdagen approving the sale.

=== Second impeachment trial of 1877 – Acquitted ===
Massive budget overruns in the construction of the Royal Danish Theatre were the reason why Prime Minister Carl Christian Hall and Minister for Culture Jens Jacob Asmussen Worsaae were put before the Court of Impeachment. The construction ended up being much more expensive than expected, but both Hall and Worsaae were acquitted in the Court of Impeachment.

=== Impeachment trial of 1910 – Convicted ===
The former Minister for Justice Peter Adler Alberti was convicted in an ordinary criminal trial for using the equivalent of 900 million Danish kroner of stolen money from the Den Sjællandske Bondestands Sparekasse (The Zealand Farmers’ Savings Bank). This led to the Prime Minister and the Minister of the Interior being accused of overhearing warnings about Alberti's fraud. Interior Minister Sigurd Berg was fined 1,000 Danish kroner. Prime Minister Jens Christian Christensen was acquitted.

=== Impeachment trial of 1995 – Convicted ===
In 1995, the former Minister for Justice Erik Ninn-Hansen, was given a suspended sentence of four months imprisonment for having prevented Tamil refugees from bringing their families to Denmark (the Tamil Case).

=== Impeachment trial of 2021 – Convicted ===
On 2 February 2021 the Folketing voted in a 141-30 (90 needed for majority) vote in favour of initiating an impeachment trial against former Minister for Immigration and Integration Inger Støjberg. On 13 December, Støjberg was convicted to 60 days of prison for unlawful misconduct and maladministration of office, pursuant to the Minister Accountability Act and the European Convention on Human Rights (Article 8), by illegally separating couples in refugee centres, where one or both persons were minors, some of them with children.
