= Inger Støjberg =

Danish politician (born 1973)

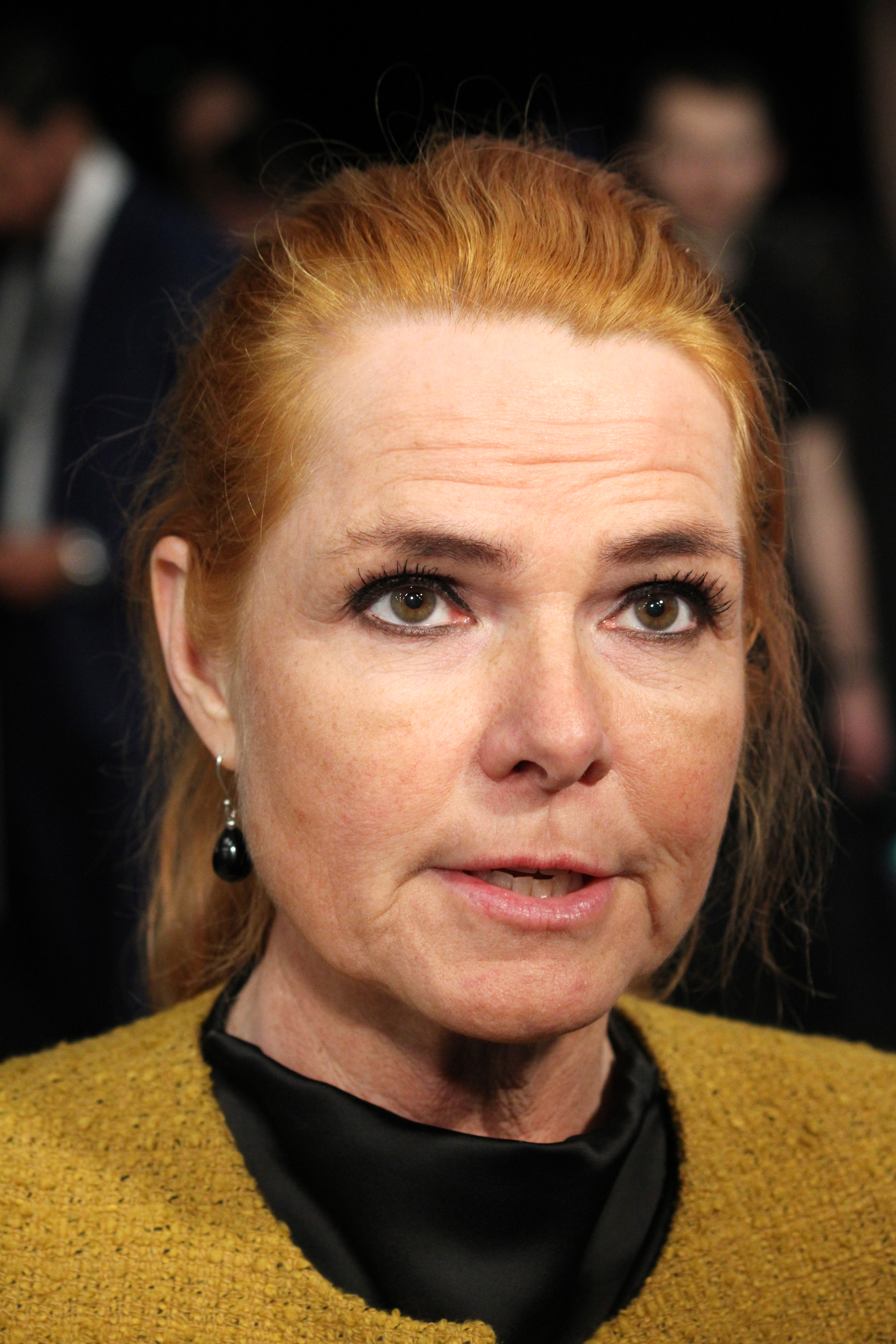
- Støjberg in 2026

Leader of Denmark Democrats
- Incumbent
- Assumed office 23 June 2022
- Preceded by: Position established

Minister for Immigration and Integration
- In office 28 June 2015 – 27 June 2019
- Prime Minister: Lars Løkke Rasmussen
- Preceded by: Manu Sareen
- Succeeded by: Mattias Tesfaye

Deputy Leader of Venstre
- In office 21 September 2019 – 29 December 2020
- Leader: Jakob Ellemann-Jensen
- Preceded by: Kristian Jensen
- Succeeded by: Stephanie Lose

Minister for Employment
- In office 7 April 2009 – 3 October 2011
- Prime Minister: Lars Løkke Rasmussen
- Preceded by: Claus Hjort Frederiksen
- Succeeded by: Mette Frederiksen

Minister for Gender Equality
- In office 7 April 2009 – 23 February 2010
- Prime Minister: Lars Løkke Rasmussen
- Preceded by: Eva Kjer Hansen
- Succeeded by: Lykke Friis

Member of the Folketing
- Incumbent
- Assumed office 2 November 2022
- In office 20 November 2001 – 21 December 2021
- Constituency: West Jutland (2007–2021); Viborg (2001–2007)

Personal details
- Born: Inger Beinov Støjberg; 16 March 1973 (age 53) Hjerk, Salling, Denmark
- Party: Denmark Democrats (since 2022)
- Other political affiliations: Venstre (1994–2021)
- Spouse: Jesper Beinov (m. 2006; div. 2012)
- Education: Aalborg University

Inger Beinov Støjberg (Danish: [ˈe̝ŋɐ ˈstʌjˌpɛɐ̯ˀ]; born 16 March 1973) is a Danish politician, businesswoman, and former reporter who served as a government minister in the Danish Parliament. Støjberg served as the minister for gender equality from 2009 to 2010, as minister for employment between 2010 and 2011, and as minister for immigration, integration and housing between June 2015 and June 2019.

A member of the Danish Parliament from the 2001 elections to 2021, she was a member of the liberal Venstre party until 4 February 2021, but left after a majority of the party's MPs voted to impeach her for an order she gave while serving as minister for immigration. On 13 December that year, she was convicted of separating asylum seeker families in which at least one spouse was under 18, and sentenced to 60 days in prison. On 21 December, a majority in the Folketing voted that the sentence means that she is no longer worthy of sitting in the Folketing and she therefore immediately lost her seat.

In June 2022, Støjberg founded Denmark Democrats – Inger Støjberg.

== Early life and professional career ==
Støjberg grew up as the daughter of a housewife and a farmer near the village of Hjerk in Salling. In 1993, she graduated from Morsø Gymnasium school in Nykøbing Mors. In 1995, she finished a one-year higher commerce exam at the Viborg School of Business in Viborg and a year later at the same school, she began a one-year study course in economic communication. In 1999, she graduated with a degree in communications management from the (now defunct) InformationsAkademiet and joined Viborg Bladet newspaper as a trainee reporter before becoming an editor for the paper in 2001. She later left the role and founded her own communications consultancy business Støjberg Kommunikation.

In 2013, Støjberg received a Master of Business Administration degree from the University of Aalborg.

== Political career ==
Støjberg was first elected to office as a member of the city council of Viborg Municipality, a position she occupied from 1994 to 2002. Additionally, she served as chairman of Liberalt Oplysnings Forbund (LOF) from 1996 to 1999. In 1999, she first ran for the parliament. With the electoral victory of her party in 2001, then headed by Anders Fogh Rasmussen, she entered parliament.

Since 2005, Støjberg has been a member of the Venstre party management. From 2005 to 2007, she was deputy faction chairwoman in the Folketing. From 2007 to 2022, she represented the electoral district of Western Jutland. From 2007 to 2009, Støjberg was a spokesperson for Venstre.

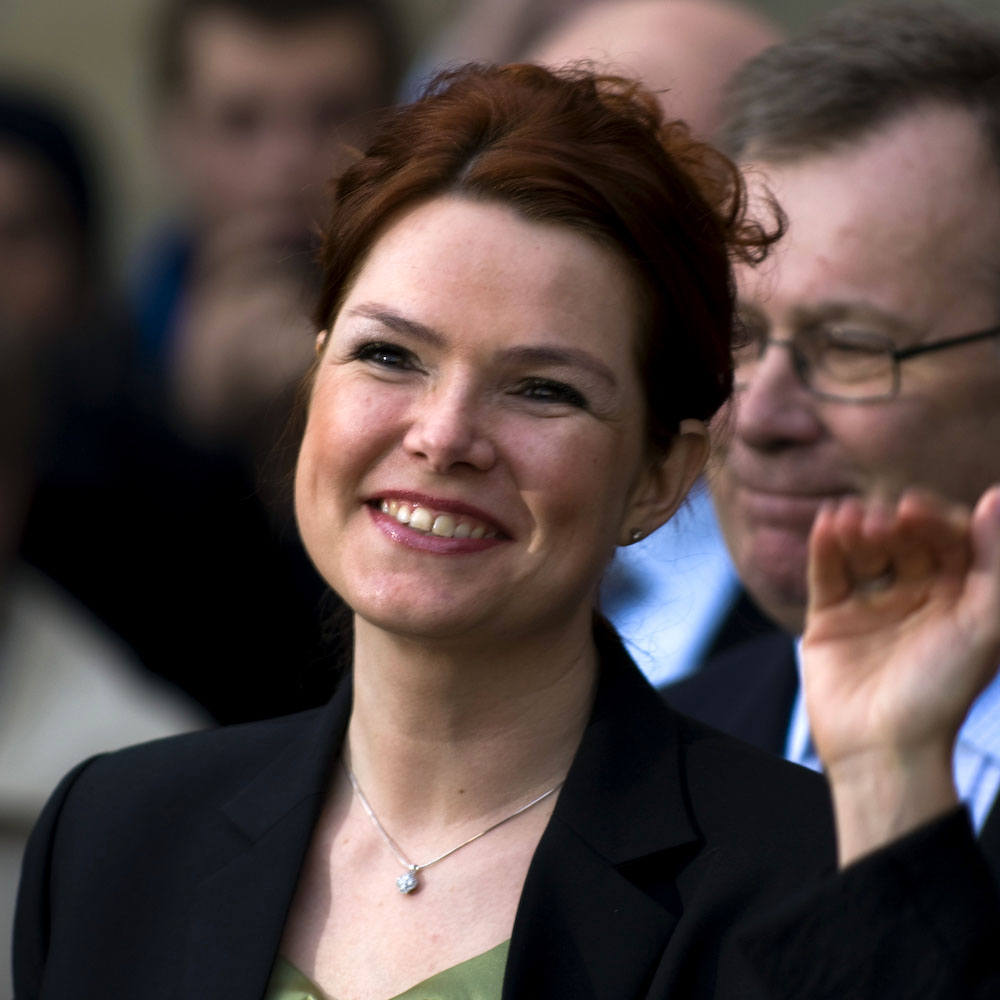
Inger Støjberg as the newly introduced Minister for Employment and Equal Rights in 2009

After the head of government Anders Fogh Rasmussen transferred to a new role in NATO, Støjberg became, in April 2009, minister of employment and minister of gender equality, succeeding Claus Hjort Frederiksen in the post. In 2010, the ministries were restructured and Støjberg was, until the electoral defeat of the conservative camp in 2011, only minister of employment. In the opposition, Støjberg became one of the leading public voices of her party and occupied from 2014 to the electoral victory in 2015 the post of spokesperson for Venstre. She also served as the minister for immigration and integration between June 2015 and 2019, where she was noted for her many tightenings of the Danish refugee policy, most notably the "paradigm shift", under which the goal of the Danish refugee policy shifted from the integration of refugees to an emphasis on repatriation.

In December 2020, Støjberg resigned as vice chair of Venstre following a request by Jakob Ellemann-Jensen, the chair. Venstre had previously supported impeaching Støjberg, following the 2016 instruction from her ministry to separate couples in refugee centres. After Støjberg had said that she did not support an impeachment process against herself, Ellemann-Jensen had asked her to resign. He furthermore claimed she had previously been disloyal to the party line.

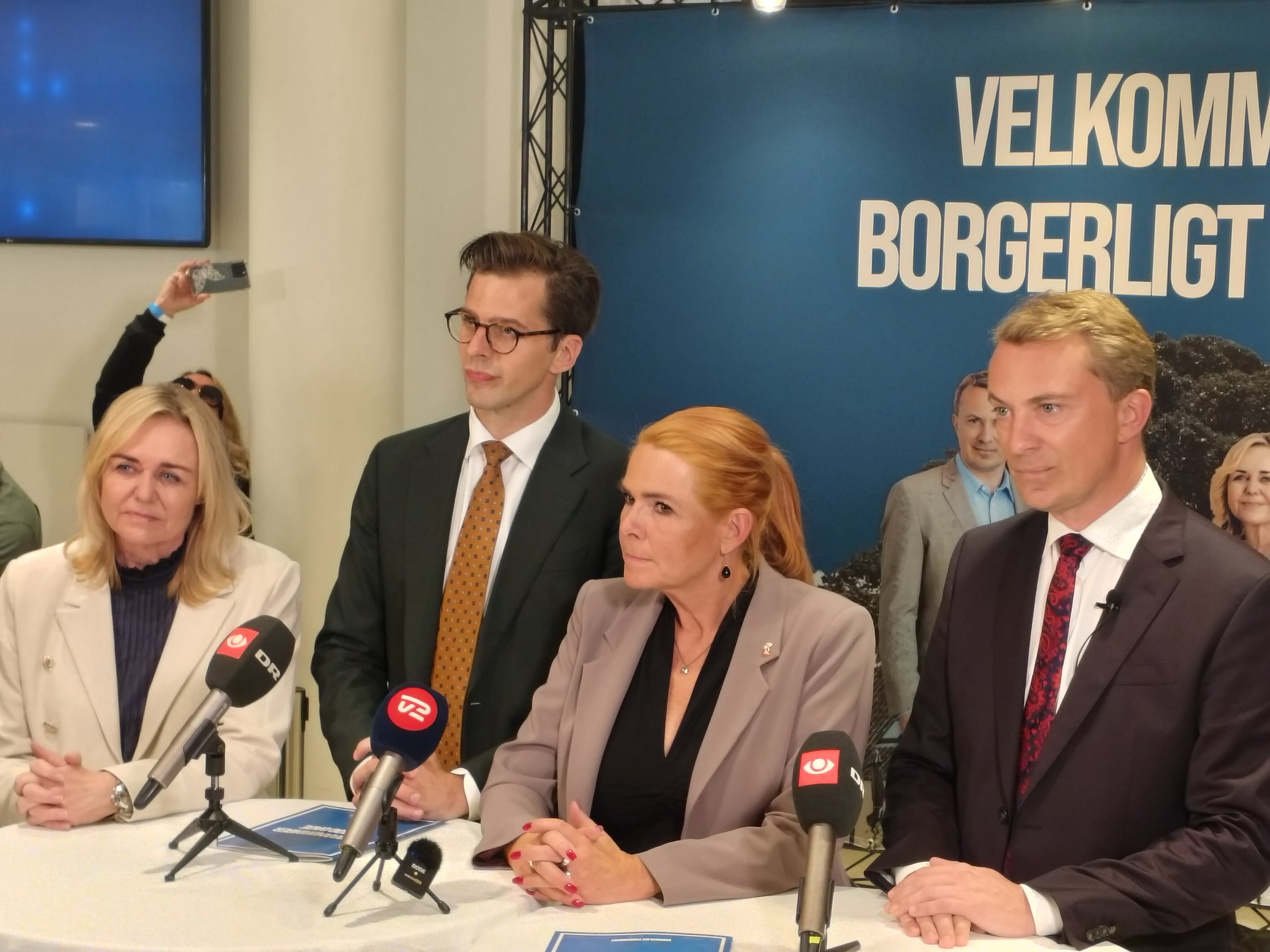
Støjberg with Alex Vanopslagh, Mona Juul and Morten Messerschmidt in Fredericia, 6 September 2025

In February 2021, Støjberg left Venstre. Subsequently, in June 2022, she founded the party Denmark Democrats, which got 8,1% of the vote in the 2022 Danish general election, where Støjberg herself got 47,211 personal votes.

== Policymaking ==
=== Asylum laws ===
Støjberg led a tightening of Danish asylum law which came into force 1 September 2015, and which, among other things, limited the provision of social services for asylum seekers. According to Støjberg, it should be unattractive for asylum seekers to travel into Denmark. Støjberg created controversy by starting an advertising campaign warning against applying for asylum in Denmark. Ads were posted in Lebanese newspapers, with plans on posting them in asylum seekers' homes in ten different languages and distributing them via social media.

Moreover, particularly in the Anglophone sphere, the "Jewelry law", which was introduced under Støjberg, and which decreed that asylum seekers already at the border give up a part of their valuables as a pledge for later service costs was critically reported on, in connection to which comparisons to Nazism were also made by commentators. In March 2017, Støjberg again attracted international media attention when she celebrated the 50th tightening of immigration law during her tenure as Minister for Immigration with a cake that she photographed and published on Facebook. Støjberg was directly involved in a controversial application of the Aliens Act being used to criminalize non-Danish professors who spoke or wrote publicly, being interpreted as a violation of their work visas.

In May 2018, Støjberg published a post through the Danish tabloid BT, saying that Muslims fasting during Ramadan should take leave from work "to avoid negative consequences for the rest of Danish society." Støjberg cited bus drivers as an example of workers whose performance could be negatively affected by abstaining from food and drink. Her comments provoked a backlash from other Danish politicians. A spokeswoman for the Danish government issued a statement which claimed that Støjberg comments were her own and did not represent the views of the country's government. Bus companies also distanced themselves from Støjberg's comments. Arriva, which runs a number of bus routes in Denmark, reported that it had never had any accidents involving drivers who were fasting.

=== Decree to separate young asylum couples at refugee centres ===
Støjberg has repeatedly been questioned regarding a decree from 2016, when she separated couples in refugee centres, where one or both persons were minors, some of them with children. The decree was illegal, and violated the Convention on the Rights of the Child, and Støjberg lied about it in Folketinget, the Danish parliament. Afterwards, she failed to report relevant details to the Parliamentary Ombudsman. A parliamentary committee probe was launched in January 2020. The committee investigated whether Støjberg violated the Convention on the Rights of the Child or the European Convention on Human Rights, both of which Denmark is subject to.

==== Impeachment trial of 2021 ====
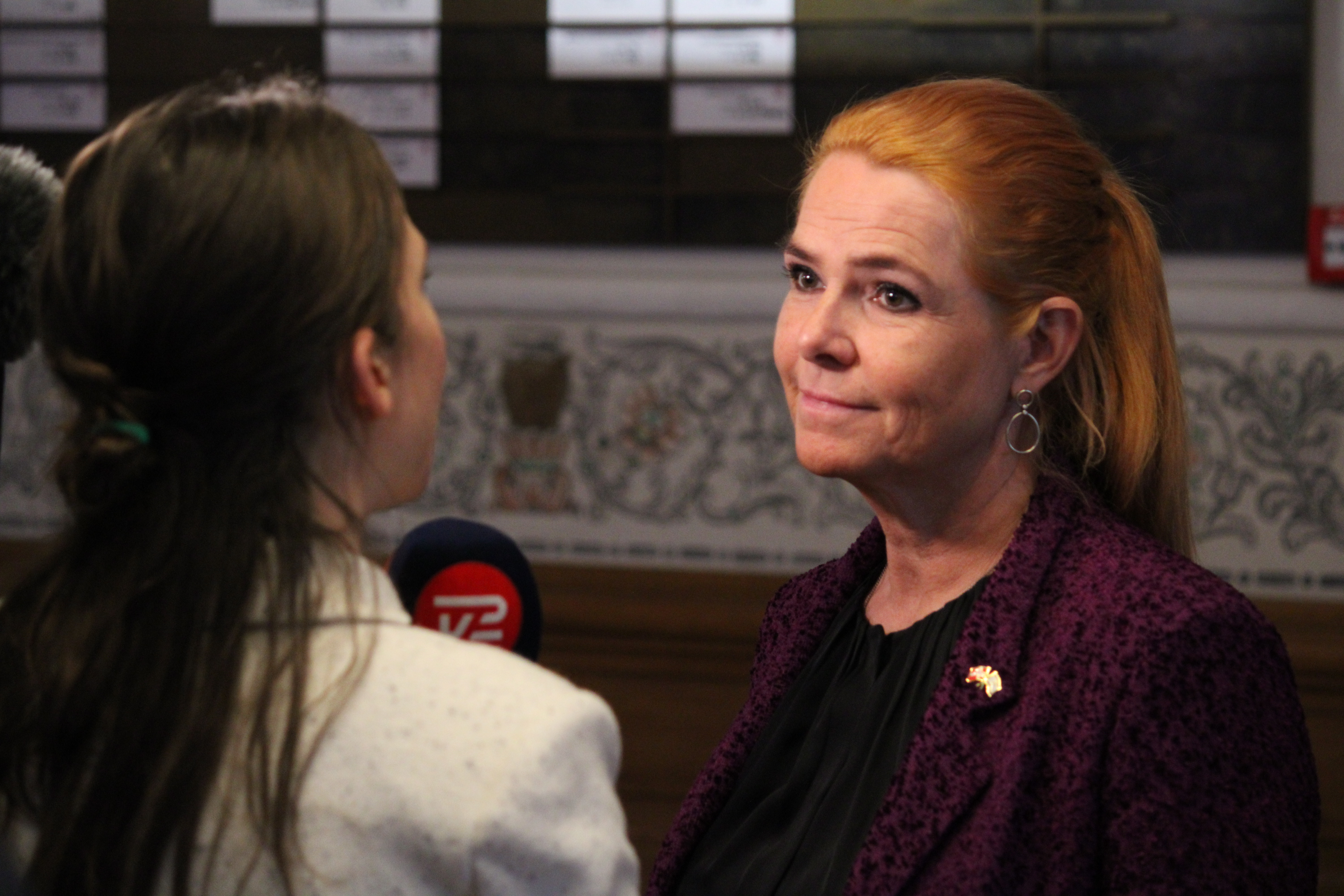
Støjberg at Christiansborg in October 2025

On 2 February 2021 the Folketing voted in a 141-30 (90 needed for majority) vote in favour of initiating an impeachment trial in the Danish Court of Impeachment against Støjberg. Støjberg is formally accused of unlawful misconduct and maladministration of office, pursuant to the Minister Accountability Act and the European Convention on Human Rights (Article 8), by illegally separating couples in refugee centres, where one or both persons were minors, some of them with children.

Støjberg was convicted on 13 December 2021 and sentenced to 60 days in prison. As a result, she lost her seat in the Folketing and was replaced by Gitte Willumsen.

== Other work and philanthropy ==
In 2004, Støjberg published an official biography of the North Jutlandic pop duo Sussi og Leo. Støjberg was also an organizer of the charity fundraiser "We remember Darfur" in which more than 300,000 Danish krone was collected for the benefit of women and children in Darfur. The money was handed over on 19 April 2007 to the Norwegian Church's Aid at a fundraising concert in Børsen.

== Personal life ==
In 2006, she married the long-time editor of Berlingske Jesper Beinov, who since 2016 is employed as a consultant of the Danish Ministry of Finance. Having no children, the couple divorced in 2012.

She lives in Hadsund in Mariagerfjord Municipality.

== Bibliography ==
- Støjberg, Inger (2004). Toner i livet (in Danish). ISBN 978-87-89109-75-6. Wikidata Q20968038.
- Støjberg, Inger (8 October 2018). "Islamisk levevis er problemet". B.T. (in Danish). Wikidata Q61939987. (translated title: The Islamic Way of Life is the Problem)
- Støjberg, Inger (26 March 2018). "Inger Støjberg forarget over somalisk kvinde: Vi belønner dovenskab". B.T. (in Danish). Wikidata Q61943788.

Political offices
Preceded by Claus Hjort Frederiksen	Minister for Employment; 2009–2011	Succeeded by Mette Frederiksen
Preceded by Karen Jespersen	Minister for Gender Equality of Denmark; 2009–2010	Succeeded by Lykke Friis
Preceded by Manu Sareen	Minister for Immigration and Integration; 2015–2019	Succeeded by Mattias Tesfaye
