= Bjarne Corydon =

Danish politician (born 1973)

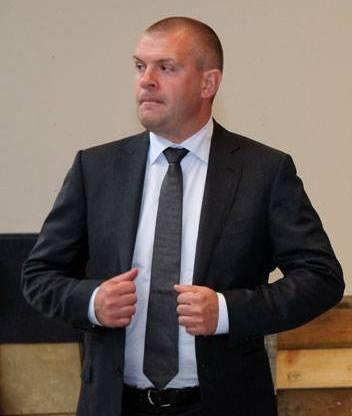

Minister of Finance
- In office 3 October 2011 – 28 June 2015
- Prime Minister: Helle Thorning-Schmidt
- Preceded by: Claus Hjort Frederiksen
- Succeeded by: Claus Hjort Frederiksen

Member of the Folketing
- In office 15 September 2011 – 12 January 2016
- Constituency: South Jutland

Personal details
- Born: Bjarne Fog Corydon; 1 March 1973 (age 53) Kolding, Denmark
- Party: Social Democrats
- Education: Aarhus University

Bjarne Fog Corydon (born 1 March 1973) is a Danish politician and businessman, who was a member of the Folketing from the Social Democrats from 2011 to 2016. He served as Finance Minister of Denmark in the Cabinet of Helle Thorning-Schmidt from 2011 to 2015, and was formerly her secretary. He serves since 2025 as Director General for DR.

== Early life ==
Corydon was born on 1 March 1973 in Kolding. He was born in a detached house just outside of Skovparken, which is now classified as a ghetto. He is the son of landscape gardener Arne Corydon and secretary Tove Corydon. During the weekends he worked a part-time job alongside his father to help his family's income by laying tiles. He also had to help his mom, who was often mentally unwell.

During his youth while attending the local gymnasium, he enjoyed reading books about politics and Fyodor Dostoevsky and playing football. After graduating from the gymnasium he attended Aarhus University from 1992 to 2000, graduating as a Candidate of Political Science.

== Career ==
In 2011 he was elected to the Folketing, and was appointed Minister of Finance by Helle Thorning-Schmidt. He was behind the controversial sale of the Danish company DONG to the American Goldman Sachs in 2014, which led the Socialist People's Party to leave the government coalition.

After he left the Folketing in 2016, Corydon worked for the management consulting company McKinsey & Co, and he was in 2018 appointed new CEO and Editor-in-Chief of Dagbladet Børsen, a Danish newspaper specialising in business news published in Denmark.

== Personal life ==
He is married to Nina Eg Hansen, who in 2012 became Director of the Ministry of Social Affairs, where she had worked for 10 years. Together, they have four children.

Political offices
Preceded by Claus Hjort Frederiksen	Minister of Finance; 2011–2015	Succeeded by Claus Hjort Frederiksen
