= Impeachment of Václav Klaus =

The impeachment of Václav Klaus refers to a failed attempt by members of the Czech Senate to impeach the President of the Czech Republic, Václav Klaus. The case was eventually dismissed by the court on the grounds that his mandate had already expired.

== Impeachment process ==
The President of the Czech Republic can only be impeached in the case of an act of treason (which is not defined in the constitution itself). The process must be initiated in the Senate, which has the exclusive power to impeach the president, and then passes to the Constitutional Court, which determines whether the President is guilty or not. If the president is found guilty then they are stripped of their office and may not be elected president again.

== Background ==
Václav Klaus was elected in 2003 and won his second term in 2008. His term ended in March 2013 as he was ineligible to run for another term. Before his term ended, he announced an amnesty to mark the 20th anniversary of the Czech Republic's independence. The amnesty took effect on 2 January and released all prisoners sentenced to one year or less whose sentences had not been served, and all prisoners over 75 years of age sentenced to ten years or less whose sentences had not been served, as well as cancelling all court proceedings which had been ongoing for longer than eight years. The amnesty was widely criticised by the public.

The amnesty sparked a public petition to persuade the Czech Senate to charge President Klaus with treason before the Constitutional court, effectively impeaching him. Within 24 hours of its launch, it had collected 24,500 signatures, and by the beginning of February 2013, the petition had been signed by more than 64,000 people.

== Impeachment ==
The process started on 4 March 2013, three days before Klaus' term expired. 38 Senators voted in favour, and 30 voted against. The court rejected the motion as Klaus' term had already expired and he thus could not be charged with treason.

== Reactions ==
Constitutional experts were uncertain whether the former president could be impeached. Some experts suggested that the motion had little chance of success as Klaus' actions were unlikely to be considered treason. However, Jan Kudrna expressed the view that the motion had some chance. Severe conducted a survey of Czech lawyers as to whether Klaus was guilty; 75% responded that he was not guilty while 16.7% responded that he was.

Klaus' successor Miloš Zeman, who had not agreed with the amnesty, described the impeachment attempt as a "hysterical reaction" and "absurd". He noted that treason is not clearly defined by the Constitution but amnesty is a constitutional power given to the President by the Constitution. Miroslav Kalousek, known as a vehement opponent of Klaus' politics, condemned the impeachment attempt as "gigantic stupidity".
