= Curvilinear disparity =

Political science theory on the ideological extremity of political party members

In political science, the special law of curvilinear disparity or May's Law is a theory conceived in 1973 by political scientist John D. May in his publication Opinion Structure of Political Parties. The theory posits that the rank and file members of a political party tend to be more ideologically extreme than both the leadership of that party and its voters. May contends that politically active people can be classified into three major strata or echelons according to their relative status within a party; party elite, middle-elite, and non-elite. Members of each divergent strata have contrasting motivations for being politically active and calibrate their ideological stances to differing extents as a result.

== Party strata ==
The three strata are: The Party Elite, The Middle-Elite (or Sub-Leaders) and the Non-Elite. Curvilinear disparity refers to the disparity in radicalism between the middle-elite and both the party elite and the non-elite.

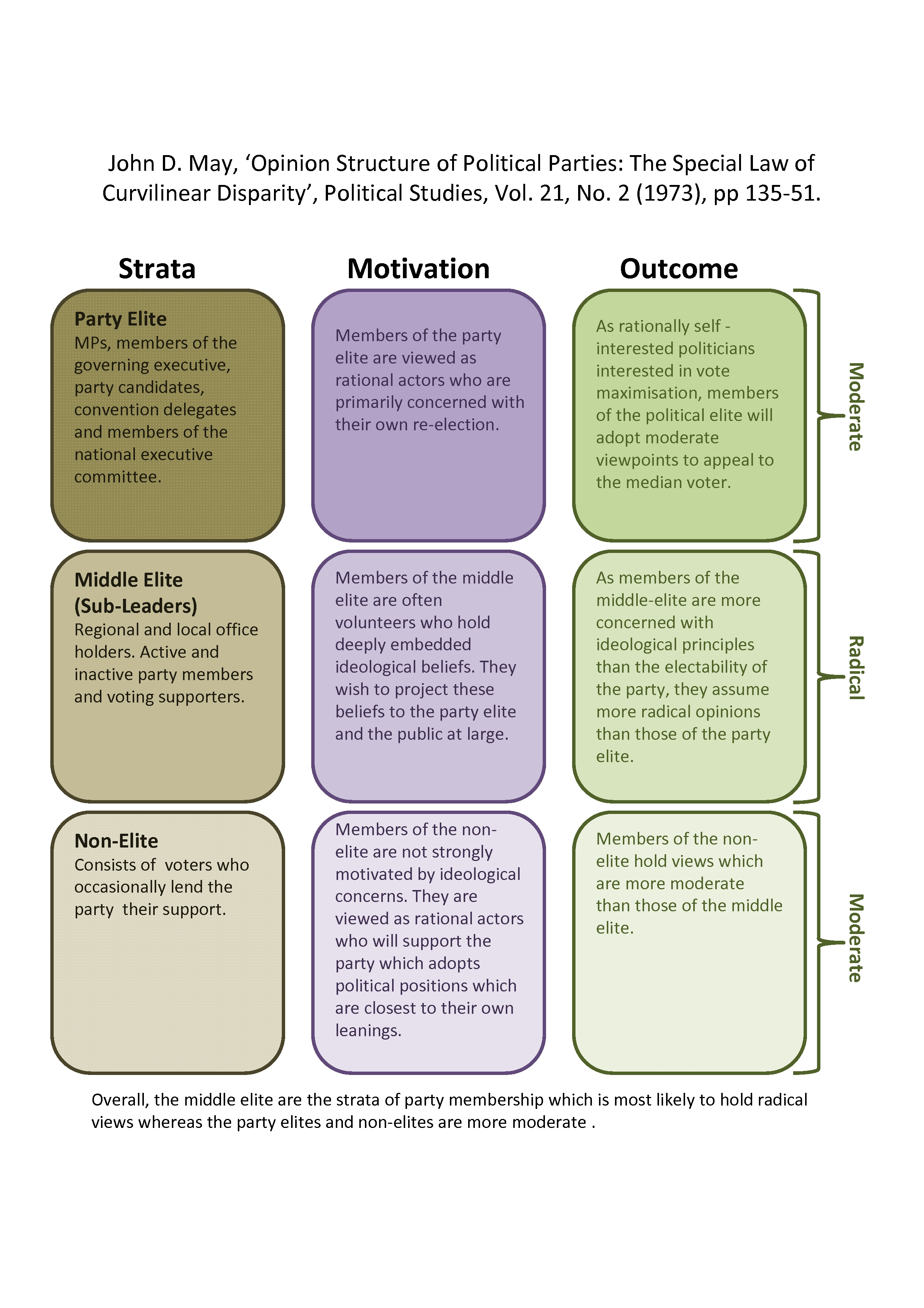
Curvilinear Disparity Diagram

Curvilinear Disparity in a two-party system

=== Party elite ===
The party elite consists of members of parliament, members of the governing executive, party candidates, convention delegates and members of the national executive committee. This stratum usually consists of full-time professional politicians who depend on elections to safeguard or further their careers. As a consequence, they have strong incentives to prioritise electoral success over personal ideological convictions. Members of the party elite are viewed as being rational actors whose primary motivation stems from their desire to be re-elected. As rationally self-interested politicians interested in vote maximisation, members of the political elite adopt moderate viewpoints in order to appeal to the median voter. These assumptions are in line with other established theories in political science, including the median voter theorem.

The concept of "the median voter" is usually applied to political systems featuring First-past-the-post electoral systems. In these systems, the highest polling candidate is elected to represent each single-member electoral district. This system differs from proportional representation, which features more elaborate voting procedures and multi-member electoral districts. As there can be only one winning candidate in each electoral district in First-past-the-post elections, there is an incentive for voters to support viable candidates and not "waste" their vote on hopefuls who have little chance of success. As a result, it is much harder for smaller parties to gain representation in parliament. Ultimately, there is a tendency for two-party systems to develop, as voters coalesce around potential winning candidates. This tendency is known as Duverger's law. In this kind of political landscape, in which there are two viable political parties, party elites tend to favour "big tent" electoral strategies that appeal to a broad range of the electorate rather than aiming for an ideological niche. While curvilinear disparity is typically associated with the Anglo-American political experience, however, it can theoretically occur in any large party.

The party middle-elite consists of loyal party voters, party members, and regional or local office holders. Unlike the party elite, this stratum usually consists of volunteers and part-time members who are not as directly affected by the electoral success of the party. Since they willingly volunteer their free-time to political activism and campaigning, the middle-elite often tend to hold more deeply embedded ideological beliefs than both the party elite and non-elite (or floating voters). The middle-elite tend to be strongly emotionally and psychologically invested in politics and seek to project their ideological convictions to the party elite and the public at large.

=== Non-elite ===
The non-elite consists of ordinary voters who occasionally give the party their support. The non-elite are not as emotionally invested in the political process as the middle-elite and are less likely to be motivated by ideological concerns. It is considered to be the least ideological of the three strata, consisting of rational actors who support the party which adopts political stances closest to their own personal leanings (again, in concordance with the median voter theorem).

== Examples ==
=== The British Labour Party ===
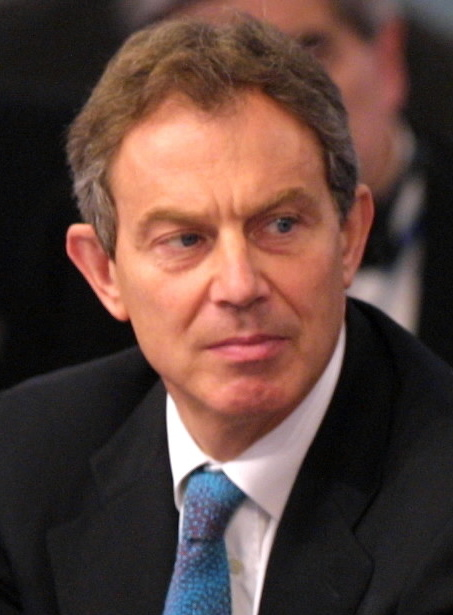
Tony Blair in 2002 during his prime ministership. The man who moved Labour to the right.

Under the leadership of Tony Blair, the British Labour Party shifted towards a market-oriented approach to political campaigning. This caused an ideological fissure within the party between advocates of the New Labour approach and traditional supporters. In terms of electoral strategy, the New Labour approach involved tailoring the "political brand" of the party to suit the preferences of the electorate. These preferences were chiefly ascertained by focus group studies and opinion polls. In effect, market-oriented campaigning assisted the Labour Party in making its policies consistent with the preferences of the median voter.

Many traditional supporters, however, resented what they regarded as the dilution of the ideological foundation of the party. Conversely, other senior Labour politicians argued against what they perceived to be the overly ideological policy positions of the pre-Blair era which had failed to take account of wider public opinion. Sir Gerald Kaufman, for example, famously described Labour's 1983 election manifesto as "the longest suicide note in history". Similarly, Charles Clarke, who was a supporter of Tony Blair and served as a minister in his government, described the difficulty in appeasing disaffected members as follows:

"In the old days the idea of the Labour Party was defined by a series of policy positions – unilateral disarmament, exit from the European Union, opposition to the sale of council houses and nationalisation. The question then arose as to whether that range of policies were right for the current era. The whole odyssey that the Labour Party took from 1979 to 1997 was an attempt to face up to the fact that the electorate thought that these sets of policies were not things that should govern this country. Some people didn't go down that odyssey of change and they remain as a group that is of no significance at all in the political life of the country".

Using May's terminology, the advocates of the New Labour approach can be regarded as the party elite, whereas the disaffected members can be viewed as the middle-elite, with the latter being more ideologically motivated and less moderate than the former. The primary concern of the party elite was to ensure the future electability of the party, having learned lessons and modified policy in response to prior electoral failures. The main objective of the middle-elite, however, was to preserve the socialist ideological heritage of the party and represent its traditional core constituencies (i.e. unions and the working class), regardless of the electoral consequences. There are some inconsistencies involved, in transposing May's typology to this example. Some of the critics of the New Labour project (such as Tony Benn), for example, were members of parliament and therefore theoretically part of the party elite themselves.

=== The Danish Venstre Party ===
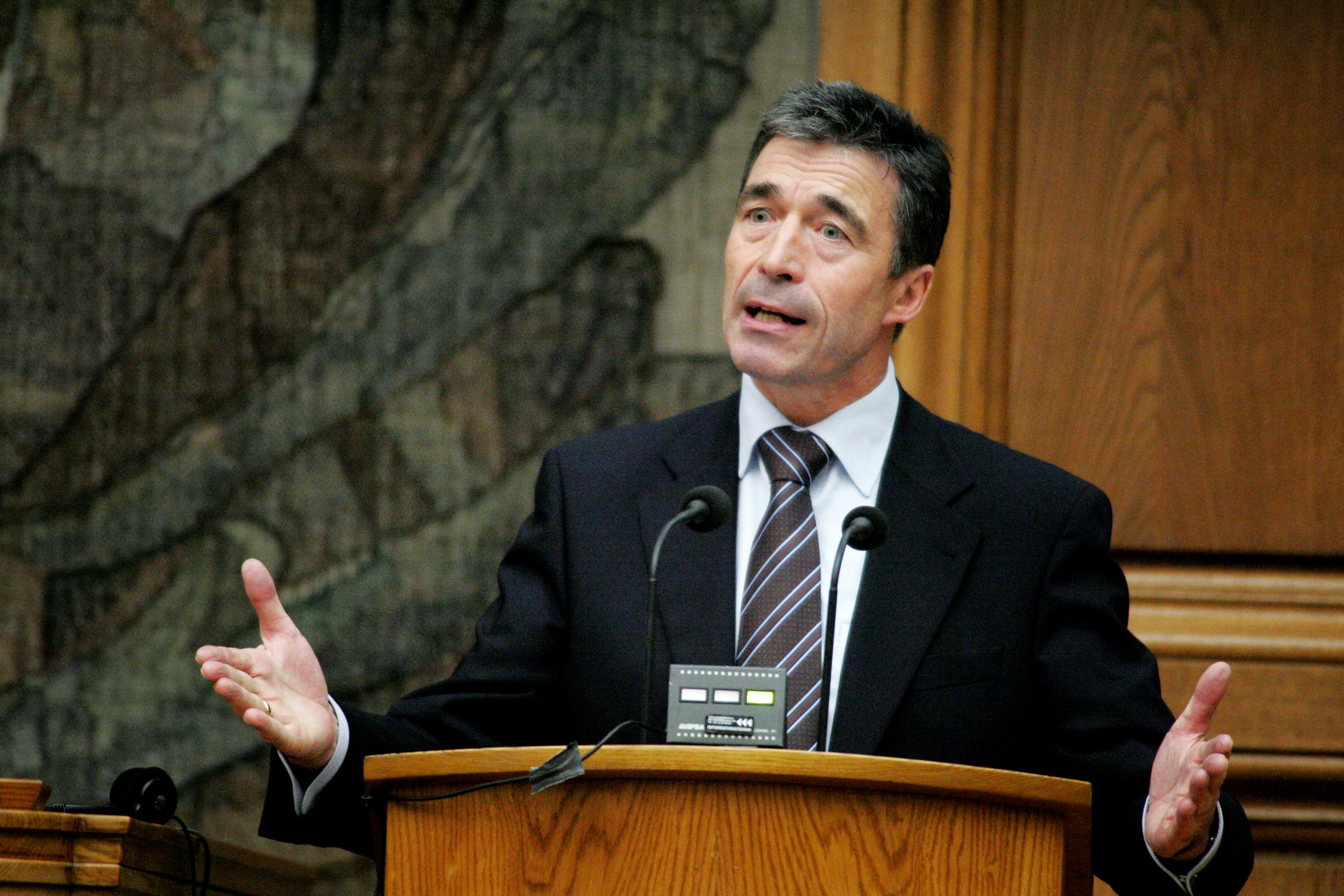
Anders Fogh Rasmussen who made Venstre more centrist addressing Parliament in 2006 during his prime ministership

After the so-called 'blue bloc' (a coalition of conservative and economic liberal parties) had lost both the 1994 and 1998 general elections the main centre-right party, Venstre decided in 1999 under the leadership of Anders Fogh Rasmussen to fundamentally change its strategy. In essence, Venstre largely gave up convincing voters about classical liberal positions and instead embraced large parts of the Social Democrats' policies, especially on welfare with important exceptions such as the "tax stop". This caused a deviation from several parts of Venstre's ideological basis including Fogh repudiating many of the views expressed in his own 1993 book From Social State to Minimal State in which he had argued for limited government and in favour of free markets.

Several sources describe Venstre deputy mayor of Copenhagen, Søren Pind, gifting Fogh a copy of The Unfinished Revolution by advertising executive for Tony Blair, Philip Gould. Fogh applied Gould's analysis for Labour to Venstre and the analysis for Conservatives to the Social Democrats. Fogh for instance made a direct translation of Labour's slogan "Time For A Change" into "Tid til forandring" that replaced Venstre's former slogan "Venstre ved du, hvor du har" ("Venstre you know where you got".

The County Mayor Carl Holst criticised in 2000 a lack of ideological edge stating that the party base had not been properly involved.

This shift became known as the so-called Hjort doctrine (Danish: Hjort-doktrinen) named after the party's party secretary Claus Hjort Frederiksen. During the campaign for the 2022 general election Hjort described the strategy as follows:

"Our attention towards Blå Bjarne (Blue Bjarne) (Note: Blå Bjarne was the internal way in Venstre in which refer to the so-called safety voters; a voter group above all concerned with safety having little to no ideological preferences. Bjarne being a typical Danish name.) arose very clearly at the election in 1998, when Venstre was one seat from the prime ministership. We had during the years polled that many voters shared our basic perception that it should be worth working, but still did not vote for us on election day. They were afraid of what would happen with us in power if they became unemployed or sick. Therefore, we decided to alter our policies so that we from 2001 did not run on major tax cuts, but instead presented the tax stop. That way, there were no drastic consequences for voting for us. That policy proved to be very, very durable".

Following the next election in 2001 incumbent prime minister Poul Nyrup Rasmussen from the Social Democrats lost his majority and Fogh became new prime minister in which office he continued until April 2009.

== Analysis and criticism ==
There is a lack of consensus among political scientists over the frequency and extent to which Curvilinear Disparity takes place. In a study by Kitschelt and Hellemans (1990), it is posited that whether Curvilinear Disparity occurs (and, if so, to what extent) depends on the degree to which "ideologues... capture less highly valued positions" within a party. In an analysis of the subject by Norris (1995), however, British party elites were found on average to be more ideologically motivated than both the middle-elite and the non-elite, contrary to theoretical expectations.
