= Immigration policy of Mette Frederiksen =

The immigration policy of Mette Frederiksen, leader of the Danish Social Democrats and Prime Minister of Denmark since 2019, have attracted significant attention and commentary. According to Marie Sandberg of the University of Copenhagen, the Danish government under Frederiksen positioned itself as a "pioneer in restrictive migration policies."

== Background ==
Immigration to Denmark has increased significantly since the 1980s. The immigration policy of the Danish Social Democrats began to shift towards the right following the 2001 Danish general election, in which the Social Democrats lost eleven seats and the Danish People's Party gained nine seats, with the right-wing parties gaining an overall majority in the Folketing for the first time and with immigration being one of the main topics debated during the election. According to Anna Bailey-Morley and Claire Kumar of ODI Global, the Social Democrats interpreted the results as being because "the DPP were taking votes from their working-class electoral base," justifying a subsequent shift in party policy on immigration "not as an opportunistic shift in core political values, but as inkeeping with long-held values of protecting the Danish welfare system, which the party argues is being drained by immigration." Following the 2001 election, the right-wing government in Denmark began implementing increasingly restrictive immigration laws, a trend that accelerated in the 2010s following the 2015 European migrant crisis.

Mette Frederiksen became leader of the Danish Social Democrats in 2015, the party then being in the opposition in the Danish parliament. Under Frederiksen, the Social Democrats supported the increasing restrictions on immigration advanced by the right-wing government of Lars Løkke Rasmussen and his Venstre party and began moving their own immigration policies even further rightwards. Among the government policies supported by Frederiksen where the controversial policy to seize any valuables owned by asylum seekers in the country. During the 2019 Danish general election, Frederiksen's Social Democrats ran on an explicitly anti-immigration platform. After the party won the elections, she became Prime Minister of Denmark.

== Policy ==
Under Frederiksen, the Social Democrats-led government of Denmark has continued the trend of increasingly restrictive immigration policies that began in Denmark in 2001.

=== Asylum policies ===
In 2021, the Danish government under Frederiksen announced its goal of having "zero asylum seekers." That year, it became the first European government to deport Syrian refugees back to Syria, decreeing that parts of the country were safe, despite the still-ongoing Syrian civil war. Also that year, the Danish government passed a law to deport new asylum seekers to third countries, so that the asylum claims could be processed from abroad and successful asylum seekers resettled outside of Denmark.

In 2022, following the start of the Ukrainian refugee crisis caused by the Russian invasion of Ukraine, Frederiksen modified Danish asylum laws to exempt Ukrainian asylum seekers from restrictions placed on other asylum seekers.

=== European policies ===
The Danish government under Frederiksen supported the New Pact on Migration and Asylum, proposed by the European Commission in 2020 and to be implemented in 2026.

In May 2025, Frederiksen and Prime Minister of Italy Giorgia Meloni composed an open letter, subsequently signed by seven other European prime ministers, calling for the European Convention on Human Rights to be amended to make it easier for governments to pursue restrictive immigration policies.

In July 2025, the 2025 Danish Presidency of the Council of the European Union began, lasting until the end of 2025. In her speech marking the debut of the Danish presidency, Frederiksen pointed towards restricting immigration laws across Europe as a priority. She stated that "we have to lower the influx of migrants to Europe," saying that "it is challenging Europe, affecting people’s lives, and the cohesion of our societies. We saw it very clearly in the European Parliament elections last year. Migration was a top priority for many Europeans, including myself."

=== Statements by Frederiksen ===
In a September 2024 interview with Bloomberg, Frederiksen stated that "we should have changed the rules and the legislation in Europe a long time ago," saying that "we can help many more people if we help outside Europe. If too many people from outside Europe enter Europe, the problems with lack of integration will simply be too big and too massive."

In March 2025, Frederiksen expressed support for Vice President of the United States JD Vance's stance on immigration, saying that "I consider this mass migration into Europe as a threat to the daily life in Europe."

== Debates ==
=== Effects on immigration levels to Denmark ===
According to the BBC News, the number of applications for asylum in Denmark declined significantly under Frederiksen, reaching by early 2025 the lowest levels since the 1980s.

Jakob Schwörer and Kristina Birke Daniels of the Friedrich Ebert Foundation have argued that "there is little evidence that the harsh migration and integration policies have actually led to more repatriations and fewer asylum applications, although the Danish Social Democrats repeatedly make this claim... While it is true that the number of new asylum applications in Denmark has decreased significantly since 2015 (but less so after the paradigm shift in 2019), a comparison with the other Nordic countries (which still have less restrictive migration policies than Denmark) shows that this is not a phenomenon specific to Denmark but is influenced by other factors (such as the Covid 19 pandemic or international crises such as Russia’s full scale invasion of Ukraine)."

=== Effects on the far-right ===
Some commentators have argued that Frederiksen's policies have prevented far-right political parties from gaining ground during the early 2020s, unlike in other European countries. These commentators argue that the policies have succeeded by reducing the saliency of immigration in political debates, and therefore defusing the ability of the far-right to capitalise on immigration concerns. Martin Engell-Rossen, one of Frederiksen's key strategists, has argued that the policies have succeeded because:

1. Prior to 2015, the Social Democrats had lost credibility with working class and rural voters, and that Frederiksen's policies have restored that credibility;
2. That Frederiksen managed to present her anti-immigration beliefs as credible, despite being leader of a centre-left party, by rhetorically linking it to the Nordic model of social democracy and by linking it to progressive Danish cultural values like women's rights;
3. That Frederiksen has combined anti-immigration policies with economic reforms such as pension reform that help the working class;
4. That Frederiksen has tightly enforced message discipline among the Social Democrats and her government.

Other commentators, however, have argued that Frederiksen's policies have not resulted in a decrease in popularity for far-right parties and far-right rhetoric in Denmark, including Michelle Pace of Chatham House and Cas Mudde of the University of Georgia. These commentators argue that policies like Frederiksen have the effect of boosting anti-immigration beliefs among the population instead of satiating those beliefs. At the same time, those among the population that already supported restrictions on immigration were unlikely to be believe that mainstream parties like the Social Democrats are genuine in their desire to reduce immigration, leading to a boost for the far-right. Critics of Frederiksen's policies also argue that there is minimal evidence that her policies have successfully reduced the far-right in Denmark, saying that the combined share of voting intention for far-right parties (including the DPP, the New Right, and the Denmark Democrats) has remained relatively stable between 2015 and 2025, even if the DPP's individual position in polls has dropped.

=== Influence on other governments ===
According to Alberto Horst Neidhardt of the European Policy Centre, Frederiksen's immigration policies had become "the new normal" among European governments by 2025, as "what's considered 'good' migration policies these days has moved to the right, even for centre left governments."

Frederiksen's policies have been cited as having an influence on right-wing governments in Europe, including Ulf Kristersson's Moderate Party government in Sweden. In the United Kingdom, the Rwanda asylum plan, advanced by the Conservative Party government between 2022 and 2024, was influenced by Frederiksen's policies.

Frederiksen's policies have also been cited as having a significant influence on centre-left governments in Europe. Sarah Wolff of Leiden University has argued that "you increasingly see supposedly liberal countries that are signatories to international conventions, like human rights law, coming back on those conventions because the legislation no longer fits the political agenda of the moment." The Labour Party of Keir Starmer has been named as being influenced by Frederiksen's policies, with officials in Starmer's government directly communicating with Frederiksen's government over her policies.
