= Claus Hjort Frederiksen =

Danish politician

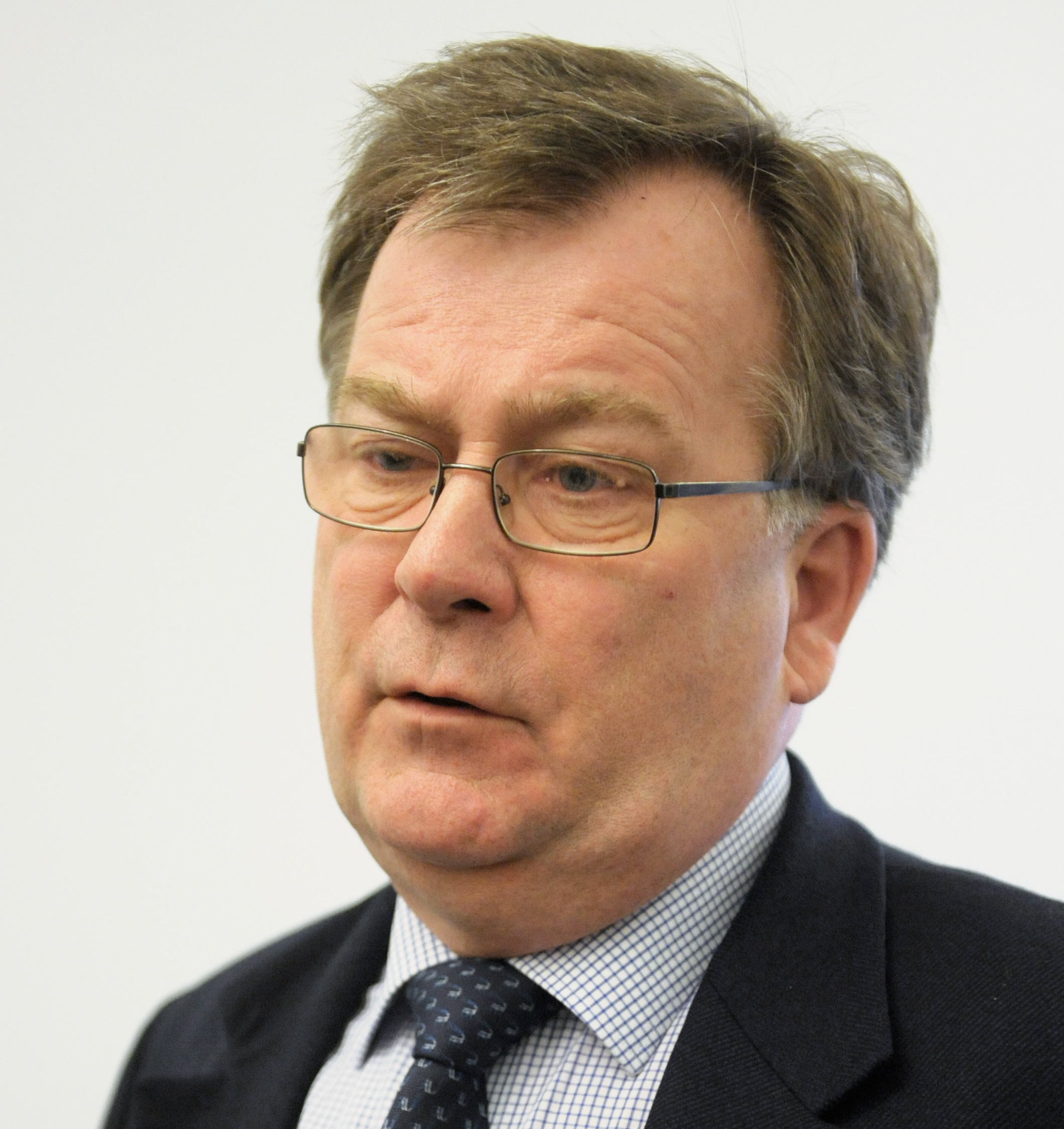

Minister of Defence
- In office 28 November 2016 – 27 June 2019
- Prime Minister: Lars Løkke Rasmussen
- Preceded by: Peter Christensen
- Succeeded by: Trine Bramsen

Minister of Finance
- In office 28 June 2015 – 28 November 2016
- Prime Minister: Lars Løkke Rasmussen
- Preceded by: Bjarne Corydon
- Succeeded by: Kristian Jensen
- In office 7 April 2009 – 3 October 2011
- Prime Minister: Lars Løkke Rasmussen
- Preceded by: Lars Løkke Rasmussen
- Succeeded by: Bjarne Corydon

Minister for Employment
- In office 27 November 2001 – 7 April 2009
- Prime Minister: Anders Fogh Rasmussen
- Preceded by: Ove Hygum
- Succeeded by: Inger Støjberg

Member of the Folketing
- In office 8 February 2005 – 1 November 2022
- Constituency: North Zealand (2007–2022); Copenhagen (2005–2007)

Personal details
- Born: 4 September 1947 (age 79) Copenhagen, Denmark
- Party: Venstre
- Education: University of Copenhagen

Claus Hjort Frederiksen (born 4 September 1947) is a Danish politician of the Venstre party, who served as the Danish Minister for Defence from 2016 to 2019, and as Minister for Finance from 2015 to 2016, having previously served in that position from 2009 to 2011, as member of the first Løkke Rasmussen Cabinet. From 2001 to 2009, he was Minister of Employment in the first, second, and third cabinets of Anders Fogh Rasmussen.

He is a member of the liberal party Venstre. He was a member of the Danish Parliament Folketinget since 2005 until 2022. Hjort was one of the main strategist behind the strategy shift in Venstre following the defeat in the 1998 general election known as the so-called Hjort doctrine (Danish: Hjort-doktrinen).

== Early life ==
He graduated in law from University of Copenhagen.

== Political career ==
Frederiksen served as party secretary of Venstre 1985–2001, and as such he served as Fogh Rasmussen's closest advisor in creating the political program that eventually led to Fogh Rasmussen's ascent to the office of Prime Minister. The political program involved a closer relationship and dependency on the Danish People's Party and Frederiksen has notedly remarked that there exists a special community of values between said party and Venstre.

Frederiksen was first elected into the Folketing in the 2005 election, and was reelected in the following elections in 2007, 2011, 2015 and 2019.

== Controversies ==
In 2009 radio journalist Jesper Tynell won the Cavling Prize for a series of 15 radio spots in DR P1's ”Orientering” showing [the]"minister's less democratic methods". Among the revelations were:

- Claus Hjort Frederiksen (as Minister of Employment) gave the parliament false information.
- The Minister abolished the requirements to foreign worker safety in dangerous jobs - in secret and outside parliament.
- The Ministry asked the municipal administers to rule (the so-called 300-hour rule) in an illegal manner.
- The Ministry ordered misleading figures from Arbejdsmarkedsstyrelsen to turn the public debate to their advantage.
- Officials deleted incriminating documents from the Ministry's own archives.

== Treason charges ==
In January 2022, Claus Frederiksen announced he had been charged with violating a section of the Danish penal code which includes treason for leaking state secrets, which carries a maximum sentence of 12 years in prison. According to his party, Frederiksen was charged with leaking information to the media. Though the specifics of the leaked information is not publicly known, many have speculated it is related to interviews wherein Frederiksen revealed information about Danish cooperation with the American National Security Agency.

On 27 October 2023 the Supreme Court ruled against the prosecution's demand that the charges against Frederiksen were to not be made public. On 1 November 2023 the prosecution dropped their charges against Frederiksen, along with similar charges against Lars Findsen, after a Supreme Court ruling prevented the trial from being carried out without breaching confidentiality of classified information.

Political offices
Preceded by Ove Hygum	Minister for Employment; 2001–2009	Succeeded by Inger Støjberg
Preceded by Lars Løkke Rasmussen	Minister for Finance; 2009–2011	Succeeded by Bjarne Corydon
Preceded by Bjarne Corydon	Minister for Finance; 2015–2016	Succeeded by Kristian Jensen
Preceded by Peter Christensen	Minister for Defence; 2016–2019	Succeeded by Trine Bramsen
