= Dagbladet Børsen =

Danish newspaper

- The logo since 2011
- Type: Newspaper
- Format: Compact
- Owner(s): Bonnier Group;JP/Politikens Hus
- Founder: Theodor Hans Carsten Green
- Publisher: Dagbladet Børsen A/S
- Editor: Bjarne Corydon
- Founded: 1896; 130 years ago
- Political alignment: Economic liberalism
- Language: Danish
- Headquarters: Copenhagen, Denmark
- Circulation: 57,144 (second half of 2013)
- Website: borsen.dk

Børsen (full name: Dagbladet Børsen) is a Danish newspaper specialising in business news published in Denmark.

== History and profile ==
Børsen was founded in 1896 by merchant and editor Theodor Hans Carsten Green. In 1899, it was changed into a newspaper with a particular focus on business and stock exchange content. From then and until 1909, Børsen was also formally associated with Grosserer-Societetet (English: The Merchant Society).

In 1969, the majority shareholder became the Swedish Bonnier Group. The publishing house changed its name to Forlaget Børsen Ltd. In 1970, the paper was reorganized to almost exclusively feature business news, resulting in an improved net circulation. The success of the Swedish business magazine Veckans Affärer was functional in this change.

In January 2016, negotiations were underway for Bonnier Group to sell Børsen to JP/Politikens Hus at the price of 800 million kroner. The Danish Competition and Consumer Authority (Konkurrence- og Forbrugerstyrelsen) indicated that it was opposed to a merger because the combined company would be too dominant in the Danish market. On Tuesday, 24 January 2017, JP/Politikens Hus A/S said it had withdrawn its offer to merge with Dagbladet Børsen and instead had opted for a 49.9% ownership of Dagbladet Børsen for a price of 400 million Danish kroner. Bonnier Group would have a 50.1% ownership of the company.

Børsen is published on weekdays, not on weekends, and is based in Copenhagen.

Børsen has no political affiliation, but it supports the free market economy and private business as well as worldwide trade. The paper publishes a list, Børsen Guld.

== Circulation ==
In 1948, the circulation of Børsen was 8,400 copies. During the last six months of 1957, the paper had a circulation of 7,552 copies on weekdays. It was 7,413 copies in 1960 and 6,934 copies in 1970. Its circulation rose to 31,414 copies in 1980 and to 42,933 copies in 1990. From 1991 to 1994, the paper had a fixed circulation of 42,000 copies. Its circulation was 41,000 copies in 1995, again 42,000 copies in 1996 and 41,000 copies in 1997. It slightly rose to 43,000 copies in 1998 and to 45,000 copies in 1999.

Børsen had a circulation of 53,000 copies for both the first quarter of 2000 and for 2000 as a whole, making it one of the top 20 newspapers in the country. Its circulation was 58,000 copies in 2001, 60,000 copies in 2002. and 62,000 copies in 2003 and 67,000 copies in 2004. In 2005, its coverage reached 236,000 people with a total coverage of 570,000 people when its website and accompanying magazines were included. The same year, its circulation was 68,900 copies.

The circulation of Børsen was 70,503 copies in 2006 and 71,419 copies in 2007. The paper had a circulation of 72,086 copies in 2008 and 72,490 copies in 2009. It was 72,868 copies in 2010 and 66,639 copies in 2011. The net circulation per issue was 57,144 copies in the second half of 2013.

== Design ==
Since 1 March 1993, the newspaper has stood out by its use of salmon-pink paper, an intentional reference to the British Financial Times. As of 2011, the newspaper was redesigned, incorporating salmon-pink further by also using the color across all platforms. Magenta was also chosen as a signal color, PT Serif as the primary typeface, and the logo was replaced by a new, hand-drawn one made by the Danish designer Jan Andersen.
