= Misconduct =

Legal term; form of wrongful, improper, or unlawful conduct

Misconduct is wrongful, improper, or unlawful conduct motivated by premeditated or intentional purpose or by obstinate indifference to the consequences of one's acts. It is an act which is forbidden or a failure to do that which is required. Misconduct may involve harm to another person's health or well-being.

Misconduct is of particular importance in professional settings (e.g. lawyers, scientists, doctors, military personnel), in the workplace and various institutions (e.g. schools, hospitals, prisons). Two categories of misconduct are sexual misconduct and official misconduct. In connection with school discipline, "misconduct" is generally understood to be student behavior that is unacceptable to school officials but does not violate criminal statutes, including absenteeism, tardiness, bullying, and inappropriate language. Misconduct in the workplace generally falls under two categories. Minor misconduct is seen as unacceptable but is not a criminal offense (e.g. persistent lateness). Gross misconduct is misconduct that is serious enough to potentially warrant immediate dismissal, and which may in some cases constitute criminal behaviour, e.g. stealing or sexual harassment.

== Organizational ==
Organization and management scholars have paid much attention to the causes, forms, modes of development, and consequences of misconduct within or among organizations. They have studied different types of misconduct, such as white-collar crimes, insider trading, or deceptive accounting. Financial misconduct became prominent after the 2008 financial crisis that revealed how financial organizations can operate profitable illicit activities over decades. Organizational misconduct can involve many organizations that collaborate, such as the case of cartels where firms reduce competition by agreeing on production or pricing, then conceal their actions together and maintain collective secret.

== Financial ==
The failure to understand and manage ethical risks played a significant role in the 2008 financial crisis. The difference between bad business decisions and business misconduct can be hard to determine, and there is a thin line between the ethics of using only financial incentives to gauge performance and the use of holistic measures that include ethics, transparency and responsibility of stakeholders. From CEO's to traders and brokers, all-too-tempting lucrative financial incentives existed for performance in the financial industry.
The past widespread financial misconduct led to a call for financial reform. The Dodd-Frank Wall Street Reform and Consumer Protection Act was passed in 2010 to increase accountability and transparency in the financial industry and protect consumers from deceptive financial practices.

== Police misconduct ==
Police misconduct is inappropriate conduct and illegal actions taken by police officers.

== See also ==
- Abuse of power – Unlawful use of powers in an official capacity
- Sexual harassment – Unwanted sexual attention or advances
- Scientific misconduct – Violation of codes of scholarly conduct and ethical behavior in scientific research
- Judicial misconduct – Instances when a judge acts unethically
- Workplace bullying – Harmful mistreatment of others in the workplace
