= Politics of Greenland =

The politics of Greenland, an autonomous country (Greenlandic: nuna, Danish: land) within the Kingdom of Denmark, function in a framework of a parliamentary representative democratic dependency, whereby the prime minister is the head of government, and of a multi-party system. Executive power is exercised by the government. Legislative power is vested in both the government and parliament Inatsisartut. The judiciary is independent of the executive and the legislature. Greenland has full autonomy on most matters, except on policies and decisions affecting the region including negotiations with the devolved legislatures and the Folketing (English: Parliament of Denmark).

== Executive powers ==
Main office-holders
Office	Name	Party	Since
King	Frederik X		14 January 2024
High Commissioner	Julie Præst Wilche		1 May 2022
Prime Minister	Jens-Frederik Nielsen	Demokraatit	7 April 2025

Executive power rests with a high commissioner, and a prime minister heads the Cabinet. The high commissioner of Greenland is appointed by the monarch, and the prime minister is elected indirectly by parliament elections results for four-year terms.

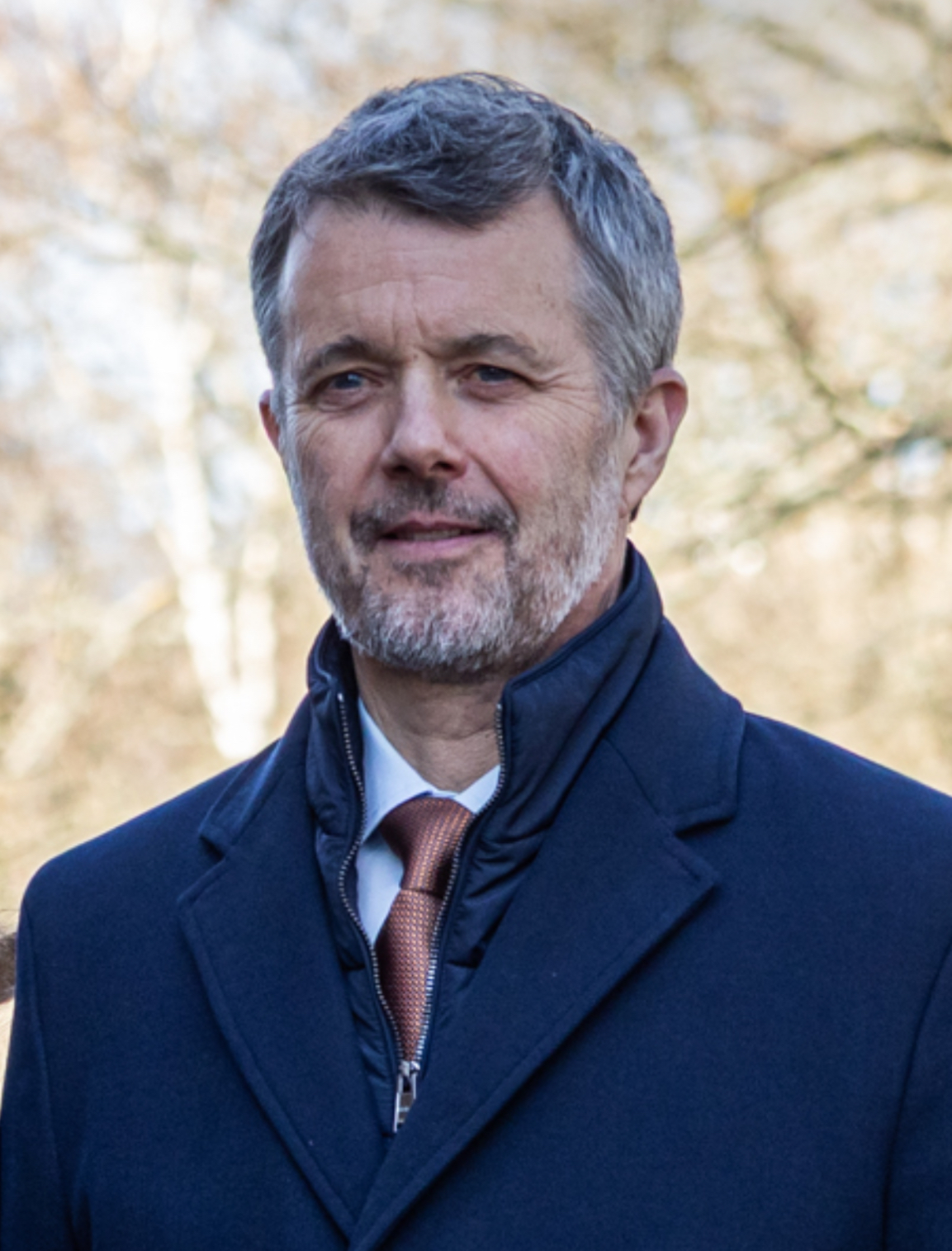
Frederik X, King since 2024

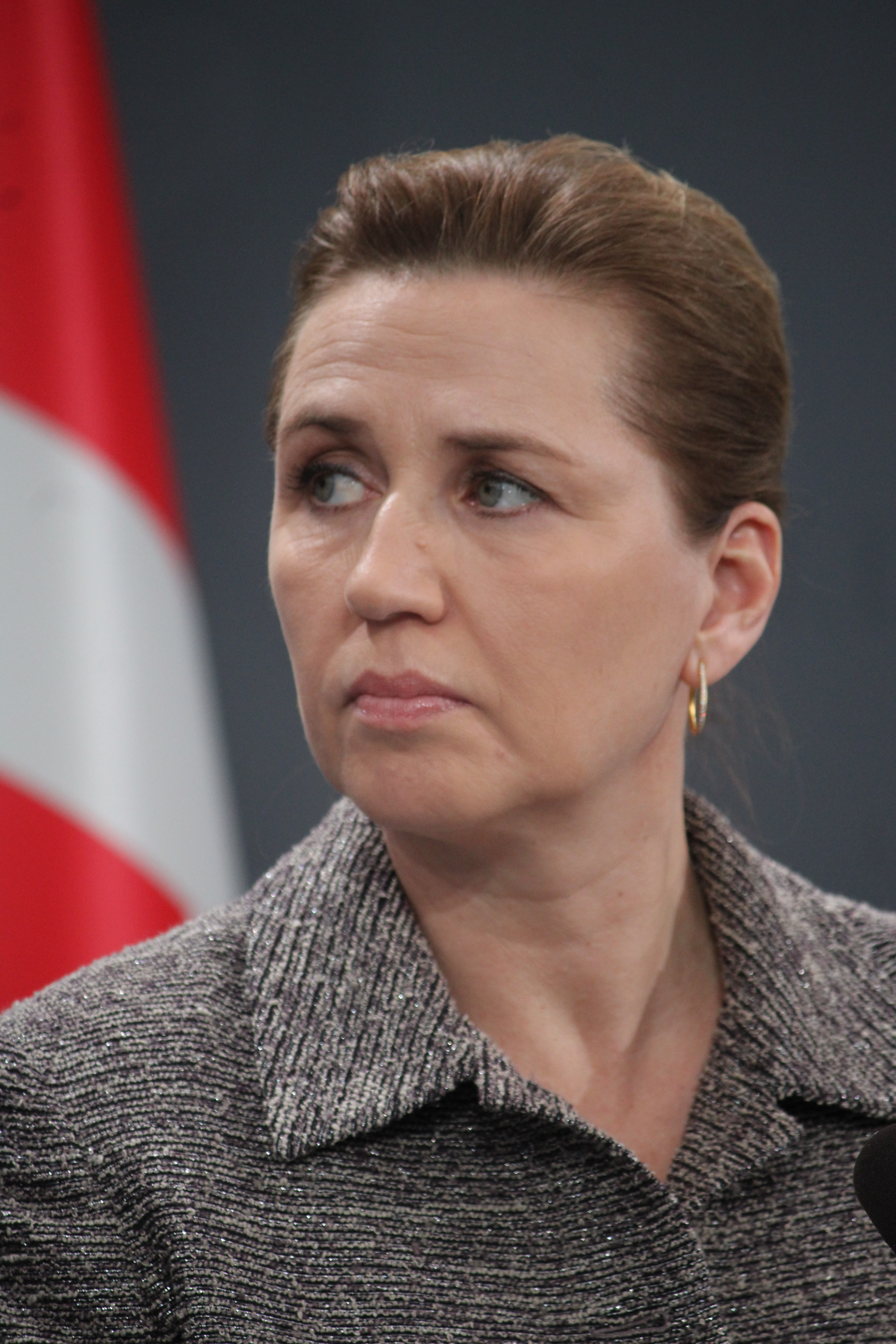
Mette Frederiksen, Prime Minister since 2019

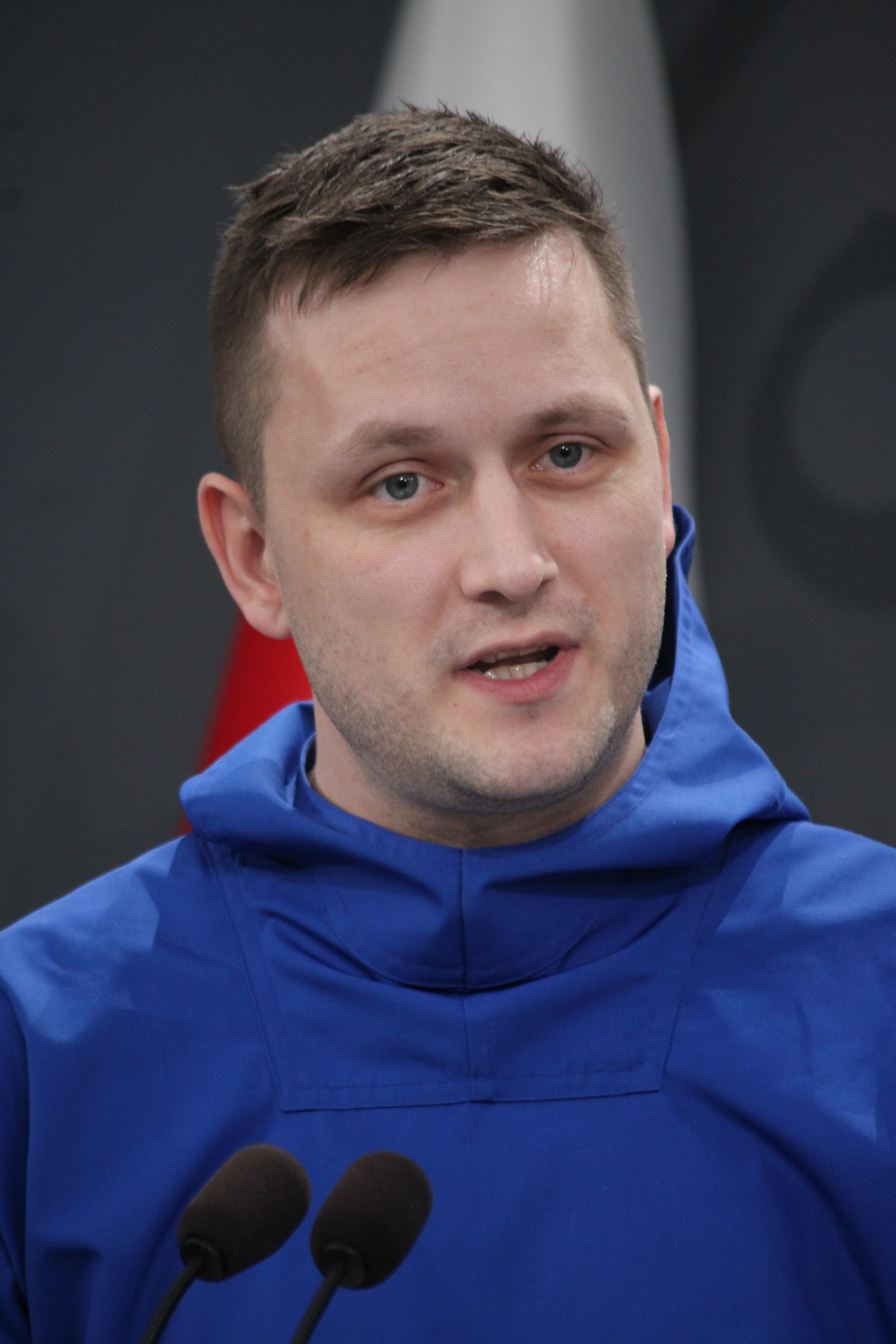
Jens-Frederik Nielsen, Premier since 2025

The High Commissioner has a seat in the Inatsisartut. The high commissioner is allowed to speak in the Inatsisartut regarding common Danish/Greenlandic affairs, but is not allowed to vote. Following legislative elections, the leader of the party that wins the most seats is usually given the initiative to establish a new coalition by the Greenlandic Parliament, unless the current Naalakkersuisut Siulittaasuat (Prime Minister in English) is still in power. However, if he/she fails, the chairman of the parliament asks all chairmen of the parties elected to the parliament, and asks them to point to another chairman who they feel can rightly form a new coalition. The chairman with the most votes is then handed the initiative. After forming the coalition, the Naalakkersuisut Siulittaasuat leads the Naalakkersuisut. The Naalakkersuisut will often consist of around 9 members. The coalition parties divide the various ministries among themselves and after this, the parties elect their representative to these ministries. Any other member of the cabinet is called a Naalakkersuisoq.

== Legislative branch ==
Legislative power is shared by the government and the legislature. The legislature Greenlandic Parliament (Greenlandic: Inatsisartut) is made up of 31 members elected by direct, popular vote to serve four-year terms by proportional representation. Election of 2 seats to the Danish Parliament (Danish: Folketing) was last held on November 1st, 2022. The composition after the 2025 Greenlandic general election is shown below.

Party	Votes	%	+/–	Seats	+/–
Democrats	8,563	30.26	+21.01	10	+7
Naleraq	7,009	24.77	+12.51	8	+4
Inuit Ataqatigiit	6,119	21.62	–15.82	7	–5
Siumut	4,210	14.88	–15.22	4	–6
Atassut	2,092	7.39	+0.31	2	0
Qulleq	305	1.08	New	0	New
Total	28,298	100.00	–	31	0
Valid votes	28,298	98.87			
Invalid/blank votes	322	1.13			
Total votes	28,620	100.00			
Registered voters/turnout	40,369	70.90	+4.98		
Source: Qinersineq.gl

== Judicial branch ==
Greenland's judicial system is based on the Danish civil law system, operates independently of the legislature and the executive. It has two court of first instance: the District Courts and the Court of Greenland depending on the type of case, whereas the High Court of Greenland hears cases as the second instance. Decisions made by the High Court of Greenland may be brought before the Supreme Court subject to the permission of the Appeals Permission Board. Appeals may be submitted to the Østre Landsret and the Supreme Court of Denmark (Højesteret).

== Political parties and elections ==
Greenland has a multi-party system (disputing independence versus unionism as well as left versus right). Governments are usually coalition governments. The Greenlandic Parliament (Inatsisartut) has 31 seats. Members are elected by popular vote to serve four-year terms.

== Administrative divisions ==
The island is administratively divided into 5 municipalities with about 72 cities and villages.

== International affairs ==
Along with diplomatic missions to the European Union and the United States, Greenland participates in, among others, the Nordic Council, Arctic Council, and International Whaling Commission.

With Denmark having responsibility for Greenland's international affairs, other countries do not have direct diplomatic representation in Greenland — their embassies or consulates in Copenhagen are responsible for their relations with Greenland and their citizens staying or living there.

Greenland is represented internationally by the embassies and consulates of Denmark, although Greenland has an independent Representation to the European Union in Brussels since 1992 and in the United States in Washington D.C since 2014.

Greenland maintains economic and cultural relations with Taiwan via Taipei Economic and Cultural Office in Canada.

=== International organization participation ===
- Arctic Council
- Council of Europe
- Inuit Circumpolar Conference
- NATO
- Nordic Council
- Nordic Investment Bank
- West Nordic Council

== See also ==
- Arctic cooperation and politics
- Arctic policy of Denmark
- Politics of Denmark
- List of Danish High Commissioners in Greenland
- Foreign relations of Greenland
- Greenland–European Union relations
