= Press Council =

Press Council may refer to:

- International Press Telecommunications Council, a consortium of the world's major news agencies and news industry vendors
- Australian Press Council
- Danish Press Council, a Danish independent public tribunal press council under the Ministry of Justice
- Myanmar Press Council
- New Zealand Press Council, an industry body that oversees complaints against print media
- Ontario Press Council
- Polish Media Council
- Press Council of India, a statutory body in India that governs the conduct of the print and broadcast media
- Press Council (Indonesia)
- Press Council (UK), a British voluntary press organisation that was succeeded by the Press Complaints Commission in 1990
- Swedish Press Council
