= Fighters+Lovers =

Fighters+Lovers is a group consisting of 7 Danish people. The group has made a clothing company, brand and record label which sells controversial T-shirts, perfumes and CDs. The T-shirts feature logos of the FARC and the PFLP. These groups have been labeled by the United States Government and the European Union as terrorist groups. The company sold the T-shirts and collected 24.982 DKK (about $5000) and they were going to send the money to a radio station run by FARC and a printing press run by PFLP, however the money never made it to these groups because the police arrested the 7 people in February 2006 and withheld the funds.

On November 5, 2007, the group released a CD for sale called "Cumbia Clash – from the jungle to the streets" with songs supporting the FARC in techno/cumbia. During the event members of the company criticized the President of Colombia, Álvaro Uribe and described the country's political establishment as an "illegal state."

== Court cases ==
The seven members of Fighters+Lovers were accused by the Danish Prosecution Service of violating the European Union's anti-terrorism laws. On December 13, 2007, all seven accused were acquitted of the charges. The case was appealed to the second highest court in Denmark Landsretten, the judges found 6 of the seven guilty in supporting terrorist organizations, one was found innocent. Two were sentenced to 6 months in Prison, two others got 4 months suspended sentences and two got a 60 days suspended sentence.

The groups lawyer Thorkild Høyer told the press that he would try and appeal the case to the Danish high court Højesteret.

Latest news in the case, is that they have just been granted permission by Procesbevillingsnævnet to appeal the verdict to the supreme court.

== Criticism ==
The case against Fighters+Lovers has been criticised in Denmark for its cost. So far the price of the court cases has exceeded 1 million DKK (US$200,000) which seems out of proportion given the fact that the amount to be sent was only 25,000 DKK (US$5,000).

Camilo Jiménez, a correspondent in Germany for Colombian magazine Revista Semana, characterized Fighters + Lovers as "evidently indifferent" to the suffering of those victimized by FARC's activities in Colombia and described the group's efforts as a "childish game" for the sake of challenging Danish anti-terror laws.

== Support ==
The group behind Fighters+Lovers has gotten support from Horserød-Stutthof Foreningen, which includes among its members former participants in the Danish resistance movement. When the Danish terror-law was first implemented they sent 1000DKK (US$200) to FARC and informed the Ministry of Justice of Denmark that they had done so. They also sent the same amount to PFLP in support of Fighters+Lovers. The Ministry of Justice has not reacted yet.
