= Aarhus Courthouse =

Coordinates: 56°09′15.0″N 10°12′03.3″E

- Retten i Aarhus / Tinghuset
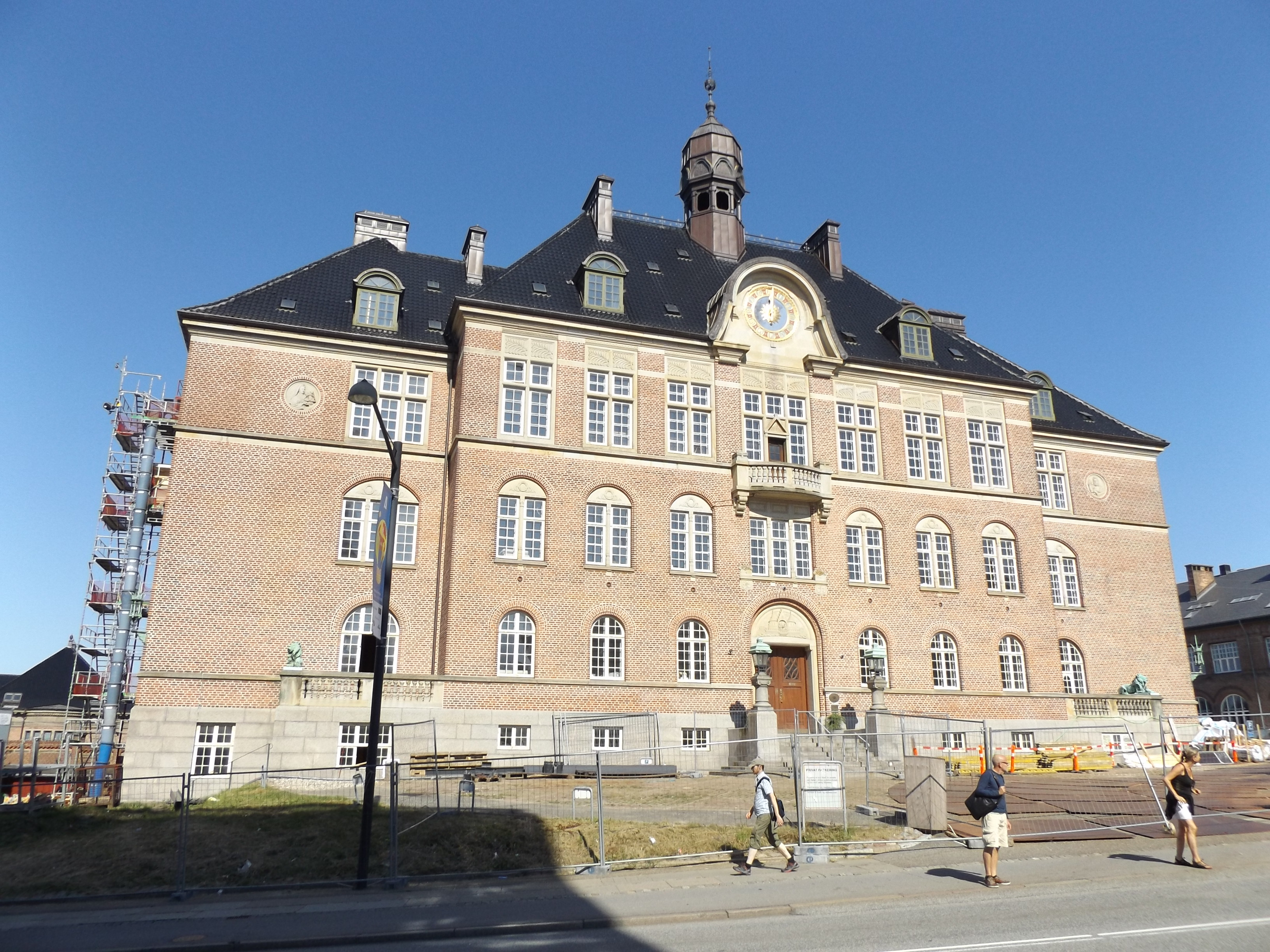
- Aarhus Courthouse
- Interactive map of the Aarhus Courthouse area

General information
- Architectural style: Art Nouveau
- Location: Midtown, Aarhus, Denmark
- Completed: 1906
- Client: City of Aarhus

Design and construction
- Architects: L.A. Ludvigsen, Julius Hansen

The Aarhus Courthouse (Danish: Tinghuset) is a historic building located on Vester Allé in Aarhus, Denmark. Originally built as a combined Courthouse and jail, it now serves as the seat of Aarhus County Court while the High Court of Western Denmark (Vestre Landsret), based in Viborg, has a courtroom there. Inaugurated in 1906, it was built to the design of L.A. Ludvigsen and Julius Hansen in the Art Nouveau style.

== History ==
By the turn of the 20th century a new courthouse was badly needed in Aarhus. The population had more than doubled in the preceding 40 years and the existing jailhouse was dilapidated with prisoners regularly finding ways to escape. The Old City Hall functioned as courthouse and police station as well as city hall at the time, and space was short. It was evident to the city council that a new solution was needed with new, large and modern buildings. The decision process was however complicated since the city of Aarhus and the surrounding hundreds and Århus County all jointly managed the court facilities in the city while any changes would have to be approved by the Danish Ministry of Justice.

It was decided the new courthouse should be situated on Bispetoften and a committee was established to find a suitable proposal for the structure. In 1901 the committee issued a contest for the courthouse along with a list of specifications for what the house should contain. The winners of the contest was found and construction began shortly after. The project was financed by municipalities around Aarhus and Århus County which also funded operation of it. In 1906 the building was finished. In the 1930s space was running out again; the city continued to grow and more institutions were established in the building. In 1937 a new law made it mandatory for municipalities to make rooms available for the Ministry of Justice free of charge. The change meant it was no longer necessary for the city of Aarhus to fund the courthouse and in 1940 it was sold to the Danish state.

== Architecture ==
The building was situated some 10 meters away from the street so the facade lined up with a building in Christiansgade. It was the architect Hack Kampmann who selected the placement on the property. The courthouse was constructed in 3 wings with 3 floors of red brick. The base is clad in grey granite and the main staircase is also made of granite. The windows in the two bottom floors have rounded arches while on the 3rd floor they are square. The large hip roof was covered with black, glazed brick. The artist Karl Hansen Reistrup, who also designed the interior of Aarhus Theatre, designed the most important decorative features of the building including two bronze lions placed at the corners of the side-wings and two bronze lanterns which are copies of lamps from Palazzo Strozzi in Florence from 1500. The Coat of Arms which adorns the front of the building was made by sculptor Elias Ølsgaards. The jailhouse behind the court building was constructed in 4 floors with a large arched window in the north-eastern gable facing Emanuel Sejrs Gade.

== See also ==
- Architecture of Aarhus
