= Thomas Rørdam =

His Excellency Thomas Rørdam S.K.

President of The Supreme Court of Denmark
- In office 1 February 2017 – 31 October 2022
- Preceded by: Poul Søgaard
- Succeeded by: Jens Peter Christensen

Personal details
- Born: 17 October 1952 (age 73) Gladsaxe, Hovedstaden, Denmark
- Education: University of California, Berkeley

Thomas Rørdam S.K. (born 17 October 1952) is a Danish lawyer and former President of the Supreme Court of Denmark.

Before becoming a Supreme Court Judge in 2002, Rørdam was a notable defence lawyer. As a criminal defence lawyer he became known for a number of criminal cases, which was widely televised and received great public and media attention, including the case against the Blekingegade Gang, the Vadstrupgård case and the Plejebo case, and thus becoming probably one of the best known lawyers in recent Danish history.

Rørdam is also Editor-in-chief of Karnov's Law Collection.

== Education and career ==
Born on 17 October 1952 in Gladsaxe, he is the son of former High Court judge in the High Court of Western Denmark, Peter Rørdam and his wife Karin Rosa Blasberg.

Thomas Rørdam became cand.jur. in 1976 and subsequently attended the University of California (Berkeley) until 1977. He was then a principal at the Ministry of Justice from 1977 to 1985, with secondment as assistant police prosecutor in Ringsted 1980–82, and partly as an assistant to the Public Prosecutor's Office for Zealand. From 1985 to 2002 he was an independent lawyer and co-owner of the Law firm Nyborg & Rørdam.

Thomas Rørdam was adjunct teacher (most recently adjunct associate professor) at the University of Copenhagen in personal, family and succession law (1978–1979), property law (1980–1992) and criminal law (1994–1996 and again from 2004). Rørdam has also taught attorneys and Judges, among others, on subjects such as human rights (from 1993), criminal procedure (from 1996), forensic psychiatry (1998) and floating company charge (2005).

=== Supreme Court Judge and President ===
In 2002, Thomas Rørdam went from a very public role as a top-lawyer and avid participant in the public debate on legal policy issues to a less visible role as a Judge of the Supreme Court. In February 2017, Rørdam replaced Poul Søgaard as President of the Supreme Court.

As President of the Supreme Court, Rørdam served as chairman of the impeachment trial that sentenced former Minister for Integration, Inger Støjberg to 60 days in jail.

He was succeeded as president on 1 November 2022 by Jens Peter Christensen.

=== Other positions and professional affiliations ===
Thomas Rørdam is a diligent member of the legal councils and committees of legal proceedings in Denmark. List:

- Member of the General Council of the Danish Bar and Law Society from 1991 to 1997, as well as member and chairman of several committees under the council.
- Member of the Board of the National Association of Appointed Defence Attorneys in 1993 and chairman of the Association from 1997 to 2002.
- Chairman of the Danish chapter of the International Commission of Jurists (ICJ) from 2002 to 2004.
- Member of the Greenland Judiciary Commission 1995–2002
- Member of the Committee on The Question of Police and Defence Intelligence Services 1998–2002
- Member of the Ministry of Justice sub-commission on the conduct of criminal proceedings on child sexual abuse 2000–2002
- Chairman of the board of Kong Christian den Tiendes Fond 2017–
- Board member of Thorvaldsens Museum 2017–
- Board member of Illum Fondet 2017–
- Chairman of the Standing Committee on Criminal Law 2019–

== Writings and publications ==
Thomas Rørdam has written the book "Forsvareren" (a handbook for the counsel for the defence), and he is the co-author of two books on property law issues and have also written numerous articles for professional journals on aspects of property law and criminal procedure in particular. Since 2003, Thomas Rørdam is also one of the three chief editors of Karnov's Law Collection (annotated body of laws).

== Style and decorations ==
The President of the Supreme Court of Denmark is a member of the first class of precedence of the Kingdom of Denmark, and as such entitled to the style of "His Excellency". Thomas Rørdam received on 16. April 2017 the decoration of Grand Cross of the Order of the Dannebrog.
