= 1727 in Denmark =

- Decades: 1700s; 1710s; 1720s; 1730s; 1740s
- See also: Other events of 1727; List of years in Denmark

Events from the year 1727 in Denmark.

== Incumbents ==
- Monarch – Frederick IV
- Grand Chancellor – Ulrik Adolf Holstein

== Events ==
- April – Denmark signs the Treaty of Copenhagen, leading to Denmark-Norway de facto joining the Hanoverian Alliance.

=== Undated ===
- Foundation of the Det Kongelige Vajsenhus.

== Births ==
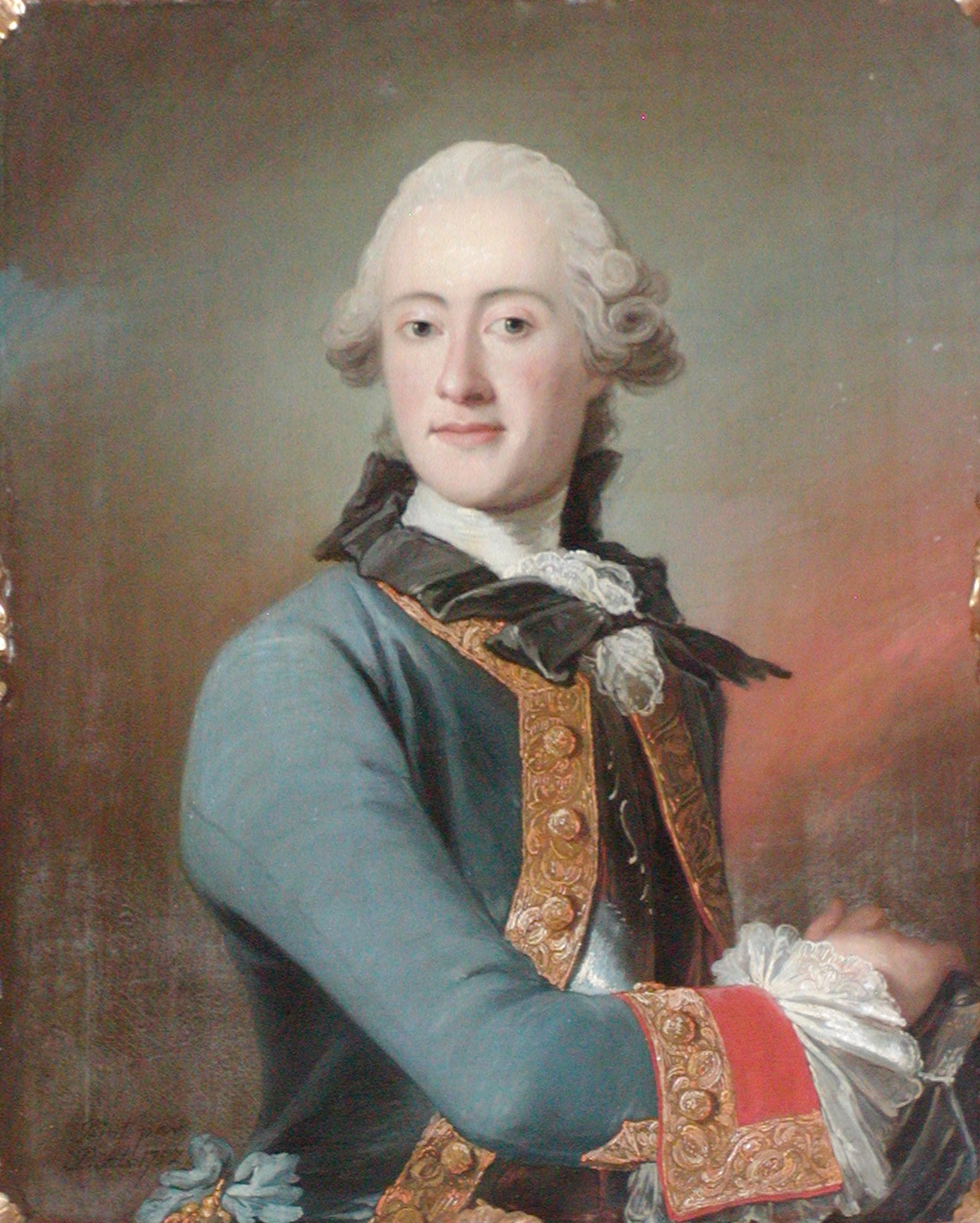
Frederik Christian Kaas.

- 2 July – Abraham Markoe, businessman, landowner and planter (died 1806)
- 23 October – Stephan Hofgaard Cordsen, Supreme Court justice (died 1800)
- 1 December – Frederik Christian Kaas, Admiral, landowner (died 1804)
