= Jens Peter Christensen =

Danish Supreme Court president (born 1956)

President of the Supreme Court of Denmark
- Incumbent
- Assumed office 1 November 2022
- Preceded by: Thomas Rørdam

Judge of the Supreme Court of Denmark
- Incumbent
- Assumed office 2006

President of the Danish Court Administration

President of the Danish Electoral Commission

Personal details
- Born: 1 November 1956 (age 69) Skive, Denmark
- Education: Candidate of Philosophy (1980); Candidate of Political Science (1982); Licentiate of Law (1990); Candidate of Law (1992); Doctor of Law (1997)
- Alma mater: Aarhus University
- Occupation: Judge, jurist, academic

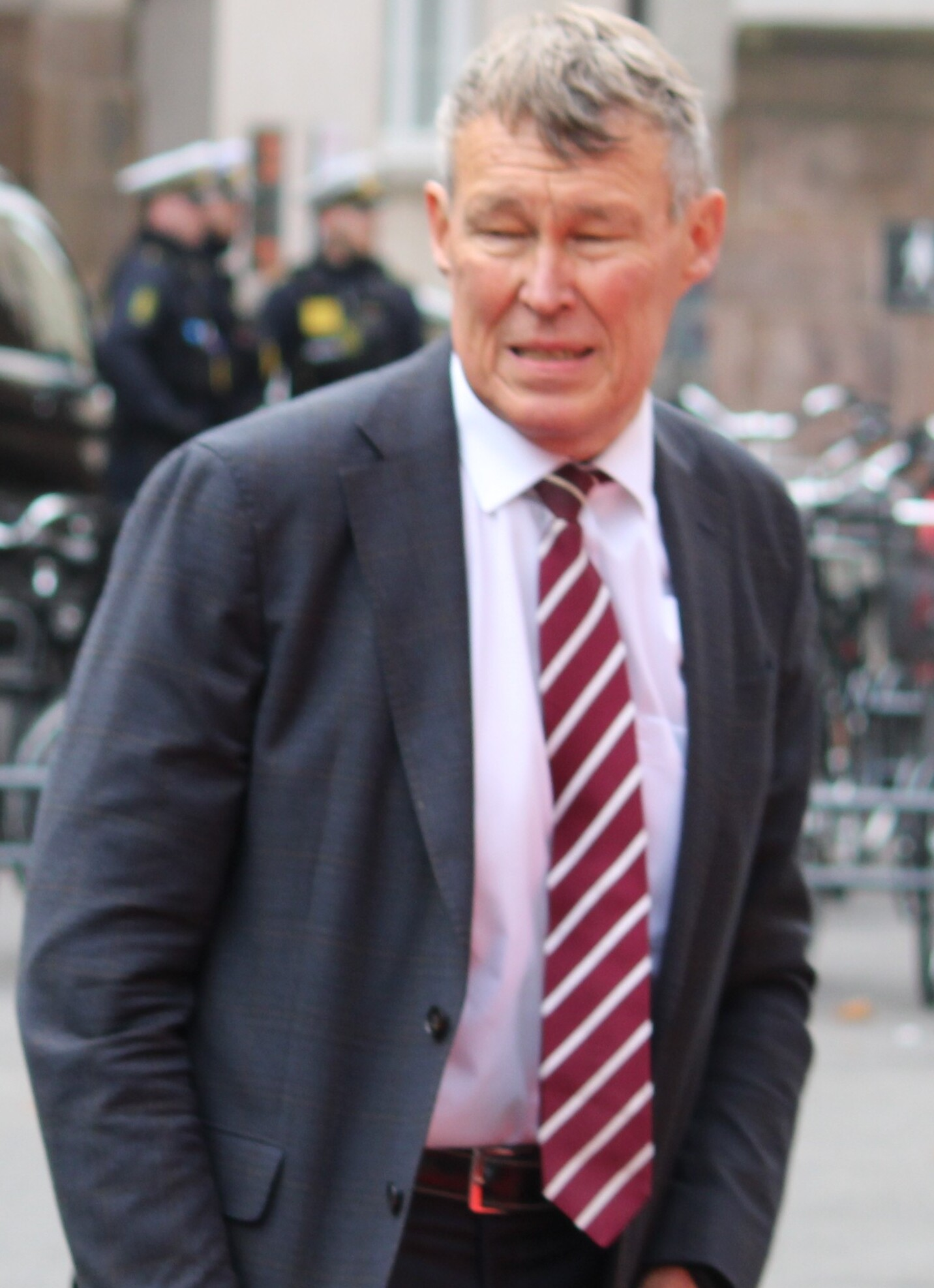
Christensen in 2025

Jens Peter Christensen (born 1 November 1956 in Skive) is the president of the Supreme Court of Denmark.

He finished his upper secondary level education in 1975, became a Candidate of Philosophy in 1980, Candidate of Political Science in 1982, Licentiate of Law in 1990, Candidate of Law in 1992 and a Doctor of Law in 1997.

Christensen was a fuldmægtig at the Copenhagen Municipality from 1983 to 1984, fuldmægtig at the Danish Ministry of Education from 1985 to 1988, a research fellow at the Aarhus University judicial institute from 1988 to 1990, public law lecturer from 1990 to 1998 and acting judge at the High Court of Western Denmark from 1999 to 2000. In 2006 he was appointed to be a judge at the Supreme Court of Denmark. He is the president of the Danish Court Administration and the Danish Electoral Commission.

Christensen was appointed President of the Supreme Court, effective from 1 November 2022, succeeding Thomas Rørdam.
