= Mourier =

Mourier is a French surname. Notable people with the surname include:

- Charles Ferdinand Léonard Mourier (1800–1880), Danish Supreme Court justice
- Christian Mourier-Petersen (1858–1945), Danish painter
- Édith Mourier (1920–2017), French mathematician
- Léopold Mourier (1862–1923), French chef, restaurateur, gastronome, and philanthropist
- Patrice Mourier (born 1962), French Olympic wrestler
- Pierre Paul Ferdinand Mourier (1746–1836), Danish Asiatic Company trader of French descent

== See also ==
- Henning Mourier Lemche (1904–1977), Danish zoologist
