= Danish Council =

Danish Council may refer to:

- Danish Council of State, the Privy Council of Denmark
- Danish Press Council, a Danish independent public tribunal press council under the Ministry of Justice
- Danish Refugee Council, a private Danish humanitarian organisation
