= Karnovs Lovsamling =

Compilation of all significant laws of Denmark

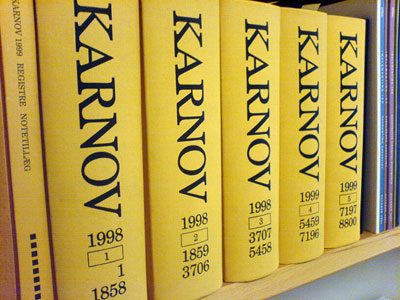
Karnovs Lovsamling for 1998/1999 on a bookshelf

Karnovs Lovsamling (Karnov's Law Collection, often referred to as Karnov) is a compilation that contains all significant laws of Denmark. The laws are commented on with interpretations, rulings, administrative decisions and references to literature. In addition, the compilation is updated following legislative changes, so the work the current laws with changes in a single version.

== History ==
Karnovs Lovsamling was first produced in 1924, under the title Hvermands Lovbog (Everybody's Laws), by district court prosecutor Magnus Karnov (1882-1962), from Sønderborg. It contained the most common Danish laws, and the motive for the release was the Southern Jutland reunion with Denmark. While the country had been under German rule, German law had been applied, but after the reunification, Danish law was introduced gradually. The lack of a comprehensive law such as the German Bürgerliches Gesetzbuch inspired Karnov to create his own collection. Commentary was added later, and the concept was also expanded to Norway and Sweden.

Although the book edition in the characteristic pale yellow color with the inscription "KARNOV" on the back is the classic symbol of a lawyer, it is currently overtaken by the online edition, which is updated on a regular basis. The physical law collection is published today in a smaller edition and is a digest of 4-5 volumes. The law collection is published annually and updated ten times annually, with lesser books (Karnov's Yellow Booklets). As of 2018, Karnov is published by Karnov Group (formerly Thomson Reuters Professional).

== Construction ==
The law collection is organized in 23 different subjects, such as state and administrative law, health laws or finance. Each topic is again divided into subtopics. In addition to the purely systematic structure, Karnov is also equipped with a number of registers or indexes, to enable relevant provisions to be found in several ways.

The online version has different search and storage options and integration with other electronic products from the same publishing house - especially the Ugeskrift for Retsvæsen. There are also a number of additional modules for Karnov providing the ability to find the laws, histories and old legislative versions, announcements, circulars and guides.

The law has been commented using a very comprehensive notary. Each law begins with the law's history and relevant sources. Each provision of the law is provided with notes as needed. Some provisions are not commented at all, some have a single note and some provisions have note references for almost every word. The notes contain comments on the provision or the part of the provision to which it refers. The comments consist partly of actual interpretations or interpretations, partly by references to and summaries of judgments and other practices, and partly by references to other rules and in-depth literature. The notes are far more extensive than the statutes themselves.

Smaller special versions have also been made for special subjects, the largest special edition of which is EU Karnov. In addition, there are also Property Karnov, Company Karnov and Health Karnov, where the relevant laws are selected and collected (with comments) in a single volume.

The academic content is handled by an editorial staff. As of 2018, the editorial board was composed of Doctor of Jurisprudence Bo von Eyben of the University of Copenhagen, Dr. Jan Pedersen of Aarhus University, and Supreme Court Judge Thomas Rørdam. In addition, there is a broader editorial and a wide range of specialists who write and edit the content in the comment section. Over time, some of the country's top lawyers have been in the main editorial staff.

== Literature ==
- Axel Andersen, Danish reference books, Chapters 10-18, Gad, 1977. (The Danish School of Libraries, 4). ISBN 87-12-16629-4.
