= Claus Bjørn =

Danish historian

- Born: 7 October 1944; Frederiksberg, Copenhagen, German occupied Denmark)
- Died: 18 April 2005 (aged 60); Hørsholm, Denmark
- Occupations: Historian; Author; Biographer; Broadcaster

Academic background
- Education: University of Copenhagen

Claus Ebbe Bjørn (7 October 1944 – 18 April 2005) was a Danish author, historian, and television and radio broadcaster, who was Associate Professor of Agricultural History at the University of Copenhagen, Chairman of the Danish Agricultural History Society and Member of the Royal Danish Society of the History of the Fatherland.

== Life ==
Bjørn was born in Frederiksberg, Copenhagen, Denmark, in 1944. He became mag.art. in History from the University of Copenhagen in 1970 and was employed as a part-time teacher at Rødovre State School (1965–71). On 1 September 1971, he was employed as an amanuensis, and later as Associate professor of Agricultural History in the Department of History at the University of Copenhagen. From 1983 to 1995, he was Chairman of the Danish Agricultural History Society (Landbohistorisk Selskab). He edited the magazine da:Fortid og Nutid (Past and Present) (1975–85) and the multi-volume work, The History of Danish Agriculture (Det Danske landbrugs historie), I–IV (1988–89), where he himself treated the period from 1810 to 1860.

Bjørn was Treasurer of the Danish Agricultural History Society (Landbohistorisk Selskab), (1973–77), vice-chairman (1977–83), and chairman (1983–95). He was also a Member of the Board of the Danish Joint Historical Council (Dansk Historisk Fællesforening) from 1974 to 1987, and deputy chairman of the Agricultural Historical Support Circle (Landbohistorisk Støttekreds) from 1983 to 1995. He was elected a Member of Member of the Royal Danish Society of the History of the Fatherland (Det kongelige danske Selskab for Fædrelandets Historie) in 1989.

His most important research was in the field of agricultural history in relation to Denmark's political history in the 19th century. He also published a number of biographies, including those of the social democratic Prime Minister, H. C. Hansen, the Chief Justice Christian Colbjørnsen, and the statesman Christian D. F. Reventlow. In his later years, he became more widely known to the public for commentating on television and radio including for royal events such as the funeral of Queen Ingrid of Denmark in 2000 and the Wedding of Crown Prince Frederik of Denmark in 2004. He died in Hørsholm, Denmark, in 2005.

== Publications ==
- Bjørn, C. (1979), "The Jutland Proprietary Feud (Den jyske proprietærfejde)", History / Jutland Collections, New Series, 13 PDF
- Bjørn, C. (1981). Peasant, Gentleman, King: The Farmer in 18th century Denmark (Bonde Herremand Konge. Bonden i 1700–tallets Danmark). Copenhagen: Saga. ISBN 9788726101386.
- Bjørn, C. (1982). The Danish Dairy Industry, 1882–2000 (Dansk Mejeribrug 1882–2000). Copenhagen: Lindhardt og Ringhof. ISBN 9788711973158.
- Bjørn, C. (1985). The Fear of 1848 (Frygten fra 1848. Bonde- og husmandsuroen på Sjælland i foråret 1848. Copenhagen: Lindhardt og Ringhof. ISBN 9788726101362.
- Bjørn, C., ed. (1988). The History of Danish Agriculture: I: Antiquity and the Middle Ages (Det Danske landbrugs historie. Bind I: Oldtid og middelalder). Copenhagen: Landbohistorisk Selskab.
- Bjørn, C., ed. (1988). The History of Danish Agriculture: II: 1536–1810 (Det Danske landbrugs historie. Bind II: 1536–1810). Copenhagen: Landbohistorisk Selskab.
- Bjørn, C., ed. (1988). The History of Danish Agriculture: III: 1810–1914 (Det Danske landbrugs historie. Bind III: 1810–1914). Copenhagen: Landbohistorisk Selskab.
- Bjørn, C., ed. (1988). The History of Danish Agriculture: IV: 1914–1988 (Det Danske landbrugs historie. Bind IV: 1914–1988). Copenhagen: Landbohistorisk Selskab.
- Bjørn, C. (1990). From Reaction to the Constitution – 1800–1850 (Fra reaktion til grundlov – 1800–1850). Gyldendal and Politikens Danmarkshistorie (Gyldendal and the History of Danish Politics), volume 10. Copenhagen: Lindhardt og Ringhof. ISBN 9788789068312.
- Bjørn, C. (1992). The Good Cause: A Biography of Christian Ditlev Frederik Reventlow (Den gode sag. En biografi af Chr. D. F. Reventlow). Copenhagen: Lindhardt og Ringhof. ISBN 9788711973202.
- Bjørn, C. (1993). Anders Nielsen Svejstrup Østergaard. Copenhagen: Lindhardt og Ringhof. ISBN 9788726101348.
- Bjørn, C.; Grant, Alexander; Stringer, Keith J., eds. (1994). Social and Political Identities in Western History. Copenhagen: Academic Press. ISBN 978-8750031987.
- Bjørn, C.; Grant, Alexander; Stringer, Keith J., eds. (1994). Nations, Nationalism, and Patriotism in the European Past. Copenhagen: Academic Press. ISBN 9788750031963.
- Bjørn, C. (1995). The Laws are given force: A Biography of Christian Colbiørnsen (Lovene gives kraft. En biografi af Chr. Colbiørnsen). Copenhagen: Lindhardt og Ringhof. ISBN 9788726101331.
- Bjørn, C. (1998). 1848 – Civil War and Revolution (1848 – Borgerkrig og revolution). Copenhagen: Lindhardt og Ringhof. ISBN 978-8726101324.
- Bjørn, C. (1998). When Denmark Became Modern or The Story of the Real Danish Utopia (Dengang Danmark blev moderne. eller Historien om den virkelige danske utopi). Copenhagen: Fremad. ISBN 9788755719996.
- Bjørn, C. (1999). The Struggle for the Constitution (Kampen om grundloven). Copenhagen: Fremad. ISBN 9788755722200.
- Bjørn, C. (1999). Knuthenborg Park: Denmark's Largest Manor Park and its Creators (Knuthenborg Park. Danmarks største herregårdspark og dens skabere). Copenhagen: Knuthenborg Park.
- Bjørn, C.; Fonnesbech-Wulff, Benedicte, eds. (2000). Field and Man: Studies in the History of Denmark, 1500– 1800: Dedicated to Karl-Erik Frandsen (Mark og menneske: studier i Danmarks historie 1500– 1800: tilegnet Karl-Erik Frandsen). Ebeltoft: Skippershoved. ISBN 9788789224589.
- Bjørn, C. (2001). Just for Decoration? The Monarchy Yesterday, Today and Tomorrow (Blot til pynt? Monarkiet i går, i dag og i morgen). Copenhagen: Lindhardt og Ringhof. ISBN 9788726162806.
- Sevaldsen, Jørgen; Bjørke, Bo; Bjørn, C., eds. (2003). Britain and Denmark: Political, Economic, and Cultural Relations in the 19th and 20th Centuries. Copenhagen: Museum Tusculanum Press. ISBN 9788772897509.
- Bjørn, C.; Due-Nielsen, Carsten [in Danish], eds. (2003). From Whole State to Nation State, 1814–1914 (Fra helstat til nationalstat, 1814–1914). History of Danish Foreign Policy (Dansk udenrigspolitiks historie), volume 3, The Great Danish Encyclopaedia (Danmarks Nationalleksikon). Copenhagen. ISBN 9788777891014.
- Bjørn, C. (2004). H. C. Hansen: A Biography (H.C. Hansen. En biografi). Copenhagen: Fremad. ISBN 9788755724211.
- Bjørn, C. (2005). The Strategic Environmental Research Programme, 1992–2004 (Det strategiske miljøforskningsprogram 1992–2004). Aarhus: Aarhus University Press. ISBN 9788779341531.
