= Judiciary of Greenland =

Judicial branch of Greenland

The Judiciary of Greenland consists of 4 district courts (Greenlandic: Eqqartuussisoqarfik, Danish: Kredsret), the Court of Greenland (Greenlandic: Kalaallit Nunaanni Eqqartuussivik, Danish: Retten i Grønland), and the High Court of Greenland (Greenlandic: Kalaallit Nunaanni Eqqartuussisuuneqarfik, Danish: Grønlands Landsret).

Most cases are heard in the first instance by the district courts. District court judges are not lawyers, but lay judges with a special education and thorough knowledge of Greenlandic society. The Court of Greenland processes legally complicated cases in the first instance, and handles the supervision and education of district judges. Judges in the Court of Greenland and the High Court of Greenland are lawyers.

Rulings issued by the district courts and the Court of Greenland may be appealed before the High Court of Greenland. Rulings issued by the High Court of Greenland may, with the permission of the Appeals Permission Board, be brought before the Supreme Court (Greenlandic: Eqqartuussiviit Qullersaat, Danish: Højesteret) in Copenhagen.

== Links ==
- Judiciary of Greenland (in Danish)
