= Maritime and Commercial Court (Denmark) =

Danish specialized court

Maritime and Commercial Court (Danish: Sø- og Handelsretten) is a specialized Danish court with jurisdiction over cases involving commercial law and maritime law. It was founded in 1861. It has a civil division, focusing on business cases, and a bankruptcy division.
