= Courts of Denmark =

System of judiciary and courts in Kingdom of Denmark

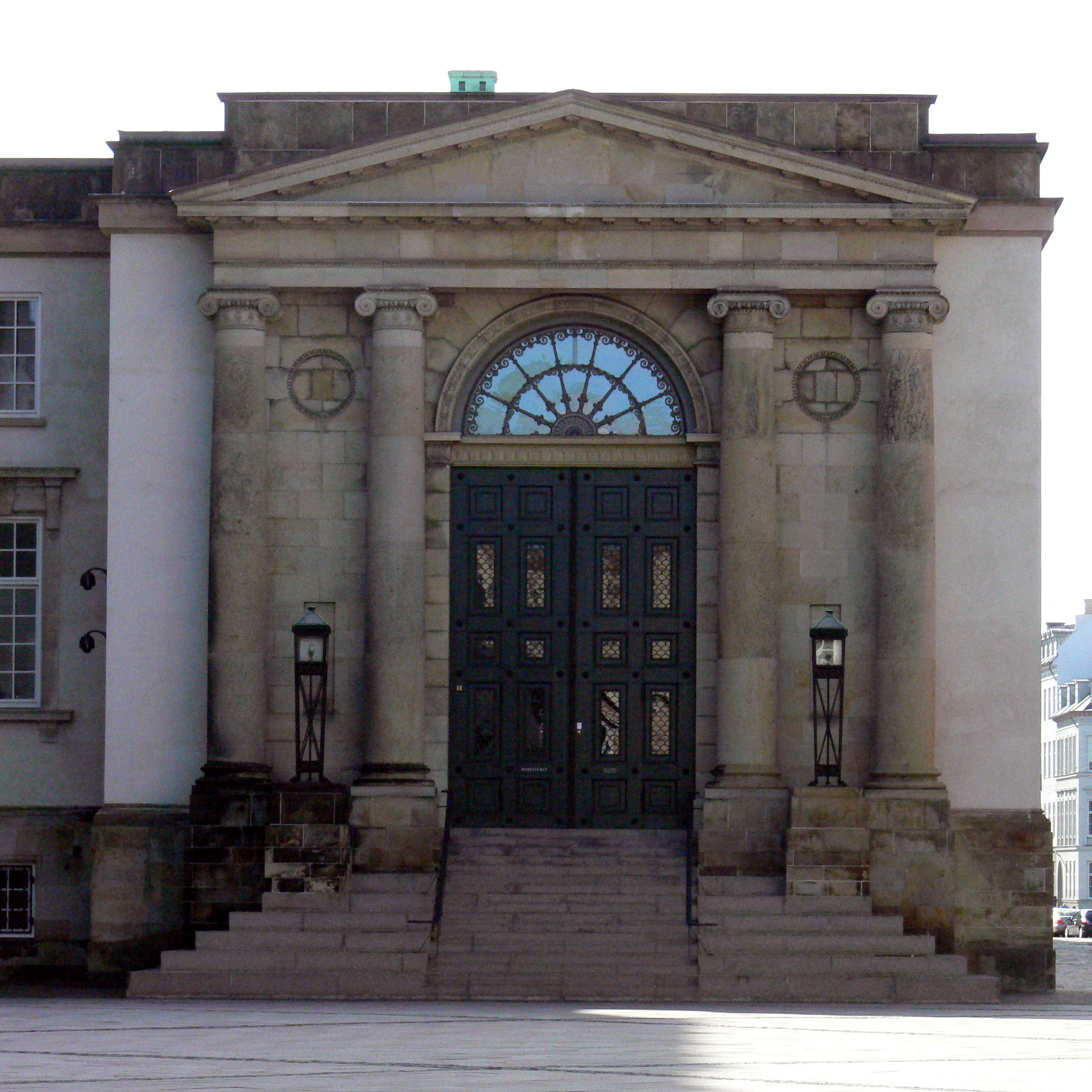
Entrance to the Danish Supreme Court, located in Christiansborg Palace in Copenhagen.

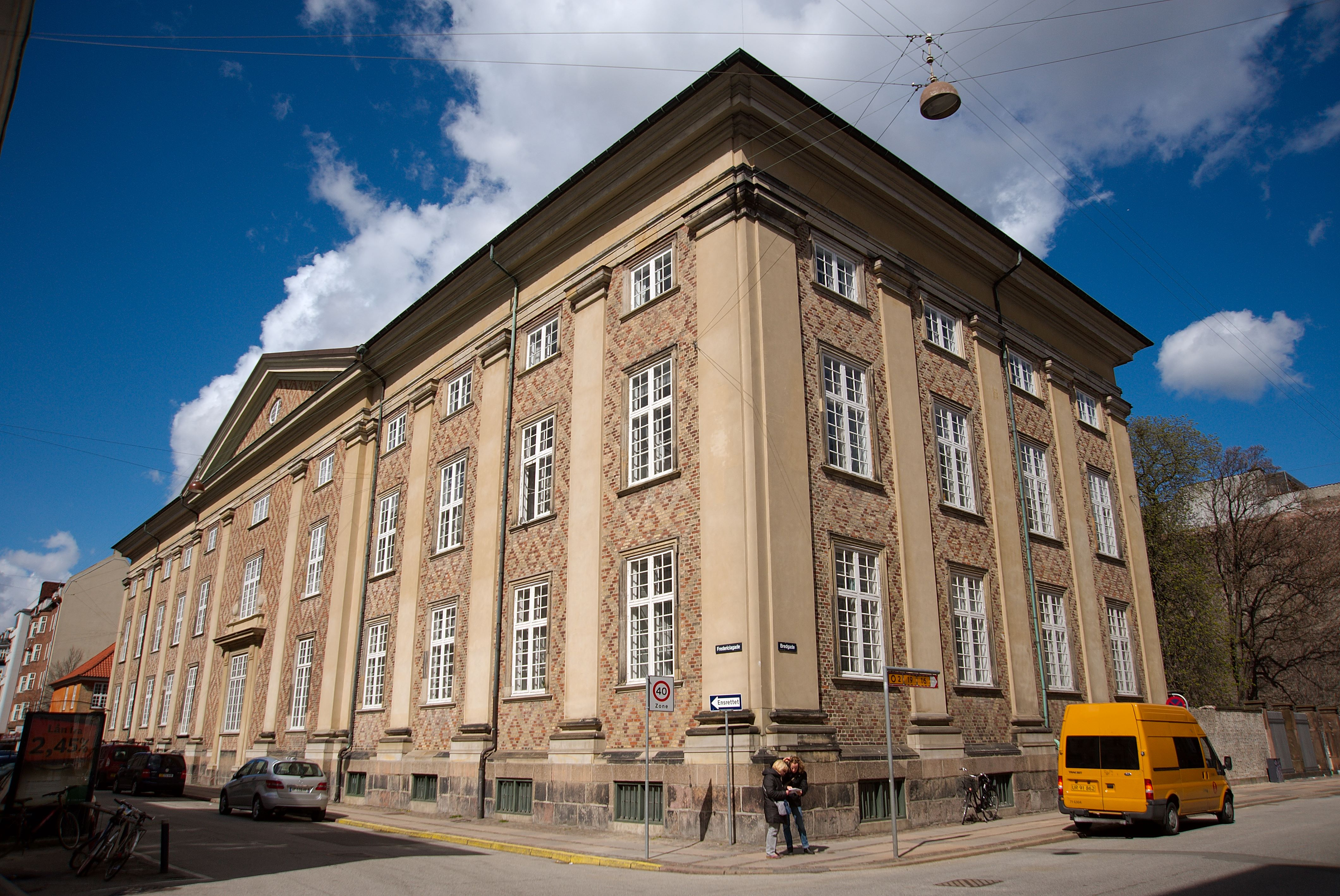
The Eastern High Court in Copenhagen, Zealand

The Courts of Denmark (Danish: Danmarks Domstole, Faroese: Danmarks Dómstólar, Greenlandic: Danmarkimi Eqqartuussiviit) constitute the ordinary court system of the Kingdom of Denmark. The Courts of Denmark as an organizational entity was created with the Police and Judiciary Reform Act (Politi- og Domstolsreformen) taking effect 1 January 2007 which also significantly reformed the court system e.g. by removing original jurisdiction from the High Courts and by introducing a new jury system.

The Courts of Denmark are composed of the ordinary courts consisting of the Supreme Court (Højesteret), the three high courts: the Western High Court (Vestre Landsret) the Eastern High Court (Østre Landsret), the High Court of Greenland (Greenlandic: Kalaallit Nunaanni Eqqartuussisuuneqarfik, Danish: Grønlands Landsret), the Maritime and Commercial Court (Sø- og Handelsretten), the Court of Judicial Registration (Tinglysningsretten), the Special Court of Indictment and Revision (Den Særlige Klageret), the 24 district courts, the Court of the Faroe Islands, The Court in Greenland and the four Greenlandic Circuit Courts. Part of the Courts of Denmark are also three boards: the Appeals Permission Board (Processbevillingsnævnet), the Sideline Employment Board and the Judicial Appointment Council. Finally the Danish Court Administration is vested with the joint administration of the whole organization.

The courts of Greenland and the Faroe Islands constitute semi-autonomous parts of the Courts of Denmark and are governed by separate but largely similar procedural codes.

Outside the ordinary court system and the joint administration framework of the Courts of Denmark, a separate collective labour dispute court system exists and a number of quasi-judicial bodies exist, some of which are exempt from judicial oversight.

== The Courts of Justice ==
In accordance with Article 3 of the Danish Constitution, all judicial authority is vested in the courts of justice. The constitution also provides that only judges of the court may pass judgements, whereas parliamentary commissions may only investigate.

The Danish system of courts is based on a unified structure, in which there are no special or constitutional courts of law, as well as no formal division within the courts. As a rule, all courts of law may adjudicate disputes in legal areas such as civil, labour, administrative, and constitutional law, as well as criminal justice.

Judicial action against ministers and/or former ministers, in cases surrounding their dealings as minister, are however handled by a Court of Impeachment of the Realm (Rigsretten), composed of Supreme Court judges and members of parliament.

The Court of Indictment and Revision (Den Særlige Klageret) handles complaints regarding procedure, disqualification of judges, etc. brought by the users of the courts, against the courts.

Proceedings are oral in general and open to the public in the lower courts, and always oral in the Supreme Court. Media transmissions from within the court are prohibited, unless allowed by the presiding judge.

The general structure of the judicial system is inspired by the traditions of continental Europe.

The Administration of Justice Act of 1916 (Lov om Rettens Pleje – Retsplejeloven), the only Danish legal code, contains almost 1,000 articles, defining the administration and organisation of the courts, covering fields of both civil and criminal procedure. The Act has undergone substantial changes since its enactment in 1916.

== Structure ==

From 1 January 2007, the Danish courts are composed of the Supreme Court (Højesteret), the two high courts (Landsretten), the Copenhagen Maritime and Commercial Court (Sø- og Handelsretten i København (national jurisdiction)), the Land Registration Court, 24 district courts (Byretten), the courts of the Faroe Islands and Greenland, the Appeals Permission Board, the Danish Judicial Appointments Council, and the Danish Court Administration.

Furthermore, the Danish Constitution provides for the Court of Impeachment of the Realm (Rigsretten) to hear cases brought against ministers concerning their administration. In addition, the Special Court of Final Appeal (Den særlige Klageret) deals with cases concerning disciplinary sanctions against judges and petitions for retrial of criminal cases under Article 86 of the Administration of Justice Act.

The Danish courts exercise the judicial powers of government and resolve related issues, including probate, bankruptcy, enforcement, land registration, and administrative issues.

All judges are jurists. Lay judges may be of any profession, except they may not be attorneys, members of the clergy, or acting civil servants, and it is considered of good practice for none to be jurists.

=== Reform ===
A gradual reform of the lower courts, which began in late 2005, was a significant overhaul of the Danish judicial system. This reform, known as the Police and Judiciary Reform Act, took full effect on January 1, 2007, and introduced several key changes to the structure and functioning of the courts.

- The number of district courts was reduced from 82 to 24, creating larger courts covering wider geographical areas and serving a greater population base.
- Nearly all cases, both civil and criminal, are now tried by district courts as the court of first instance. This change removed original jurisdiction from the High Courts.
- Civil cases in district courts may now be tried by a panel of judges or by a judge assisted by experts, providing more flexibility in case management.
- The reform introduced a new jury system for criminal cases in district courts.
- More flexible rules of procedure were implemented for civil cases, allowing for more efficient management of the preparatory phase.
- A simplified procedure was introduced for civil small-claims cases involving amounts less than DKK 50,000.

=== County courts and the role of county court judges ===
The composition of the county courts varies but is regulated by law. The Copenhagen County Court has 49 judges and a president, whilst Aarhus, Odense, Aalborg, and Roskilde county courts have a president and fifteen, ten, ten, and seven other judges, respectively. 29 jurisdictions have two to four judges, whilst the last 50 jurisdictions have only one judge.

At the preparatory and trial stages of civil cases only one judge presides. In criminal cases where the defendant pleads guilty to all charges presented against him or her, or when the prosecution does not ask for a sentence in excess of a fine, the case is also presided by a single judge. In criminal cases where this is not the case, the judge sits with two lay judges. Special rules regarding appointment of lay judges apply to maritime cases.

In cases where lay judges sit with the judge, decisions are adopted by simple majority.

In addition to their normal duties, county court judges act as notary public and bailiffs (in particular, the fogedret sees to the enforcement of judgments and legal claims), as well as administrators of bankruptcy proceedings and probate matters. Furthermore, they administer the local land registry. In regard to the administrative tasks, these functions may be assigned to an assessor, which is a deputy judge. An electronic reform of the land registry system is being implemented, making the system entirely electronic.

All nuptial agreements and the car-ownership registry are controlled and administered by Aarhus County Court.

=== High courts ===
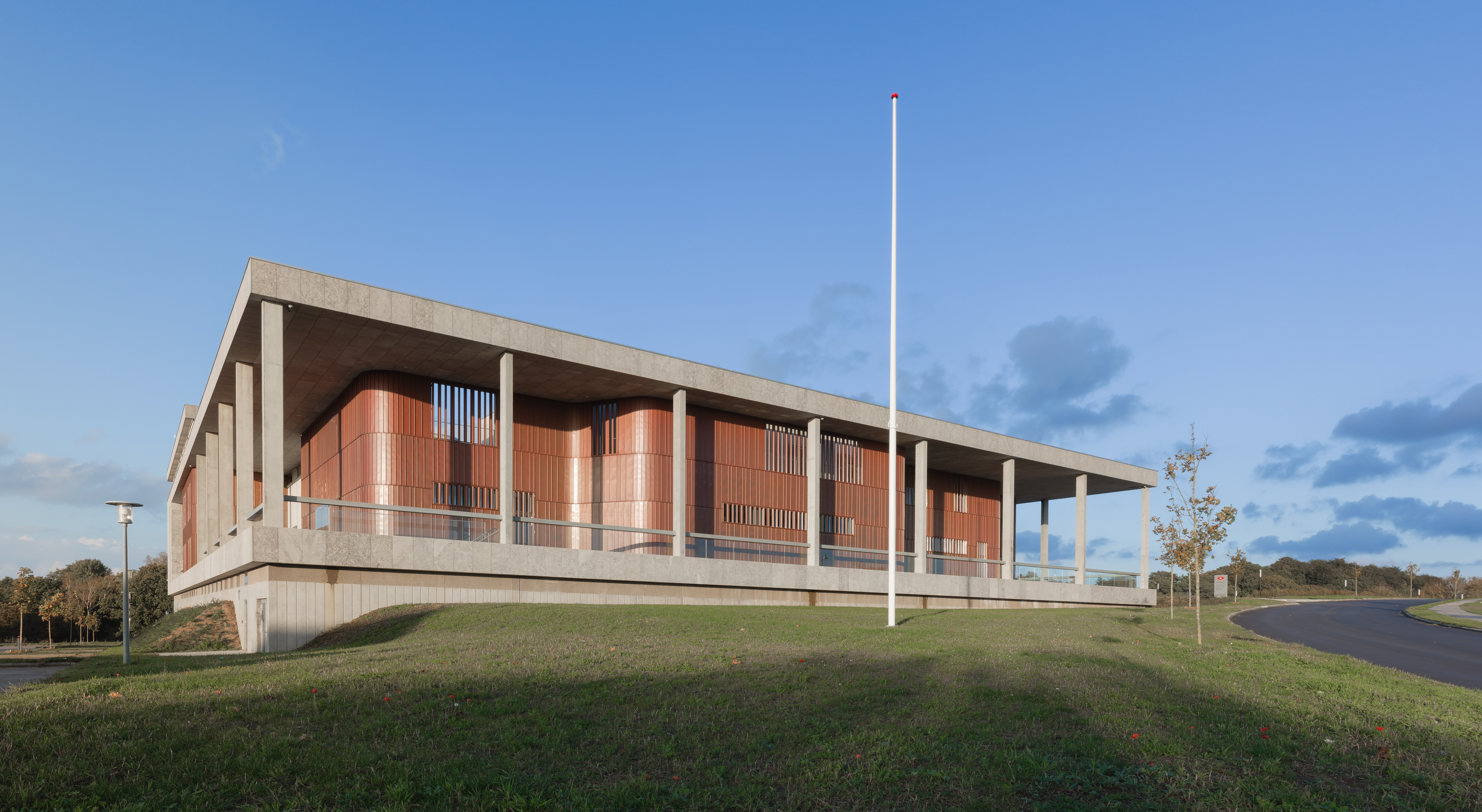
The Western High Court in Viborg, Jutland

The high courts function as appellate courts for cases from the subordinate courts. A county court decision can be appealed to a high court if the disputed claim exceeds DKK 20,000. If the matter has an economic value of less than DKK 20,000 an appeal require permission from the Procesbevillingsnævnet. A high court may dismiss an appeal if the appealed case does not relate to a question of principle or if for other reasons the High Court deems that the appeal should not be brought for a high court.

Denmark has three high courts. The High Court of Western Denmark (Vestre Landsret) sits in Viborg but has chambers in larger western cities. It has jurisdiction over all county courts in Jutland. It has one President and 38 judges. The High Court of Eastern Denmark (Østre Landsret) sits in Copenhagen but has chambers in larger eastern cities. It has jurisdiction over all county courts outside the Jutland peninsula, as well as the County Court for the Faroe Islands. It has one president and 63 judges. The high courts are only set in chambers outside Viborg and Copenhagen in criminal cases. All civil cases are brought before the high courts in either Viborg or Copenhagen.

The High Court of Greenland (Greenlandic: Kalaallit Nunaanni Eqqartuussisuuneqarfik, Danish: Grønlands Landsret) sitting in Nuuk has appellate jurisdiction over the inferior courts of Greenland consisting of the four circuit courts and the Court in Greenland. It consists of a single judge, the High Court Judge in Greenland (Greenlandic: Kalaallit Nunaanni Eqqartuussisuuneq, Danish: Landsdommeren i Grønland) but is joined by two high court judges from the other high courts in cases appealed from Court in Greenland.

The high courts are split into chambers, each consisting of three high court judges (landsdommere), one of which may be a high court judge pro tempore (konstitueret landsdommer). Every case is assigned a chamber and a panel of three judges is constituted to hear the case, usually composed of the three judges of the chamber but it may also be composed of judges across the chambers or of more than three judges. Though the President of the High Court appoints a presiding judge for each chamber, all decisions are reached by a simple majority except in jury trials where a qualified majority is necessary for a guilty verdict.

As a criminal appellate court in appealed cases where lay judges have taken part in the county court trial, the high court is composed of three high court judges and three lay judges. In cases where special knowledge is needed, i.e. cases regarding removal of children from their parents, specialists may appear as judges. In jury trials appealed to the high court the court is composed of three judges and nine jurors.

=== Supreme Court ===
The Supreme Court functions as a civil and criminal appellate court for cases from the subordinate courts. Since a decision cannot normally be appealed more than once, county court cases rarely reach Supreme Court-level, though this may be the case if the independent Board of Appeals grants a leave of appeal.

The Supreme Court was founded on 14 February 1661 by King Frederik III, yet can trace its roots back even further to the now-defunct King's Court of King Christian IV (Kongens Retterting). As its name indicates, the Supreme Court is the highest court in the Kingdom of Denmark and its judgments cannot be appealed to another Danish court. It is split into two chambers which both hear all types of cases. A case is heard by at least five judges. In all, the court consists of normally fifteen judges and a president.

Unlike criminal cases in the lower courts, the Supreme Court does not deal with the issue of guilt. However, the basis on which the lower court reached its verdict may be brought into consideration and edited. In criminal trials by jury in the first instance, the defence may appeal on grounds of judicial error regarding the judges' direction to the jury (the summing-up of the theoretical foundations, which should be taken into consideration when the jurors deliberate).

== Independent administration ==
Articles 62 and 64 of the Danish Constitution ensure judicial independence from the government and Parliament by providing that judges shall only be guided by the law, including acts, statutes, and practice.

=== Administration of the courts ===
With more than 2,600 employees (including approximately 1,850 clerks), the Danish Court Administration was formed on 1 July 1999 following the Court Administration Act, 1998. As a result, the responsibility of administering the justice system and courts was removed from the Ministry of Justice and given to a newly formed, independent Court Administration (Domstolsstyrelsen), thereby securing separation of the judicial and executive branches of government.

=== Appointment of judges ===
As of 2011, there are approximately 380 judges. All judges except for the President of the Supreme Court are appointed by the reigning monarch, following recommendations (orders) from the Minister of Justice on the advice of the Judicial Appointments Council. To date, the advice of the council has always been followed.

The Judicial Appointments Council, like the Court Administration, was formed in 1999, and facilitates the recruitment of judges from all branches of the legal profession. Before 1999, it was felt that too many judges had a career background within the Ministry of Justice.

Likewise, the council was set up to ensure independence from the other branches of government. Even though it is funded via the annual Budget Act, the council enjoys full independence from all three branches of government.

=== Removal of judges ===
Article 64 of the Danish Constitution guarantees the personal independence of judges by protecting them from removal and transfer by the administration by vesting the power to remove judges in the courts themselves. Removal may only take place in instances of gross misconduct or lasting physical or psychological illnesses. Such dismissals are decided by The Special Court of Indictment and Revision, which consists of one judge each from the Supreme Court, a high court, and a county court. The verdict may be appealed to the Supreme Court.

== See also ==
- Legal systems of the world
