= Jakob Edvard Colbjørnsen =

Norwegian-Danish jurist (1744–1802)

Jakob Edvard Colbjørnsen (19 November 1744 - 13 February 1802) was a Norwegian-Danish jurist who served as Chief Justice of the Supreme Court of Denmark (Da. Højesteret, Nor. Høyesterett).

Jakob Edvard Colbjørnsen was born at Sørum in Akershus, Norway (during the time it was part of Denmark–Norway). He was raised in the traditional region of Romerike. His parents were Colbjørn Colbjørnsen Jacobsen (1714-1761) and Anna Dorothea Røring (1710-1772). Jakob Edvard Colbjørnsen, along with his brothers, Edvard Røring Colbjørnsen (1751–1792), Christian Colbjørnsen attended the Christiania Cathedral School.

He studied law at the University of Copenhagen. Subsequently, he served as a professor of law at the University of Copenhagen and later as extraordinary assessor in the Supreme Court. He served as the chief justice from 1799 until his death in 1802. His brother, Christian Colbjørnsen was chief justice of Denmark-Norway from 1804 until 1814.

== Personal life ==
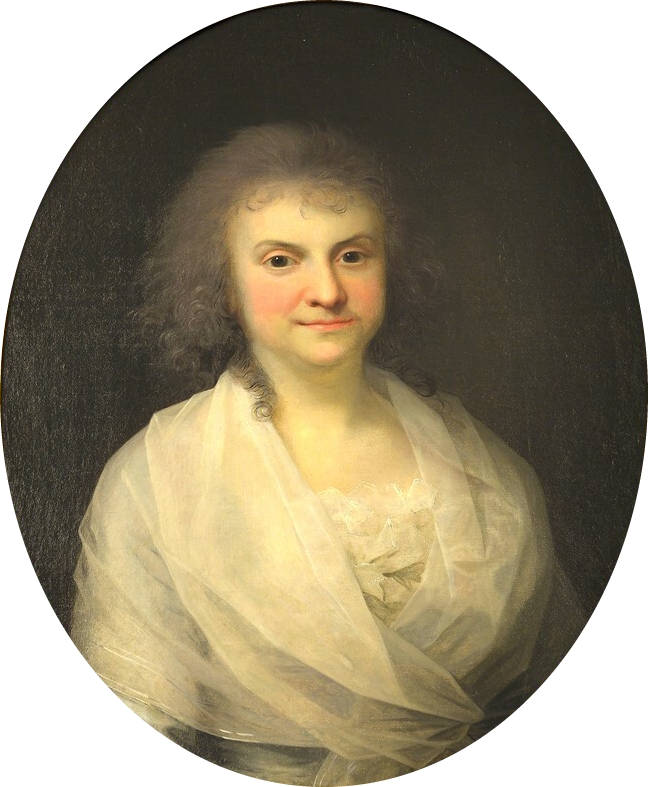
Kristine Colbjørnsen painted by Jens Juel, Museum Lolland-Flaster.

Rdward Colbjørnsen was married twice. His first wife was Marie Hansen (1739-1782). His second wife was Kristine Colbjørnsen (née Hoffgaard) (1754-1802), widow of Hans Tersling (1736-1785) til Vennerslund- She bore him two children. The son Jacob Edvard Colbjørnsen was a jurist (cand.jur.). The daughter Anna Dorothea af Colbjørnsen (1792-1808) was married to count Frederik Christopher Trampe (1779-1832). who served as diocesan governor of Trondheim.
