= Supreme Court (Denmark) =

Supreme court of Denmark

Coordinates: 55.6758°N 12.5789°E

- Højesteret
- Logo of the Supreme Court

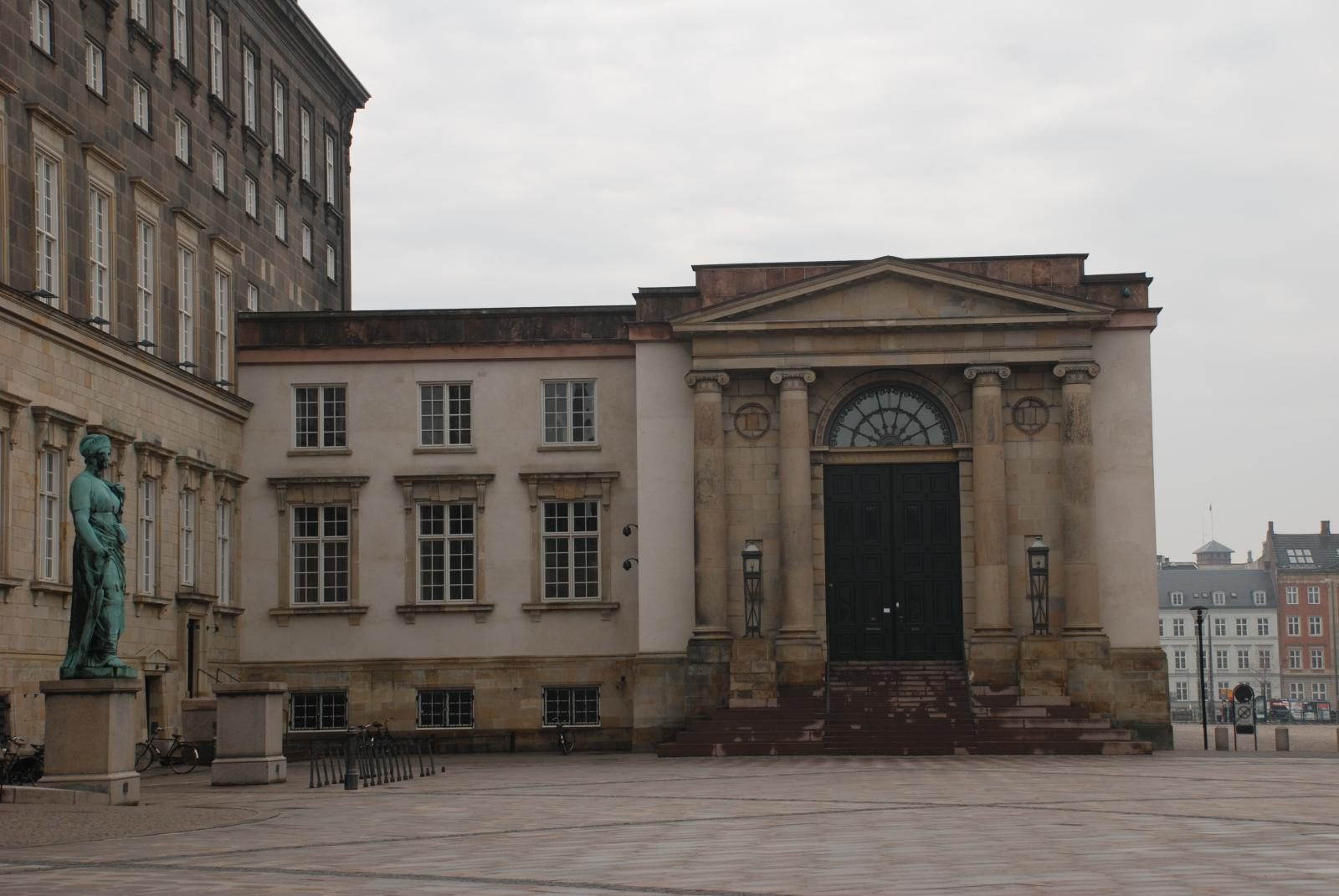
- The entrance to the Supreme Court at Christiansborg Palace
- Established: February 14, 1661; 365 years ago
- Location: Christiansborg Palace, Copenhagen
- Authorised by: Danish Constitution
- Judge term length: Mandatory retirement at age 70
- Number of positions: 18
- Website: hoejesteret.dk (Danish) supremecourt.dk (English)

President of the Supreme Court
- Currently: Jens Peter Christensen
- Since: November 1, 2022; 3 years ago

The Supreme Court (Danish: Højesteret, lit. Highest Court, Faroese: Hægstirættur, Greenlandic: Eqqartuussiviit Qullersaat) is the supreme court and the third and final instance in all civil and criminal cases in the Kingdom of Denmark. It is based at Christiansborg Palace in Copenhagen which also houses the Danish Parliament and the Prime Minister's office.

== History ==
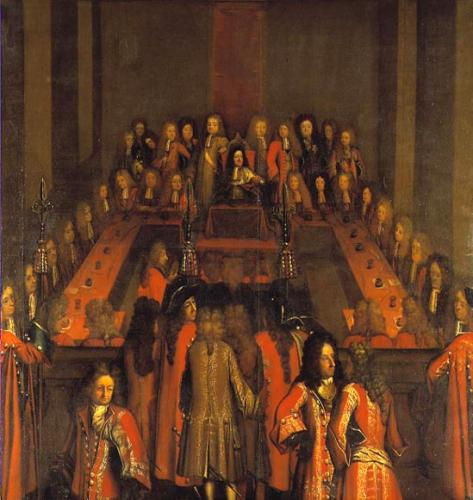
King Christian V presiding over the Supreme Court in 1697.

The Supreme Court was founded on 14 February 1661 by King Frederik III as a replacement of King Christian IV's King's Court (da. Kongens Retterting). It was based at first Copenhagen Castle later Christiansborg Palace, which was built in its place on the same site at Slotsholmen, and originally consisted of 30 justices. From its foundation and until the adoption of the Constitution of 1849, the court was formally an instrument of the king, only deciding cases by a majority vote in the king's absence, most kings only attended the first meeting each supreme court year. An office as justitiarius to lead the court was instituted as early as 1674 (from 1919 with title of President). As absolute monarch the king retained the inherent power to overrule the court, which happened on one occasion. Aside from this the court routinely exercised the power to commute criminal sentences, a power that was written into the constitution of 1849.

After the 1794 Fire of the Christiansborg Palace, the Supreme Court moved first to the Prince's Mansion (da. Prinsens Palæ) until 1854, now housing the National Museum of Denmark, and then to one of the four mansions of Amalienborg Palace (1854–1864), before moving back to Slotsholmen. After the fire of the second Christianborg Palace in 1884 the Supreme Court had to move once again and was based at Bernstorffs Palæ in Bredgade until 1919 when it could move back to the present Christiansborg Palace.

Since a rule change in 2007, the court have had a greater focus on test cases that establish precedent.

== Function ==
The Supreme Court functions as a civil and criminal appellate court for cases from the subordinate courts. Since a decision cannot normally be appealed more than once, District Court cases rarely reach Supreme Court-level, though this may be the case if the independent Appeals Permission Board grants a leave of appeal.

Significant civil cases with issues of principle, however, are typically deferred to one of the two Danish High Courts as courts of first instance. In those cases sentences from the Eastern or Western High Courts (Østre Landsret and Vestre Landsret) may be directly appealed to The Supreme Court.

As its name indicates, the Supreme Court is the highest Court in the Kingdom of Denmark and its judgments cannot be appealed to another Danish court. It is split into two chambers which both hear all types of cases. A case is heard by at least five judges. In all, the court consists of normally 15 judges and a president.

Unlike criminal cases in the lower courts, the Supreme Court does not deal with the issue of guilt. However, the basis on which the lower court reached its verdict may be brought into consideration and edited. In criminal trials by jury in the first instance, the defence may appeal on grounds of judicial error regarding the judges' direction to the jury (the summing-up of the theoretical foundations, which should be taken into consideration when the jurors deliberate).

== Current members ==
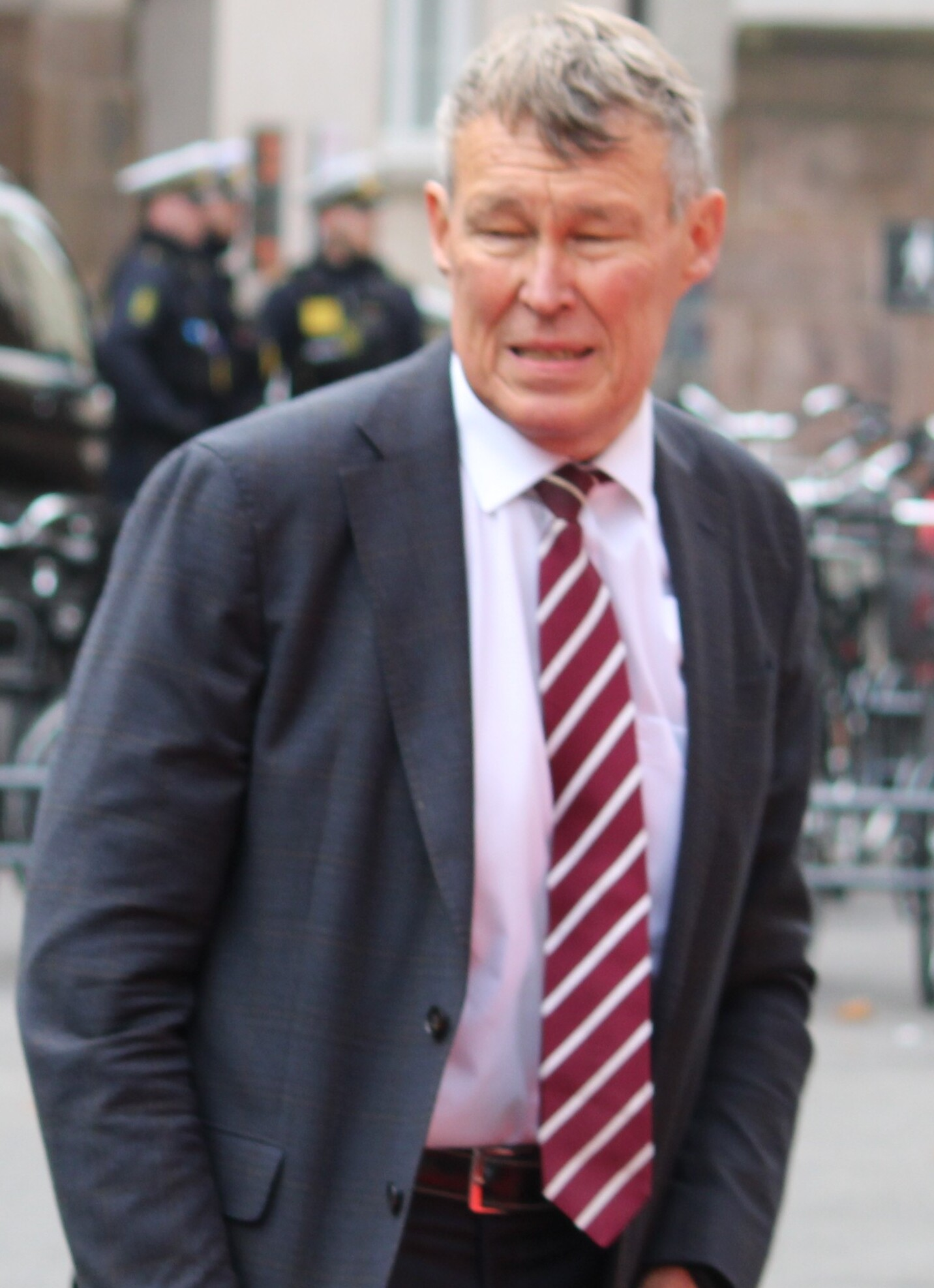
Jens Peter Christensen, president since 2022

There are 18 judges in the Supreme Court. One of the Supreme Court justices is president of the Supreme Court, appointed by the other judges. A judge is the chairman of the Appeals Permission Board and a judge is on leave to serve as a judge of the European Court of Justice in Luxembourg.

The Judges of the Supreme Court, like other judges, are appointed by the Minister of Justice on the recommendation of the Independent Board of Judges.

Judges shall be retired at the end of the month in which they reach the age of 70, as according to section 5 of the Civil Service Act.

The Supreme Court Judges of Denmark, as of December 2022:
Name	Born	Assumed office	Comment
Jens Peter Christensen	1 November 1956	2006	President of the Supreme Court from 1 November 2022.
Lars Bay Larsen	8 June 1953	2003	Leave since 2006: Judge of the European Court of Justice
Poul Dahl Jensen	21 June 1956	2004	
Vibeke Steen Rønne	7 March 1953	2005	
Michael Rekling	18 February 1958	2007	
Hanne Schmidt	9 March 1960	2009	
Lars Hjortnæs	16 September 1960	2010	
Oliver Talevski	23 March 1964	2011	Chairman of the Appeals Permission Board
Jan Schans Christensen	15 August 1957	2012	
Kurt Rasmussen	7 July 1958	2012	
Jens Kruse Mikkelsen	23 July 1965	2013	
Lars Apostoli	16 February 1961	2014	
Anne Louise Bormann	25 August 1967	2016	
Kristian Korfits Nielsen	4 April 1968	2017	
Jørgen Steen Sørensen	21 April 1965	2019	
Ole Hasselgaard	3 April 1967	2021	
Rikke Foersom	13 November 1974	2021	
Søren Højgaard Mørup	8 April 1973	2022	

== List of presidents ==
- 1661-1674 Peder Reedtz
- 1674-1676 Peder Schumacher Griffenfeld
- 1676-1686 Frederik Ahlefeldt
- 1686-1690 Michael Vibe
- 1690-1708 Conrad Reventlow
- (1708-1719 Caspar Schøller)
- 1720-1721 Frederik Rostgaard
- 1721-1730 Ulrik Adolf Holstein
- 1730-1740 Iver Rosenkrantz
- 1740-1748 Johan Ludvig Holstein
- 1748-1758 Claus Reventlow

=== Justitiarii (until 1919) ===
- 1674-1676 Otto Pogwisch
- 1676-1679 Ove Juul
- 1679-1683 Holger Vind
- 1683-1690 Michael Vibe
- 1690-1704 Willum Worm
- 1705-1719 Caspar Schøller
- 1720-1721 Frederik Rostgaard
- 1721-1726 Christian Scavenius
- 1726-1736 Christian Braem
- 1736-1737 Thomas Bartholin den yngste
- 1737-1743 Didrik Seckman
- 1743-1758 Oluf Borch de Schouboe
- 1758-1763 Hans Frederik von Levetzau
- 1763-1765 Caspar Christopher Bartholin (acting)
- 1765-1769 Mogens Rosenkrantz
- 1769-1769 Villum Berregaard
- 1769-1776 Jens Krag-Juel-Vind
- 1776-1780 Henrik Hielmstierne
- 1780-1782 Peder Rosenørn
- 1782-1788 Adolph Sigfried von der Osten
- 1788-1789 Jørgen Erik Skeel
- 1790-1794 Christian Urne
- 1794-1799 Stephan Hofgaard Cordsen
- 1799-1802 Jakob Edvard Colbjørnsen
- 1802-1804 Frederik Julius Kaas
- 1804-1814 Christian Colbjørnsen
- 1815-1822 Peter Feddersen
- 1822-1843 Anker Vilhelm Frederik Bornemann
- 1843-1856 Frederik von Lowzow
- 1856-1856 Johannes Ephraim Larsen
- 1856-1861 Peter Georg Bang
- 1861-1861 Anton Wilhelm Scheel (acting)
- 1861-1871 Christian Michael Rottbøll
- 1871-1880 Charles Ferdinand Léonard Mourier
- 1880-1897 P.C.N. Buch
- 1897-1907 Peter Frederik Koch
- 1907-1909 C.C.V. Nyholm
- 1909-1915 Niels Lassen
- 1915-1918 Edvard Hvidt
- 1918-1919 Richard Severin Gram (original title was justitiarius, changed to præsident in 1919)

=== Presidents (since 1919) ===
- 1919-1928: Richard Severin Gram (original title was justitiarius, changed to præsident in 1919)
- 1928-1936: Cosmus Meyer
- 1936-1944: Troels G. Jørgensen
- 1944-1953: Thomas Frølund
- 1953-1958: Asbjørn Drachmann Bentzon
- 1958-1964: Otto Irminger Kaarsberg
- 1964-1971: Aage Lorenzen
- 1971-1975: Jørgen Trolle
- 1975-1981: Mogens Hvidt
- 1981-1990: Peter Christensen
- 1990-2001: Niels Pontoppidan
- 2001-2004: Jacques Hermann
- 2004-2010: Torben Melchior
- 2010-2014: Børge Dahl
- 2014-2017: Poul Søgaard
- 2017-2022: Thomas Rørdam
- From 2022: Jens Peter Christensen

== See also ==
- Courts of Denmark
- Judiciary of Greenland
