= Charles Ferdinand Léonard Mourier =

Danish Supreme Court justice

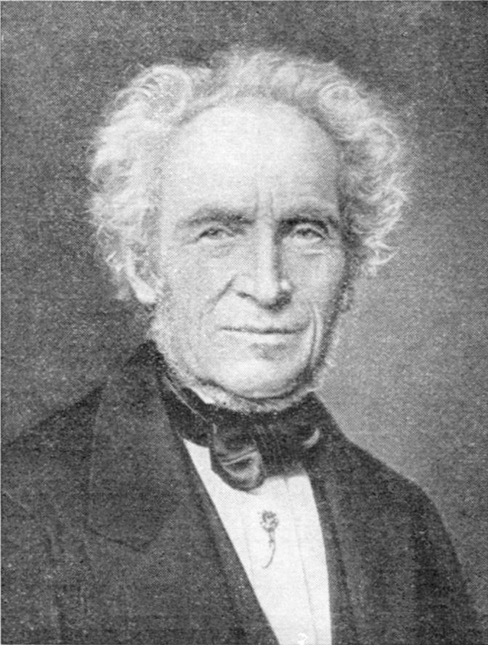
Charles Ferdinand Léonard Mourier.

Charles Ferdinand Leonard Mourier (1 December 1800 – 25 June 1880) was a Danish Supreme Court justice. He served as president of the Supreme Court from 1871 until his death nine years later.

== Early life and education ==
Mourier was born on 1 December 1800 in Copenhagen, the son of René Pierre François Mourier (1768–1836) and Christiane Frederikke Fabricius 1776-1822). His father had served as director of the Danish Asiatic Company. One of his paternal uncles, Pierre Paul Ferdinand Mourier, had also worked for the Danish Asiatic Company' His paternalt grandfather Jean Ferdinand Mourier served as minister of the French reformed congregation in Copenhagen. Mourier completed his secondary schooling in 1818. He earned a law degree from the University of Copenhagen on 19 October 1822.

== Career ==
On 24 October 1822, Mourier became private secretary for Anders Sandøe Ørsted and a volunteer in Danske Kancelli. In 1826, he won the university's gold medal. On 5 May 1830, he was promoted to a more senior position in Danske Kancelli (Kancellist). On 21 October 1831, he became acting judge at Landsoversamt Hof- og Stadsretten. On 20 June 1832, he became a permanent judge at the same court. He was a member of a number of important commissions.

In 1846, he went on a longer journey abroad. He visited Germany, Switzerland, Austria, Greece, Turley and the Middle East. On 19 May 1852, he became a Supreme Court justice. In 1857, he became a member of Rigsretten (president from11 March 1761). On 15 January 1871, he became president of the Supreme Court.

In 1860—1871, he was a member of the legal board of directors of Det Danske Klasselotteri. In 1865, he was appointed as one of the directors of the Alm. Brandassurancekompagni for Varer og Effekter.> On 6 Jine 1879, he became president of the Bank of Denmark.

== Politics ==
Mourier had a brief political career. In 1849, he was elected to Folketinget in Copenhagen's 6th District. He did not run again in the next election. On 26 July 1854, he became a member of Rigsrådet by royal appointment.

== Personal life ==
Mourier was married to Johanne Bertine Heineth. She was a daughter of Lutheran minister Hans Ditlev Heineth and Edel Marie Fabricius. They were the parents of Christian Ditlev Mourier, Reinhard Peter August Mourier. Carl Lauritz Mourier -nd Laura Emilie Mourier.

== Awards ==
Mourier was awarded the title of justitsråd in 1842, konferensråd in 1862.

On 5 October 1850, he became a Knight of the Order of the Dannebrog. On 18 November 1859, he was awarded the Cross of Honour. On 11 May 1868, he became a Commander of the Order of the Dannebrog. 18 November 1871, he was awarded the Grand Cross of the Order of the Dannebrog.
