= Danish Prosecution Service =

The Danish Prosecution Service (Danish: anklagemyndigheden) is the Danish public entity who is responsible for the prosecution of criminal charges. It consists of the Director of Public Prosecutions (Rigsadvokaten), the regional prosecutors (Statsadvokaterne) and on the lowest level the chief police constables (Politimestrene).

== Purpose ==
The Danish Prosecution Service is tasked with the prosecution of criminal offenses while upholding the due process of law and ensuring procedural fairness. Its core mission is to ensure that offenders are held accountable in accordance with the law, while simultaneously safeguarding innocent persons from prosecution.

The institution operates under high ideals of objectivity, independence, and integrity. As a critical component of Denmark's legal system, it is responsible for maintaining the country's status as a nation founded on the rule of law. The Service is committed to handling cases with timeliness and clarity, aiming to maintain the high level of public confidence traditionally held by the Danish criminal justice system.

== Structure ==
=== Director of Public Prosecutions ===
The Director of Public Prosecutions is head of the Prosecution Service, and he conducts prosecutions in criminal cases before the Supreme Court.

=== Regional Public Prosecutors ===
Regional public prosecutors attend to criminal cases before the High Courts and superintend the chief constables. It is also regional public prosecutors who deal with complaints against the police and cases concerning compensation for decisions made by chief constables in criminal prosecutions. The Public Prosecutor for Serious Economic Crime attends to cases involving serious financial crime, on a national basis. The Special International Crimes Office attends to crimes committed by foreigners outside Denmark.

=== Police Districts ===
Chief constables are prosecutors in the district courts in their respective districts. As they are, at the same time, head of the police district, they are also responsible for police investigations of breaches of the law in the district. The local prosecution service is, in practice, attended to by the attorneys and police officials of the police district.

=== Public prosecution services and structuring of sentencing ===
The prosecution has taken new bigger roles and new structuring techniques of sentencing. The techniques are: preparing work to statutory amendments ,prosecution guidelines and prosecution driven court practice database.
