= Østre Landsret =

Coordinates: 55.6862°N 12.5906°E

Eastern High Court
- Østre Landsret
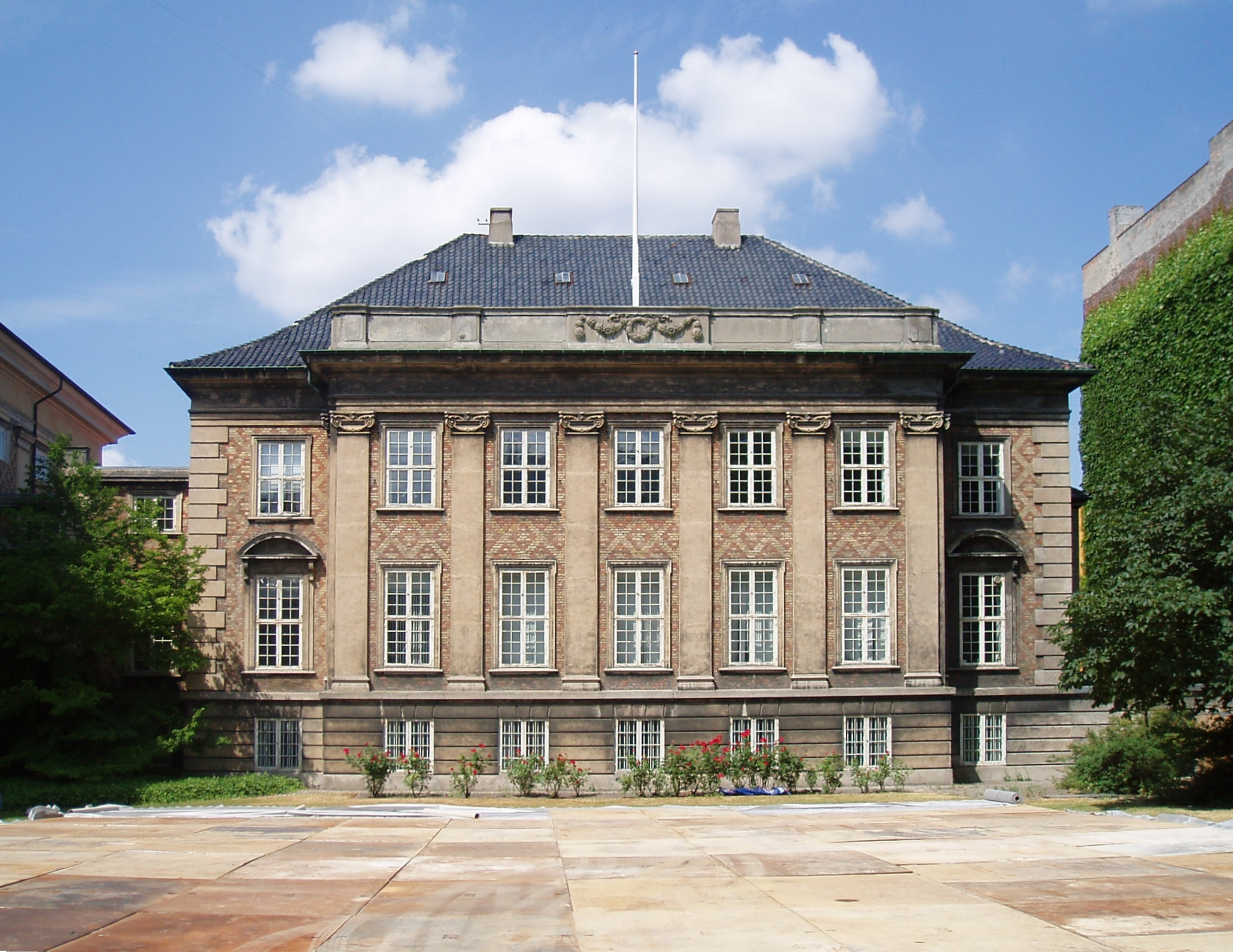
- Main building of The Eastern High Court
- Established: 1919; 106 years ago
- Jurisdiction: Eastern Denmark
- Location: Copenhagen
- Authorised by: Danish Constitution
- Appeals to: Supreme Court of Denmark
- Number of positions: 60
- Website: Official Website

President of Eastern High Court
- Currently: Bent Carlsen
- Since: November 1, 2005; 20 years ago

Chief of the Secretariat
- Currently: Ellen Busck Porsbo

The Østre Landsret (Eastern High Court), established in 1919, is one of Denmark's two High Courts, along with the Vestre Landsret (Western High Court). Both High Courts function as a civil and criminal appellate court for cases from the subordinate courts and furthermore as a court of first instance in significant civil cases with issues of principle.

The Østre Landsret sits in Copenhagen but has chambers in some western towns and cities, such as Odense, used only for criminal cases. It has jurisdiction over all County Courts in Zealand, Funen, Lolland, Falster and Bornholm as well as the Faroe Islands. A municipal court decision can always be appealed to a High Court - if the disputed claim exceeds DKK 10.000.

The Østre Landsret has one President and 58 judges. Like the Vestre Landsret, it is split into chambers, each consisting of three High Court judges. Though the President of the High Court appoints a presiding judge for each chamber, all decisions are reached by a simple majority, in all types of cases.

== See also ==
- Courts of Denmark
