= Polish Media Council =

Journalism organization in Poland

- Formation: October 10, 2023; 2 years ago
- Purpose: press freedom, journalism
- Location: Warsaw, Poland
- Official language: Polish
- Chairperson: Bartosz Węglarczyk
- Key people: Vice Chairpersons: Jerzy Baczyński, Kamila Ceran, Brygida Grysiak, Barbara Kasprzycka, Magdalena Kicińska, Aleksandra Sobczak, Michał Szułdrzyński
- Affiliations: Press Club Polska
- Website: www.radamediow.pl

The Polish Media Council (PMC) (Polish: Rada Polskich Mediów) is a self-regulatory organization of Polish press, radio, television and internet editorial offices. The members of the organization are editors-in-chief and deputy editors-in-chief of Polish media.

The goals of PMC include: protection of freedom of speech, raising and dissemination of professional and ethical standards of journalism, initiating and issuing opinions on legislative solutions in the area of media operation and freedom and protection of the journalistic profession.

The Polish Media Council is composed of editors representing the following media: Dziennik Gazeta Prawna, Fakt, Gazeta Wyborcza, Newsweek Polska, Pismo. Magazyn Opinii, Polityka, Rzeczpospolita, Tygodnik Powszechny, Business Insider Polska, Fakty TVN, Gazeta.pl, OKO.press, Onet.pl, Radio RMF FM, Radio TOK FM, Radio ZET, Radiozet.pl, TVN 24, TVN24 BiS, TVN24.pl and Wirtualna Polska.

== Council authorities ==
Presidium of the Polish Media Council of the 1st term 2023-2025

- Chairman - Bartosz Węglarczyk
- Vice-chairpersons - Jerzy Baczyński, Marek Balawajder, Kamila Ceran, Brygida Grysiak, Barbara Kasprzycka, Magdalena Kicińska, Aleksandra Sobczak, Michał Szułdrzyński
- Secretary General - representative of Press Club Polska
