= Danish Court Administration =

- Domstolsstyrelsen

Agency overview
- Formed: 1 July 1999
- Headquarters: Copenhagen
- Agency executive: Charlotte Münter
- Parent agency: Ministry of Justice
- Website: www.domstol.dk

The Danish Court Administration (Danish: Domstolsstyrelsen) is the national council of the judiciary of Denmark. It is an independent institution responsible for the management and development of the Danish court system and Appeals Permission Board.

The Danish Court Administration was established on July 1, 1999. It is run by an eleven-member board of governors and director, and subordinate to the Ministry of Justice. It maintains a degree of autonomy, and the Ministry of Justice cannot alter decisions made by the Court Administration.

The Board of Governors consists of 11 members. Eight of them are representatives of the court, one is a lawyer, and two "have special management and social insights".

== See also ==
- Courts of Denmark
