= Christian Colbjørnsen =

Danish-Norwegian judge (1749–1814)

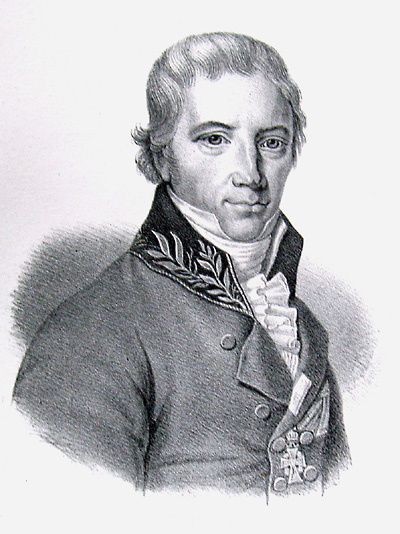
Christian Colbjørnsen

Christian Colbjørnsen (29 January 1749 – 17 December 1814) served as the Chief Justice of Denmark–Norway from 1802 until 1814.

== Background ==
Christian Colbjørnsen was born in Sørum, Akershus, in the traditional region of Romerike, Norway. His parents were Colbjørn Colbjørnsen Jacobsen (1714–1761) and Anna Dorothea Røring (1710–1772). Along with his brothers, Jakob Edvard Colbjørnsen (1744–1802) and Edvard Røring Colbjørnsen (1751–1792), Christian Colbjørnsen began at Christiania Cathedral School in February 1758. He left school at the end of 1763 without having completed the examination, probably because of his father's death. His relative Christian Petersen, who was Governor of Oppland, took Christian into his house and gave him work in his office. In 1768, Petersen became Prefect of Bergen. Christian followed him there and seems to have been there through the end of 1771.

== Career ==
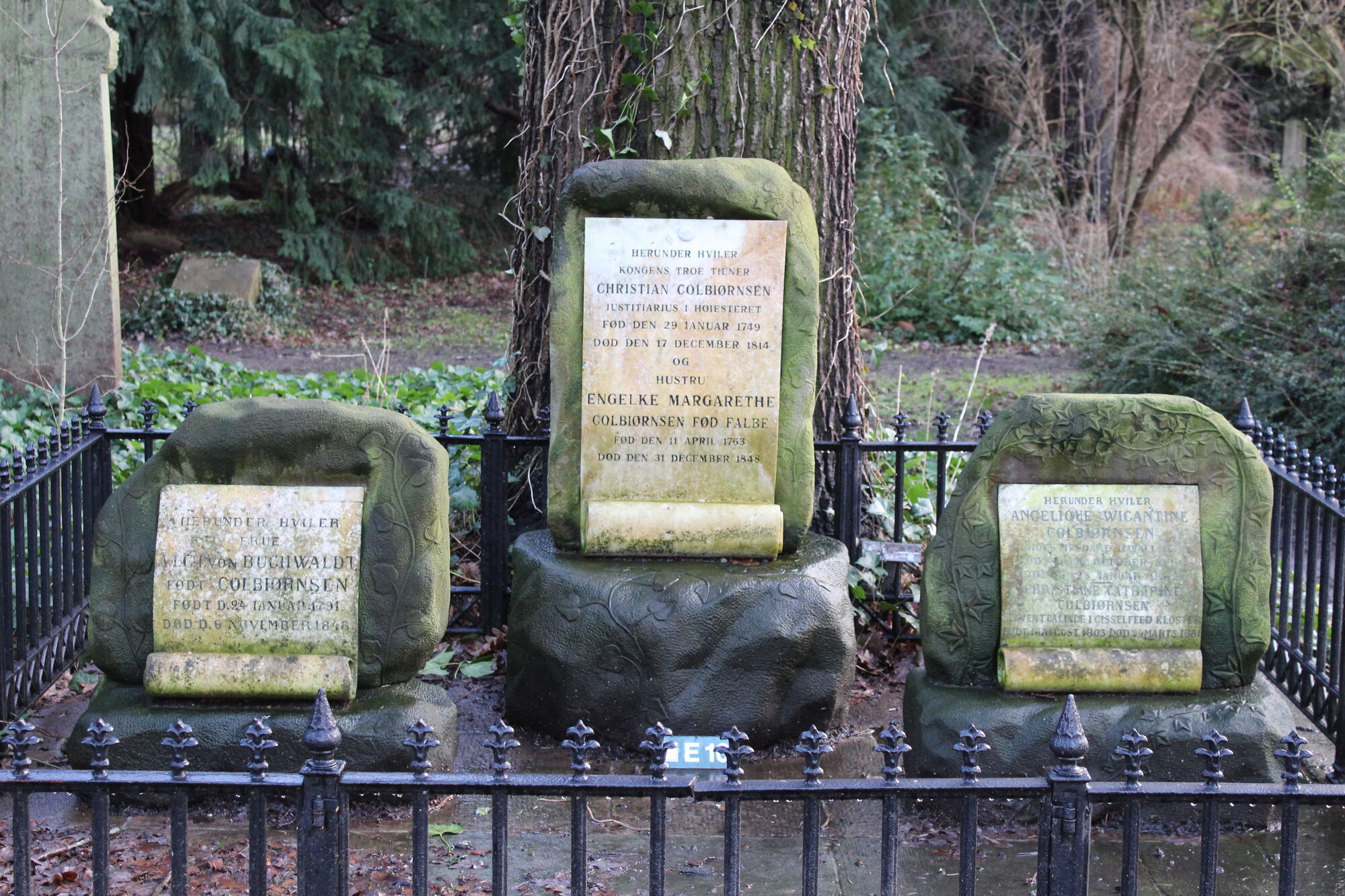
Christian Colbjørnsen's tombstone in Copenhagen's Assistens Cemetery.

Christian Colbjørnsen became a key official in Denmark and Norway. He set clear traces in the work of the Danish peasant reforms 1786–88. He was a leading force behind much of the legislative work that Danish Chancellery initiated in 1790s. He has also been of great importance in shaping the Supreme Court's role in the Danish-Norwegian history in the early 19th century.

From 1773, he served as lawyer and he was chamber attorney from 1780 to 1785. From August 1786, Colbjørnsen was secretary of the Rural Commission (Landbokommisjonen), a Danish committee appointed by then-Crown Prince Frederik, Regent of Denmark. The purpose of the commission was to develop proposals for improvements in agriculture and set up clear guidelines for the relationship between landlords and peasants farmers.

In 1788 he was appointed president of work for the Chancellery and had great influence on Danish legislation. From 1804 until his death, Christian Colbjørnsen served as Chief Justice for the Supreme Court (Da. Højesteret, Nor. Høyesterett) located in the Danish-Norwegian capital, Copenhagen. Colbjørnsen was an energetic and authoritative leader of the Supreme Court who was an avid supporter of an enlightened autocracy.

== Bibliography ==
- Bjørn, Claus (1995). The Laws are given force: A Biography of Christian Colbiørnsen (Lovene gives kraft. En biografi af Chr. Colbiørnsen). Copenhagen: Lindhardt og Ringhof. ISBN 9788726101331.
