= Danish Press Council =

Coordinates: 55.6834°N 12.5829°E

Danish Press Council (Danish: Pressenævnet) is a Danish independent public tribunal press council under the Ministry of Justice, established pursuant to the Danish Media Liability Act of 1 January 1992, to deal with complaints about the Danish mass media. The Press Council is located in Copenhagen.

The Press Council cannot impose a sentence on the mass media or assure the complainant financial compensation. In cases concerning sound press ethics the Press Council can express its criticism. In cases about reply the Council may direct the editor of the mass media in question to publish a reply. In both types of cases the Council may direct the editor to publish the decision of the Council to an extent specified by the Council.

The Council consists of eight people. As of 21 November 2005 they are;

- Chief Justice - Niels Grubbe
- Chief Justice - Lene Pagter Kristensen
- Advocate - Axel Kierkegaard
- Advocate - Jesper Rothe
- Journalist - Kaare R. Skou, TV 2
- Journalist - Ulrik Holmstrup, tvDOKfilm
- Journalist - Lene Sarup, Fyens Stiftstidende
- Press photographer - Lars Lindskov, freelance
