= Ministry of Justice (Denmark) =

Government ministry of Denmark

Kingdom of Denmark Ministry of Justice
- Justitsministeriet
- Coat of arms of Denmark

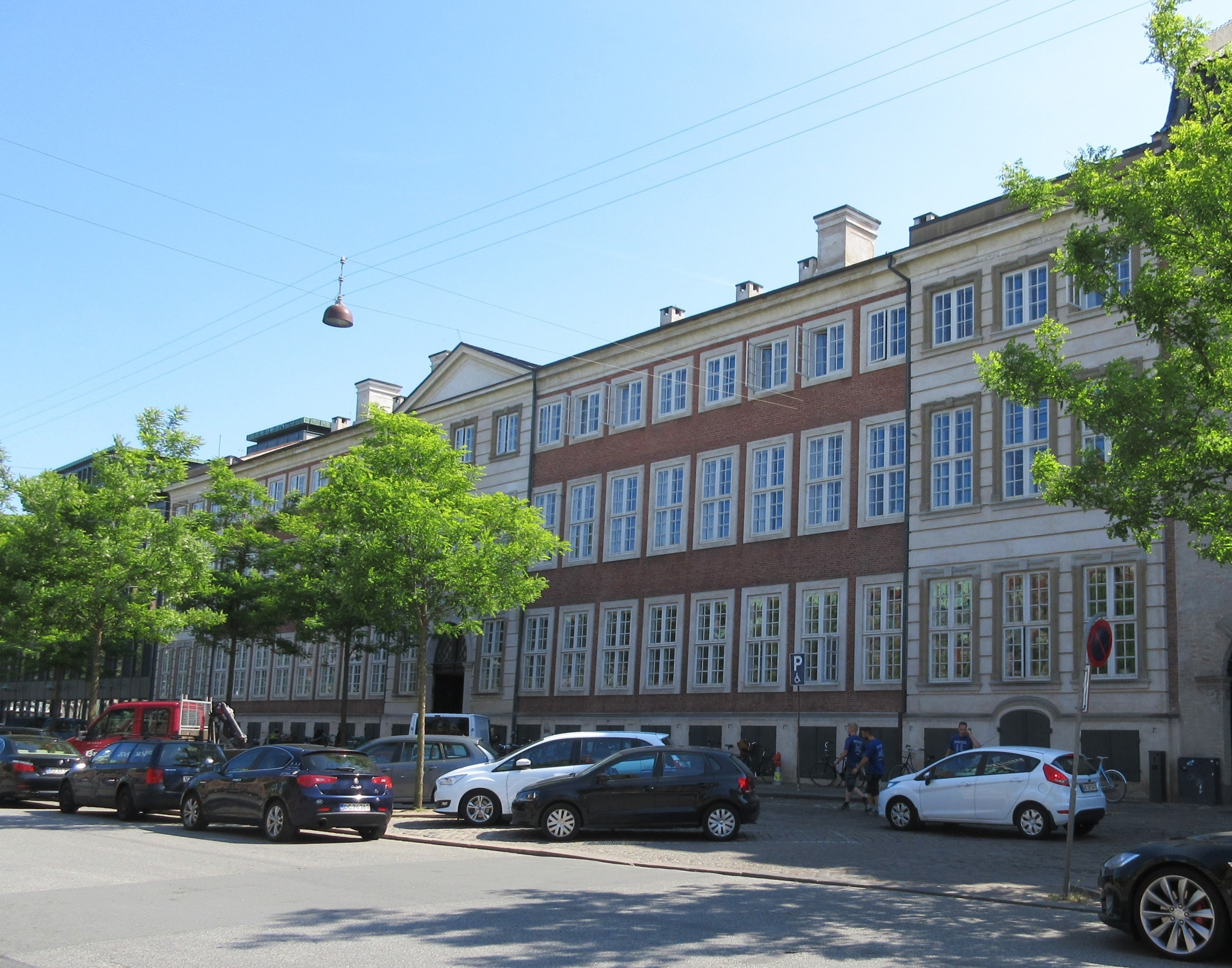
- The Ministry's headquarters at 10 Slotsholmsgade in Copenhagen.

Agency overview
- Formed: 1848
- Jurisdiction: Kingdom of Denmark
- Headquarters: Copenhagen
- Agency executive: Nicolai Wammen, Minister of Justice
- Website: www.justitsministeriet.dk

Ministry of Justice of Denmark (Danish: Justitsministeriet, Faroese: Dómsmálaráðið, Greenlandic: Inatsiseqarnermut Ministereqarfik) is the Danish government ministry which oversees the judicial system (Danish: Justitsvæsnet) and is led by the Justice Minister.

The ministry is responsible for the general judicial system, including the police and the prosecution service, the courts of law, and the penal system. In addition, the Ministry is responsible for legislation in the areas of criminal, private and family law, the law of trusts and foundations, nationality law and data protection law. The Ministry of Justice of Denmark might oversee the administration of justice in Greenland.

== History ==
The Ministry of Justice was established in 1848 following the dissolution of the Danske Kancelli. Initially, the ministry was also responsible for administering military conscription and healthcare. The authority over conscription was transferred to the Ministry of the Interior in 1915 and healthcare was transferred to the Ministry of Health in 1926. The ministry also formerly had authority over matters related to foreign nationals and citizenship, which were transferred, respectively, to the Ministry of the Interior in 1993 and the Minister for Integration in 2001. Some responsibility over cases concerning immigration and citizenship were returned to the ministry in 2011 by the Thorning-Schmidt I Cabinet.

In 1999, an independent board of governors, the Danish Court Administration, was created. It took over responsibility of the Courts Department which had previously been under the authority of the Ministry of Justice, as political fear of concentration of power within the ministry had grown.

== Authority ==
The Ministry of Justice is responsible for the enforcement of safety, security, law and justice in Denmark. In criminal proceedings, it has oversight over the Police of Denmark, the Danish Security and Intelligence Service, the Courts of Denmark, and the Danish Prison and Probation Service.

Within the Danish government, the Ministry of Justice acts as the legal guarantor of the legislation and administration provided by other ministries. Its legislative department reviews bills from other ministries before they are submitted to the Council of State and the Folketing.

== Organisation ==
As of 2026, the ministry consists of three departments: the Civil and Police Department (Civil- og Politiafdelingen), the Law Department (Lovafdelingen), and the Administration Department (Administrationsafdelingen). These departments oversee the following bodies:

=== Agencies ===
- Director for Public Prosecution
- Danish Court Administration
- Danish Prison and Probation Service
- Danish Civil Affairs Agency
- Danish Data Protection Agency
- Danish Critical Supply Agency

=== Councils ===
- Retslægerådet (the Forensic Medicine Council)
- Datarådet (the Data Council)
- Dataetisk Råd (Data Ethics Council)
- Det Kriminalpræventive Råd (the Crime Prevention Council)
- Det Grønlandske Kriminalpræventive Råd (The Greenlandic Crime Prevention Council)
- Dommerudnævnelsesrådet (the Judicial Appointment Council)
- Dommerudnævnelsesrådet vedrørende Internationale Dommerstillinger (the Judicial Appointments Council regarding International Judicial Positions)
- Tilsynsrådet vedr. Beskæftigelse af Indsatte (the Supervisory Council for the Occupation of Inmates)
- Konkursrådet (the Bankruptcy Council)
- Politiklagerådet (the Police Complaints Council)
- Rådet for Grønlands Retsvæsen (the Council for the Judiciary of Greenland)
- Rådet for Offerfonden (the Council for the Victim Fund)
- Retsplejerådet (the Council for the Administration of Justice)
- Straffelovrådet (the Criminal Code Council))

=== Boards ===
- Advokatnævnet (the Disciplinary Board of the Bar and Law Society)
- Erstatningsnævnet (Criminal Injuries Compensation Board)
- Det Færøske Erstatningsnævn for Voldsofre (the Faroese Damages Board for Victims of Assault)
- Det Grønlandske Erstatningsnævn for Voldsofre (the Greenlandic Damages Board for Victims of Assault)
- Pressenævnet (the Press Board)
- Procesbevillingsnævnet (the Appeals Permission Board)
- Bibeskæftigelsesnævnet (the Board of Secondary Employment)
- Indsamlingsnævnet (the Collection Board)
- Ungdomskriminalitetsnævnet (the Juvenile Crime Board)

=== Legal commissions ===
- Strafferetsplejeudvalget
- Kursusudvalget for Advokatuddannelsen
- Udvalget om retshjælp og fri proces

=== Other commissions ===
- Justitsministeriets Forskningspolitiske Udvalg
- Kursusudvalget vedr. obligatorisk efteruddannelse af advokat-fuldmægtige
- Undersøgelseskommissionen om SKAT (Commission of Inquiry on the Tax Administration))
- Undersøgelseskommissionen om hjemsendelser i Forsvarets Efterretningstjeneste (FE-kommissionen II) (Commission of Inquiry on the relievement of dutys in the Danish Defense Intelligence Service (DDIS Commission II)

=== Committee ===
- Bestyrelsen for Domstolsstyrelsen

=== Inspections ===
- Danish Data Protection Agency
- Statens Våbenkontrol

== See also ==
- Justice ministry
- Politics of Denmark
