= High Court of Greenland =

Highest court in Greenland

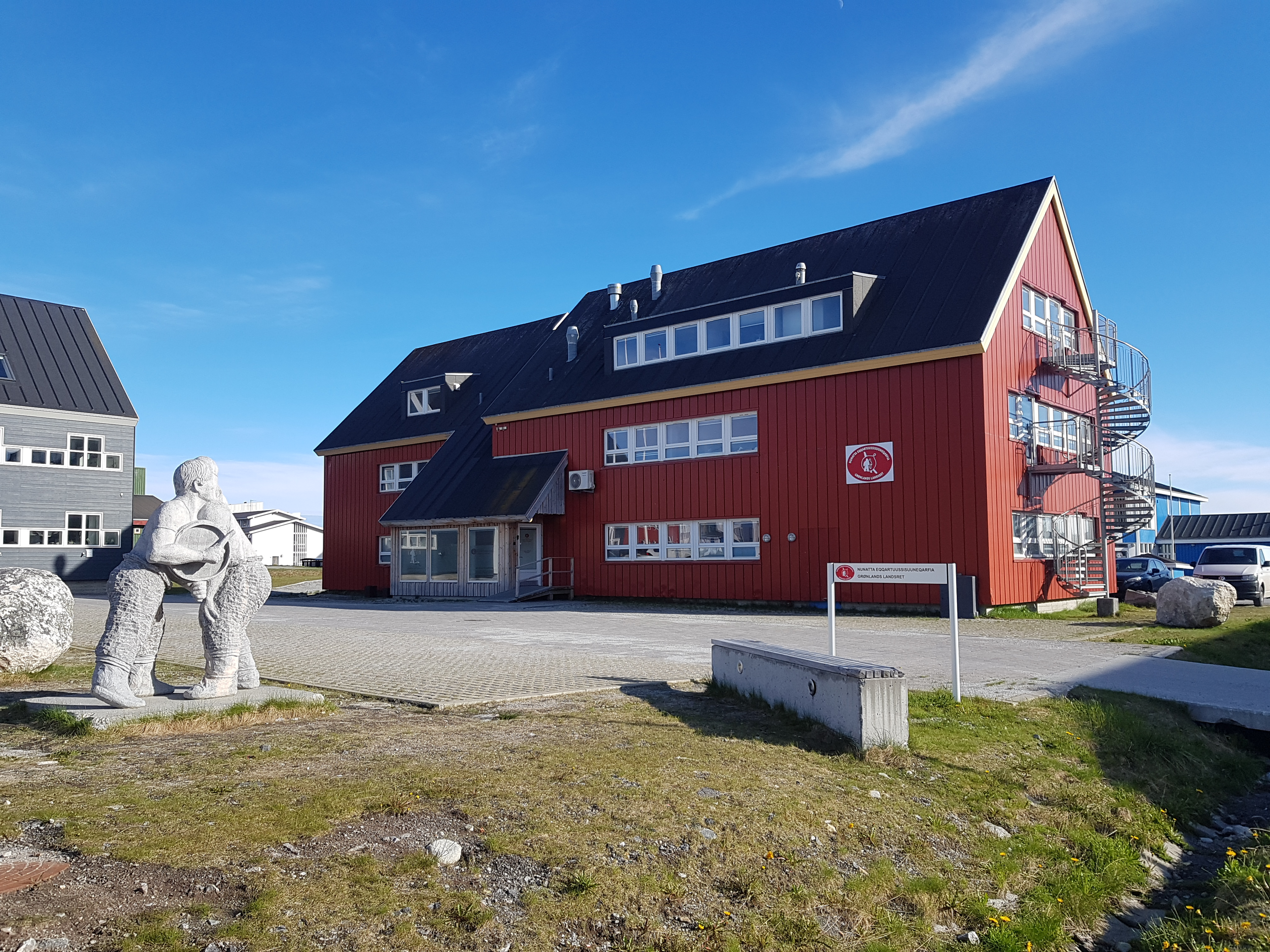
High Court of Greenland in Nuuk

The High Court of Greenland (Greenlandic: Kalaallit Nunaanni Eqqartuussisuuneqarfik - Danish: Grønlands Landsret) is the central court of Greenland, located in the capital city, Nuuk. It exists alongside 18 other magistrates' courts, handling most major cases. It is the supreme court in Greenland, however inferior to Supreme Court of Denmark.

The magistrates' courts hear lesser civil and criminal cases but under certain circumstances, the High Court may assume the hearing of a case if it is found to require special legal insight. If a decision made by a magistrates' court is controversial it may be appealed in the high court.
