= Vestre Landsret =

Coordinates: 56°27′06″N 9°24′44″E

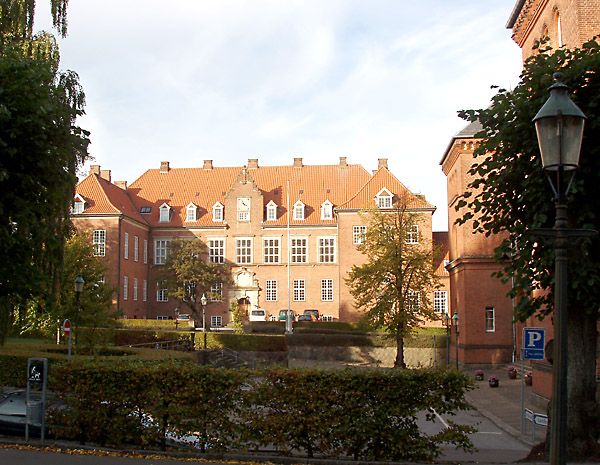
Vestre Landsret building at Viborg until 2014

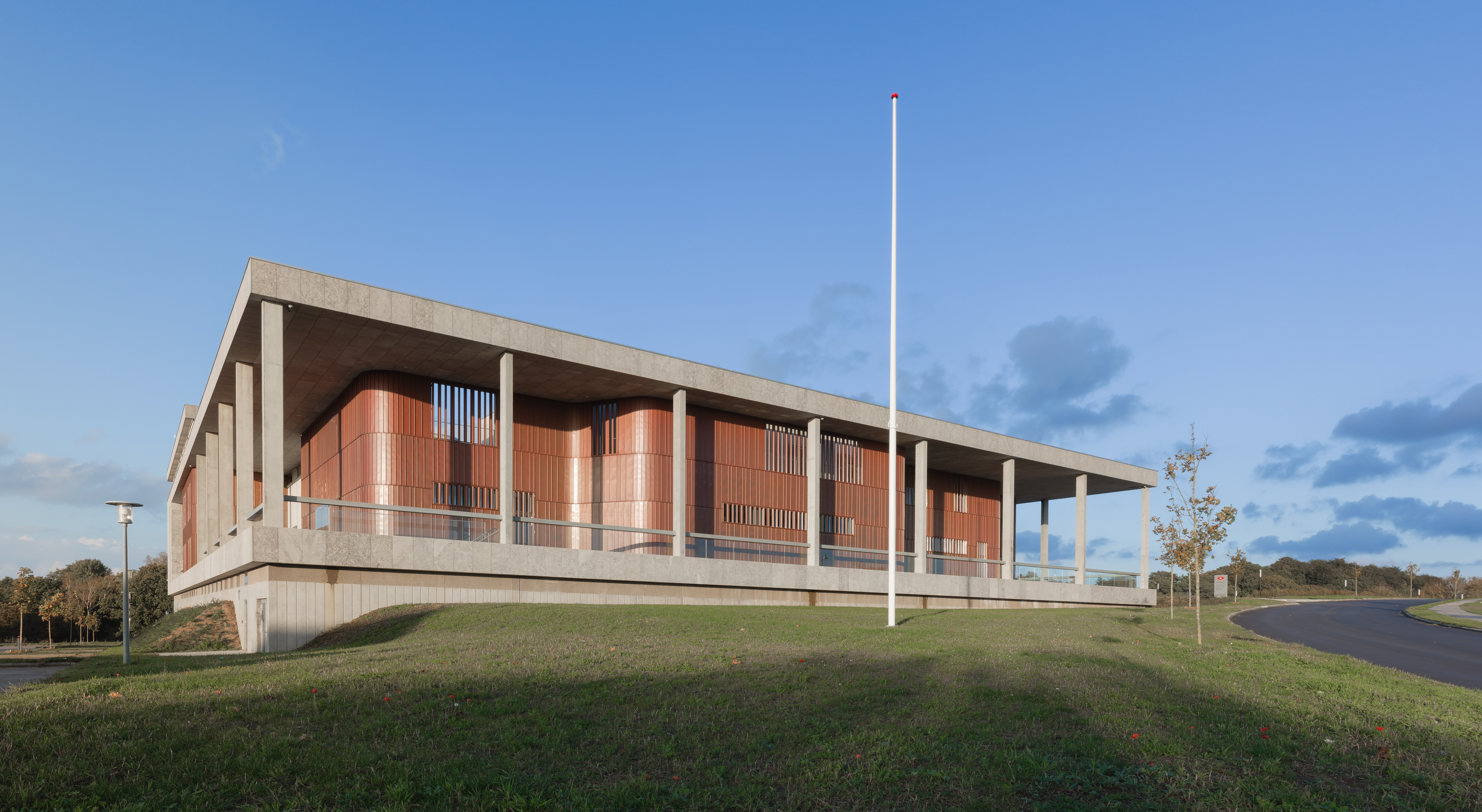
The seat of Vestre Landsret from 2014

The Vestre Landsret (High Court of Western Denmark) is one of Denmark's two High Courts, along with the Østre Landsret (High Court of Eastern Denmark). Both High Courts function both as a civil and criminal court of first instance and a civil and criminal appellate court for cases from the subordinate courts.

The Vestre Landsret sits in Viborg but has chambers in larger western cities, used only for criminal cases. It has jurisdiction over all County Courts in Jutland. A County Court decision can always be appealed to a High Court - if the disputed claim exceeds DKK 10.000.

The Vestre Landsret has one President and 38 judges. Like the Østre Landsret, it is split into chambers, each consisting of three High Court judges. Although the President of the High Court appoints a presiding judge for each chamber, all decisions are reached by a simple majority, in all types of cases.

The Vestre High Court was established in 1919, replacing the Landsoverretten (Country superior court for Northern Jutland). The court's main building in Viborg was built and commissioned in January 1920. It is located on Stænderpladsen in Viborg and was designed by architect Kristoffer Varming. In front of the main entrance to the Vestre High Court stands a bust of lawyer Anders Sandøe Ørsted. In the middle of Stænderpladsen is a statue by sculptor Anker Hoffmann. At Stænderpladsen is another monument associated with the Vestre High Court, namely the memorial stone for Royal Law, arranged in connection with the 700th anniversary of the introduction of the Law of Jutland in 1241.

Over time it became necessary to add premises elsewhere, in line with increased activity. In criminal cases by jury or Lay Assessors the court also uses courtrooms in Aalborg, Aarhus, Kolding, Esbjerg and Sønderborg. Construction of a new courthouse in Viborg was decided by the Danish Parliament in 2010; it was inaugurated in 2014.

== See also ==
- Courts of Denmark
