= Law enforcement in Denmark =

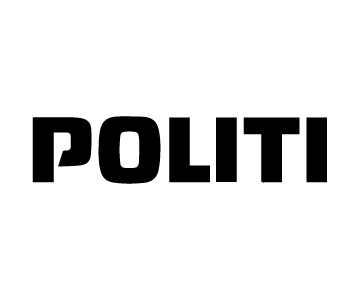
The Danish Police Logo

Law enforcement in Denmark is handled by a number of organisations, under the responsibility of various ministries:

- Ministry of Justice:
  - Police of Denmark, common law enforcement
  - Rigspolitiet, specialised police enforcement
    - Politiets Aktionsstyrke, police special response unit
  - Politiets Efterretningstjeneste, national security and intelligence service
- Tax Ministry:
  - SKAT, tax, customs and border authority
- Ministry of Defence:
  - Forsvarets Efterretningstjeneste, military intelligence and foreign intelligence service
  - Danish Military Police, police enforcement within Danish military
  - Danish Home Guard Police Branch, simple enforcement on behalf of either the Police of Denmark or Danish Military Police
- Ministry of Food, Agriculture and Fisheries:
  - The Danish Food Administration, inspection of food handling companies
  - The Danish Fisheries Directorate, inspection of fishing vessels in Danish waters.

The police are governed by Danish law.

== See also ==
- Crime in Denmark
