= Danish Intelligence Service =

Danish Intelligence Service may refer to:

- Danish Defence Intelligence Service
- Danish Security and Intelligence Service
