= Wamberg committee =

The Wamberg Committee (Danish: Wambergudvalget), is the popular name for Oversight committee regarding the police and military intelligence agencies, (Kontroludvalget vedrørende Politiets og Forsvarets Efterretningstjenester) in Denmark. The name is derived from the name of the first chairman of the committee A. M. Wamberg. The purpose of the committee is to ensure that the intelligence agencies of Denmark are properly registering, handling, and deleting information on people.

The committee was established on June 8, 1964, by the government and was initially only mandated to supervise control with the police intelligence agency registration and management of information of Danish citizens.

In 1978, the military intelligence agency was also added to the oversight responsibilities of the committee. In 1996 the oversight of foreigners registered by the agencies was also added to the oversight responsibilities.

The committee is appointed by the Minister of Justice and consist of a chairman and three members.

The current committee consist of:

- Advokat Niels Fisch-Thomsen (formand) (1989-01-01 -)
- Overarkivar Hans Christian Bjerg (1987-01-01 -)
- Fhv. forlagsdirektør Kurt Christian Fromberg (1993-05-15 -)
- Stiftamtmand Bente Flindt Sørensen (2001-01-11 -)

== Other oversight measures ==
The Danish parliament, Folketinget sets down a parliamentary intelligence agencies control committee, that consist of five members, from each of the five biggest parties.

The parliamentary budget committee (Rigsrevisionen) has oversight and supervision with the budgets.
