= 2025 Lemvig municipal election =

Municipal election in Denmark

- 18 November 2025

All 19 seats to the Lemvig municipal council 10 seats needed for a majority
- Turnout: 11,695 (76.6%) ▲3.5%
	First party	Second party	Third party
	V	Æ	A
Party	Venstre	Denmark Democrats	Social Democrats
Last election	11 seats, 45.5%	Did not stand	4 seats, 19.9%
Seats won	6	4	4
Seat change	▼5	▲4	0
Popular vote	3,527	2,586	2,137
Percentage	30.5%	22.3%	18.5%
Swing	▼15.0%	New	▼1.4%
	Fourth party	Fifth party	Sixth party
	C	F	L
Party	Conservatives	Green Left	Land- og Bylisten
Last election	3 seats, 13.5%	2 seats, 9.9%	Did not stand
Seats won	2	1	1
Seat change	▼1	▼1	▲1
Popular vote	1,107	876	559
Percentage	9.6%	7.6%	4.8%
Swing	▼3.9%	▼2.3%	New
	Seventh party
	B
Party	Social Liberals
Last election	1 seat, 3.5%
Seats won	1
Seat change	0
Popular vote	517
Percentage	4.5%
Swing	▲1.0%
Mayor before election
Erik Flyvholm
Venstre
Mayor after election
Jens Lønborg
Conservatives

The 2025 Lemvig Municipal election was held on November 18, 2025, in the Danish town of Lemvig to elect the 21 members to sit in the regional council for the Lemvig Municipal council, in the period of 2026 to 2029. Despite, losing 5 of the 11 seats won in 2021, the new mayoral candidate from Venstre, Chris Olesen, would initially secure the mayoral position. However, it was revealed that the parties broke out and Jens Lønborg would instead become the new mayor.

== Background ==
Following the 2021 election, Erik Flyvholm from Venstre would continue for a fourth term as mayor. However, Flyvholm announced in August 2024, his decision to stop following this election. Chris Olesen is instead set to become the mayoral candidate of Venstre. The municipal council also reduced it's number from 21 to 19 for this election.

=== 2021 Election Results and notional results with 19 seats contested ===
Parties	Vote		Seats		
Parties	Votes	%	Actual Seats	Notional Seats	+ / -
Venstre	5,222	45.5	11	10	-1
Social Democrats	2,282	19.9	4	4	0
Conservatives	1,549	13.5	3	3	0
Green Left	1,133	5.8	2	2	0
Social Liberals	398	3.5	1	0	-1
Total	11,485	100.0	21	19	-2

== Electoral system ==
For elections to Danish municipalities, a number varying from 9 to 31 are chosen to be elected to the municipal council. The seats are then allocated using the D'Hondt method and a closed list proportional representation. Lemvig Municipality had 21 seats in 2025.

Unlike in Danish General Elections, in elections to municipal councils, electoral alliances are allowed.

== Electoral alliances ==
=== Electoral Alliance 1 ===
Party		Political alignment
A	Social Democrats	Centre-left
B	Social Liberals	Centre to Centre-left
F	Green Left	Centre-left to Left-wing

=== Electoral Alliance 2 ===
Party		Political alignment
C	Conservatives	Centre-right
L	Land- og Bylisten	Local politics
O	Danish People's Party	Right-wing to Far-right
Æ	Denmark Democrats	Right-wing to Far-right

== Results by polling station ==
Division	A	B	C	F	L	O	V	Æ
Division	%	%	%	%	%	%	%	%
Lemvig Idræts- og Kulturcenter	24.4	5.2	13.6	7.8	1.4	1.9	32.0	13.8
Nørre Nissum	18.0	10.6	13.9	10.7	1.9	1.9	18.5	24.4
Klinkby	19.7	4.1	9.0	9.0	1.7	3.7	23.6	29.1
Ramme	24.8	5.5	7.5	9.0	5.4	4.5	14.7	28.5
Bøvling	8.3	2.2	6.2	5.9	22.2	1.6	20.1	33.5
Tangsø	5.4	1.1	7.8	6.0	28.5	2.5	19.4	29.3
Thyborøn	7.6	0.3	0.7	4.1	0.1	1.8	58.5	27.0
Harboøre	14.6	1.0	2.7	4.9	0.7	1.9	53.1	21.0

== Results ==
Party		Votes	%	+/-	Seats	+/-
Lemvig Municipality
V	Venstre	3,527	30.45	-15.02	6	-5
Æ	Denmark Democrats	2,586	22.33	New	4	New
A	Social Democrats	2,137	18.45	-1.42	4	0
C	Conservatives	1,107	9.56	-3.93	2	-1
F	Green Left	876	7.56	-2.30	1	-1
L	Land- og Bylisten	559	4.83	New	1	New
B	Social Liberals	517	4.46	+1.00	1	0
O	Danish People's Party	273	2.36	-0.67	0	0
Total		11,582	100	N/A	19	N/A
Invalid votes		27	0.18	-0.10		
Blank votes		86	0.56	0.0		
Turnout		11,695	76.57	+3.48		
Source: valg.dk

== Opinion polls ==
Polling firm	Fieldwork date	Sample size	V	A	C	F	B	O	L	Æ	Others	Lead
Epinion	4 Sep - 13 Oct 2025	414	32.9	21.9	5.8	8.4	3.3	4.7	–	19.6	3.5	11.0
2024 european parliament election	9 Jun 2024		26.1	13.3	7.2	13.5	3.2	7.6	–	15.4	–	10.7
2022 general election	1 Nov 2022		25.3	24.4	5.7	5.4	2.0	2.3	–	16.7	–	0.9
2021 regional election	16 Nov 2021		47.3	14.4	4.0	15.7	4.3	2.7	–	–	–	31.6
2021 municipal election	16 Nov 2021		45.5 (11)	19.9 (4)	13.5 (3)	9.9 (2)	3.5 (1)	3.0 (0)	–	–	–	25.6
