= Thorkild Fogde =

Current Danish police commissioner

- Born: July 18, 1965 (age 61); Nørre Nissum, Denmark
- Education: Aarhus University
- Police career
- Department: Police of Denmark
- Branch: Rigspolitiet
- Service years: 1 March 2020 - present
- Rank: National police commissioner
- Badge no.: C0500

Thorkild Fogde (born 18 July 1965) is a Danish police officer and current commissioner of the Danish Police; he became national police commissioner on 1 March 2020, replacing Jens Henrik Højbjerg.

== Early life ==
Fogde has a Master of Law degree from Aarhus Universitet from 1991. He is a former clerk for the Ministry of Justice and the Prime Minister's Office. He also served as a judge in the Court of Roskilde from 1993 to 1994.

== Police career ==
In 2009, Fogde was employed as a Politidirektør in North Zealand's Police and later in 2012 as the Politidirektør for Rigspolitiet. From 2013 to 2017 he was the Politidirektør for Copenhagen's Police.

In April 2017 he became the director for the Danish Prison and Probation Service.

On 24 August 2022, Fogde was relieved from service following the 2020 Danish mink cull, and summoned to official interrogations and disciplinary hearings. He was reinstated as the national police commissioner on 10 February after the preliminary inquiry had completed its official investigation, and concluded that no offence had been committed by him.
