= NSK =

NSK may refer to:

== Arts and media ==
- Neue Slowenische Kunst, a Slovenian art collective
- Japan Newspaper Publishers and Editors Association (Japanese: Nihon Shinbun Kyoka)
- Japan Sumo Association (Japanese: Nihon Sumo Kyokai)
- N. S. Krishnan, Indian comedian in Tamil cinema

== Places ==
- Alykel Airport, Siberia, Russia (IATA:NSK)
- National and University Library Zagreb, Croatia (Croatian: Nacionalna i sveučilišna knjižnica)
- Niihau School of Kekaha, Hawaii, US

== Other uses ==
- NSK Ltd., a Japanese bearing manufacturer
- NSK Trade City, a Malaysian grocery chain
- National Special Crime Unit (Denmark) (Danish: National enhed for Særlig Kriminalitet)
- Nuselský SK, a Czech football club
- Nasjonal Samling Kvinneorganisasjon, women's wing of the Norwegian Nazi party (1934–1945)
