= Corruption in Denmark =

Corruption in Denmark is amongst the lowest in the world.

According to the 2025 Corruption Perceptions Index from Transparency International, Denmark scored 89 on a scale from 0 ("highly corrupt") to 100 ("very clean"). When ranked by score, Denmark held first place among the 182 countries in the Index, where the country or countries ranked first are perceived to have the most honest public sector. Denmark has ranked first (sometimes sharing first rank with other countries with the same score) every year since the current version of the Corruption Perceptions Index was introduced in 2012, except for 2017, when it ranked second. Comparing Denmark's 2025 score with worldwide scores, the average score was 42, and the worst score was 9 (ranked 181, in a two-way tie). For comparison with regional scores, the average score among Western European and European Union countries (Note: Austria, Belgium, Bulgaria, Croatia, Cyprus, Czechia, Denmark, Estonia, Finland, France, Germany, Greece, Hungary, Iceland, Ireland, Italy, Latvia, Lithuania, Luxembourg, Malta, Netherlands, Norway, Poland, Portugal, Romania, Slovakia, Slovenia, Spain, Sweden, Switzerland, and the United Kingdom.) like Denmark was 64, and the worst score was 40. The International Consortium of Investigative Journalists reported in 2014 that Denmark has consistently been in the top-4 since the publication of the first Corruption Perceptions Index report in 1995.

Moreover, Transparency International's Global Corruption Barometer 2013 shows that the public does not consider corruption a major problem in Danish society, and bribes paid to access public benefits and services are virtually non-existent.

The OECD pointed out in 2013, though, that it had "serious concerns about the lack of enforcement" of bribery paid by Danish companies abroad.

== See also ==
- Crime in Denmark
- Danske Bank money laundering scandal
- Peter Brixtofte
