= Lars Findsen =

Danish former civil servant

Lars Johan Findsen
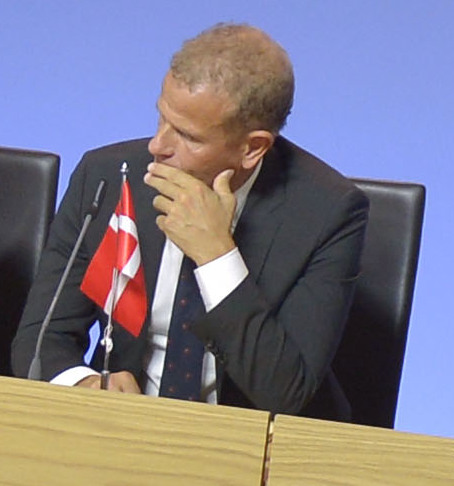
- Lars Findsen in 2015 at a press conference in Norway.
- Born: September 17, 1964 (age 61); England
- Education: University of Copenhagen (Cand. jur.)
- Occupation: Civil servant
- Employer(s): Datatilsynet (1990-1993), Ministry of Justice (1993-2002), Politiets Efterretningstjeneste (2002-2007), Ministry of Defence (2007-2015) and Danish Defense Intelligence Service (2015-2020 (suspended))
- Honours: Knight of the Order of Dannebrog (2003)

Lars Johan Findsen (born 17 September 1964) is a Danish lawyer and former civil servant who served as chief of the Danish Defence Intelligence Service (DDIS) from 2015 to 2020 when he was relieved of duty due to concerns from the regulatory body of the DDIS.

In December 2021, it surfaced that Findsen, along with three other employees of the DDIS and PET, had been arrested and remained in custody on charges of leaking classified information. Findsen was released from custody in February 2022 after a judge ruling, though the Prosecution Service has continued with the case and formally accused Findsen in September 2022. Findsen has denied that he is guilty.

On 1 November 2023 the prosecution dropped their charges against Findsen, along with similar charges against Claus Hjort Frederiksen, after a Supreme Court ruling prevented the trial from being carried out without breaching confidentiality of classified information.

== Education and career ==
Findsen obtained his secondary education at Sønderborg Gymnasium and went on to study law at the University of Copenhagen, where he graduated with a Candidate of Law in 1990. He chose to study law for the sole purpose of becoming a police chief.

Findsen started his career in 1990 working in the Danish Data Surveillance Authority. From 1993 to 2002 he worked various positions in the Ministry of Justice. After leaving the Ministry of Justice and after a brief stint as chief of the civil intelligence agency of Denmark from 2002 to 2007, Findsen became department chief for the Ministry of Defence. He served in this position until 2015 when he was appointed chief of the Danish Defence Intelligence Service.

In 2003 he was made a Knight of the Order of Dannebrog.

== Alleged leaking of state secrets ==
In August 2020 Findsen and two other employees of the DDIS were relieved of their position by then Minister of Defence Trine Bramsen due to concerns from the watchdog of the DDIS over withholding of information. Around a year later, in December 2021, a special commission investigating the concerns acquitted Findsen and the rest of the management of the DDIS of wrongdoing, though Findsen had already been arrested by this time.

Findsen was arrested in December 2021 and charged with leaking classified information under, among others, the rarely-used paragraph 109 of the Danish Penal Code. The paragraph carries a maximum sentence of 12 years. Findsen remained in custody until 17 February 2022. Following his release, Findsen has been subject to extensive surveillance by Danish police, including secret recording of conversations in his home. In September 2022 Findsen was formally accused by the Danish Prosecution Service, indicating they deem there is sufficient evidence for sentencing, of leaking classified information to a total of six people, including two journalists. The exact circumstances of the violations remain unknown and the case will be decided upon behind closed doors.

In October 2022 Findsen and investigative journalist Mette Albæk of Jyllands-Posten released the book Spionchefen: Erindringer fra celle 18 (The spy chief: Memories from cell 18). To avoid potential interference, the book was written in secret, entirely without internet access and with Findsen writing corrections by hand. In the book, former Minister of Defence Trine Bramsen is accused of relieving Findsen for political reasons, and PET is accused of offering Findsen a deal whereby the court would be milder in its judgement in return for Findsen giving up who the press has as sources within PET and for admitting to something, the latter of which has been deemed illegal by several legal experts. PET has denied doing anything illegal and Trine Bramsen has denied acting for political reasons. Findsen has publicly supported Bramsen commenting on his case. Minister of Justice Mattias Tesfaye said he could neither deny nor confirm the allegations presented in the book.

The book, being released during campaigning for the 2022 Danish general election, resulted in an immediate political reaction. A political majority including the Social Democrats, Venstre, The Conservatives, the Red-Green Alliance, Liberal Alliance and Moderaterne have supported the creation of a commission to investigate the case. Although most parties support a commission, they disagree on when the commission should be created. Venstre supports an immediate commission while the Social Democrats support awaiting the judgement of the courts in the case.

On 27 October 2023 the Supreme Court ruled against the prosecution's demand that the charges against Findsen were to not be made public. On 1 November 2023 the prosecution dropped their charges against Findsen, along with similar charges against Claus Hjort Frederiksen, after a Supreme Court ruling prevented the trial from being carried out without breaching confidentiality of classified information.

Findsen announced on 26 August 2024 that he was suing PET and the Ministry of Justice for violations of his privacy and honor.

== Bibliography ==
- Lars Findsen (2014). Danish Defence Policy and Military Operations 2013 (PDF). pp. 40–50. ISBN 978-87-7605-691-9. Wikidata Q110498914.
- Lars Findsen; Mette Mayli Albæk (13 October 2022). Spionchefen: Erindringer fra celle 18 (in Danish). Copenhagen: Politikens Forlag. ISBN 978-87-400-7810-7. OCLC 1348564542. Wikidata Q114650367.

== See also ==
- Danish Defence Intelligence Service
