= Loyal to Familia =

Danish street gang

- Founding location: Nørrebro, Copenhagen
- Years active: 2013 - present
- Territory: Denmark
- Ethnicity: Pakistanis, Turks, Moroccans, Somalis
- Membership: 225 members
- Activities: Terrorism and terror recruitment, drug trafficking, weapons trafficking, contract killing

Loyal to Familia (LTF) is a immigrant criminal network and street gang based in Copenhagen, Denmark.

== Origins ==
Loyal to Familia was established in Nørrebro in 2013. In the summer of 2017, the gang had a membership of 225.

== Prohibition ==
In August 2017, the Minister of Justice Søren Pape Poulsen asked Rigspolitiet and the Attorney General to consider whether there is a basis for dissolution by judgment.

On September 1, 2021, the Danish Supreme Court ruled that Loyal to Familia was unconstitutional because it lacked a legal purpose, and ordered it dissolved. The case was unusual in that it was the first time since 1924 that the Supreme Court had ordered an association dissolved.

== See also ==
- Crime in Denmark
