= Police of Denmark =

National police of the Danish Realm

Danish Police Politiet
- Common name: Politiet (the police)

Agency overview
- Formed: 1919

Jurisdictional structure
- National agency: Kingdom of Denmark
- Operations jurisdiction: Kingdom of Denmark
- Governing body: Rigspolitiet
- General nature: Local civilian police

Operational structure
- Headquarters: Copenhagen Police Headquarters
- Police officers: 11,360
- Civilian Employees: 5.423

Website
- www.politi.dk

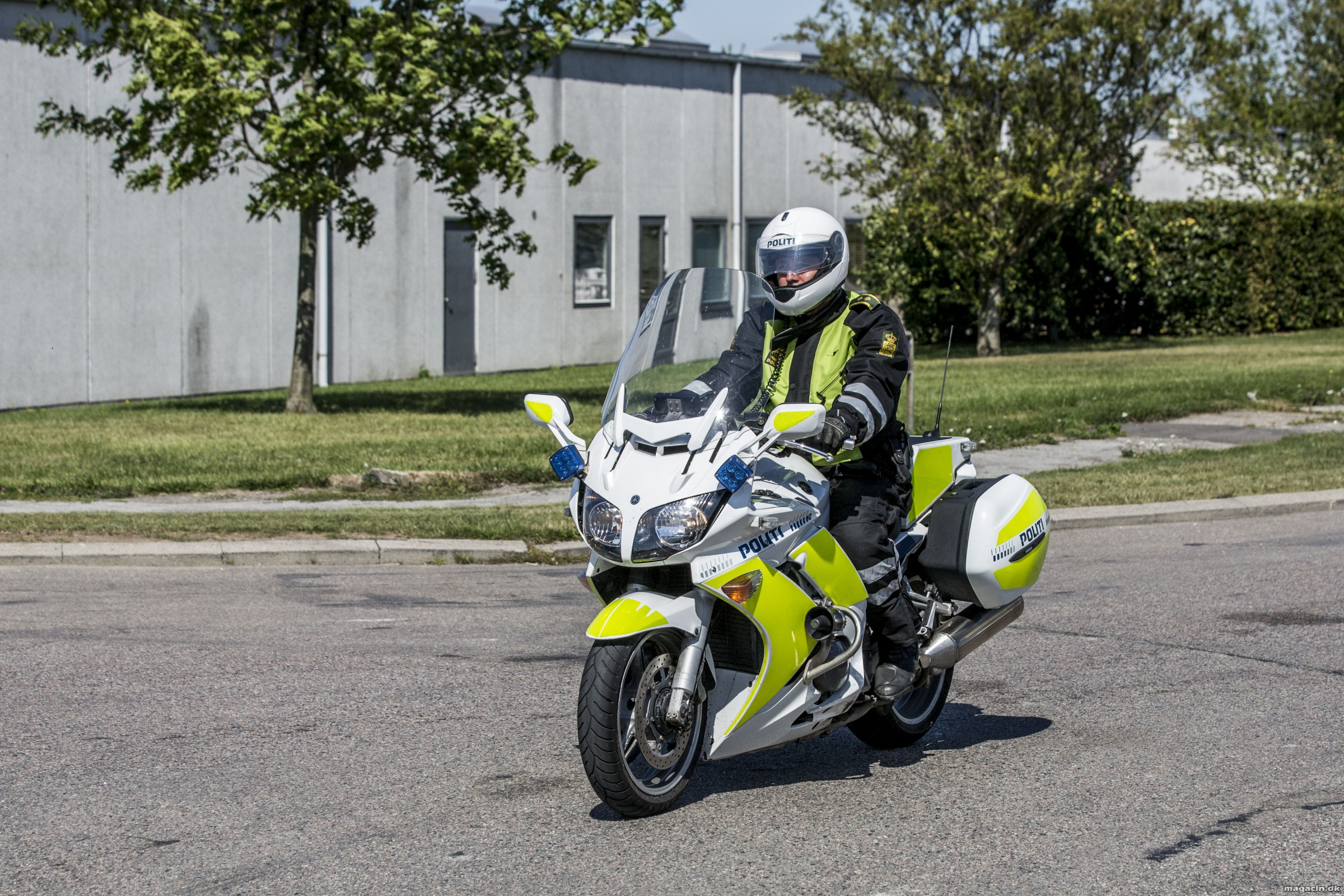
Yamaha Patrol Motorcycle

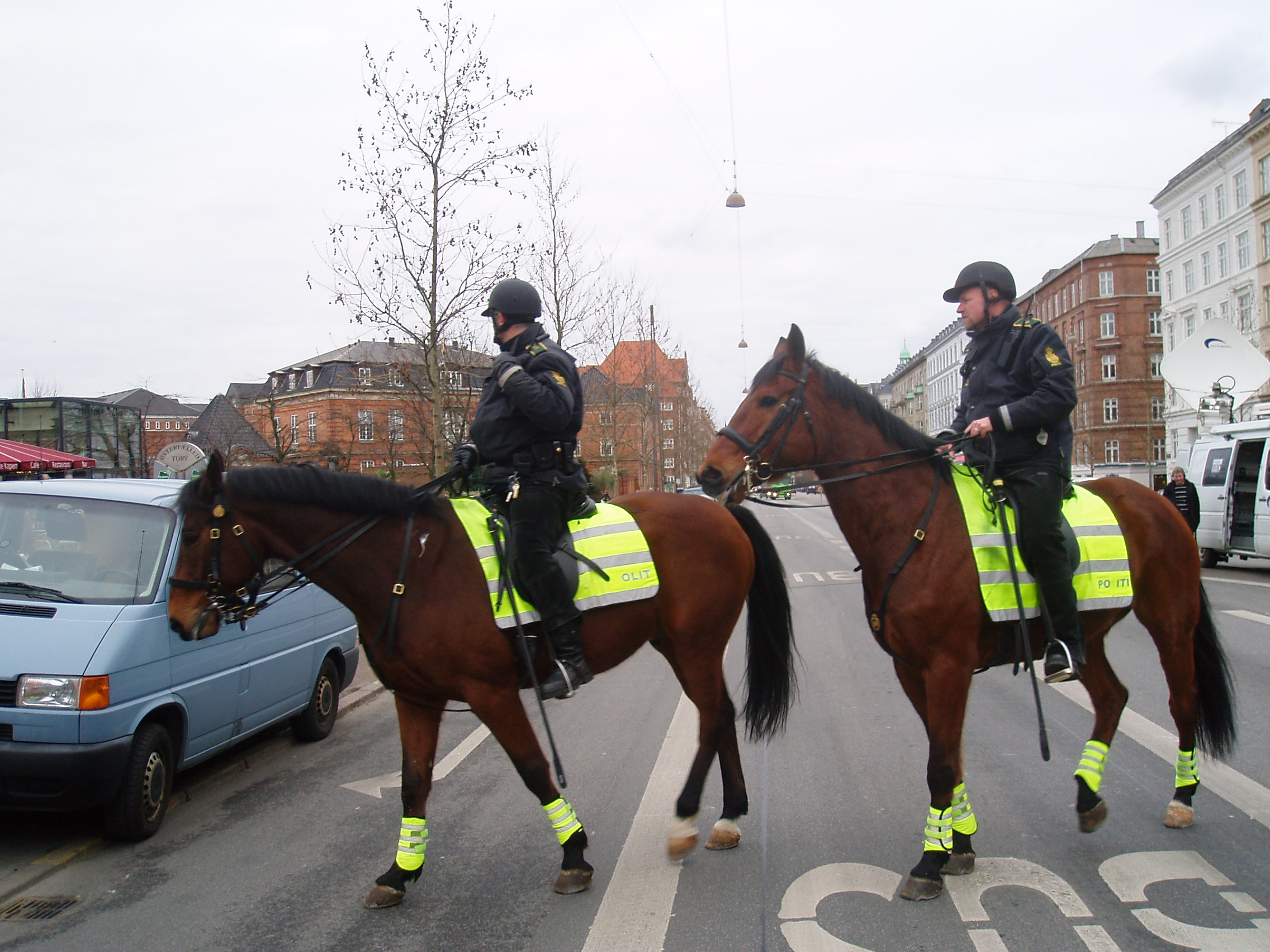
Mounted police officers

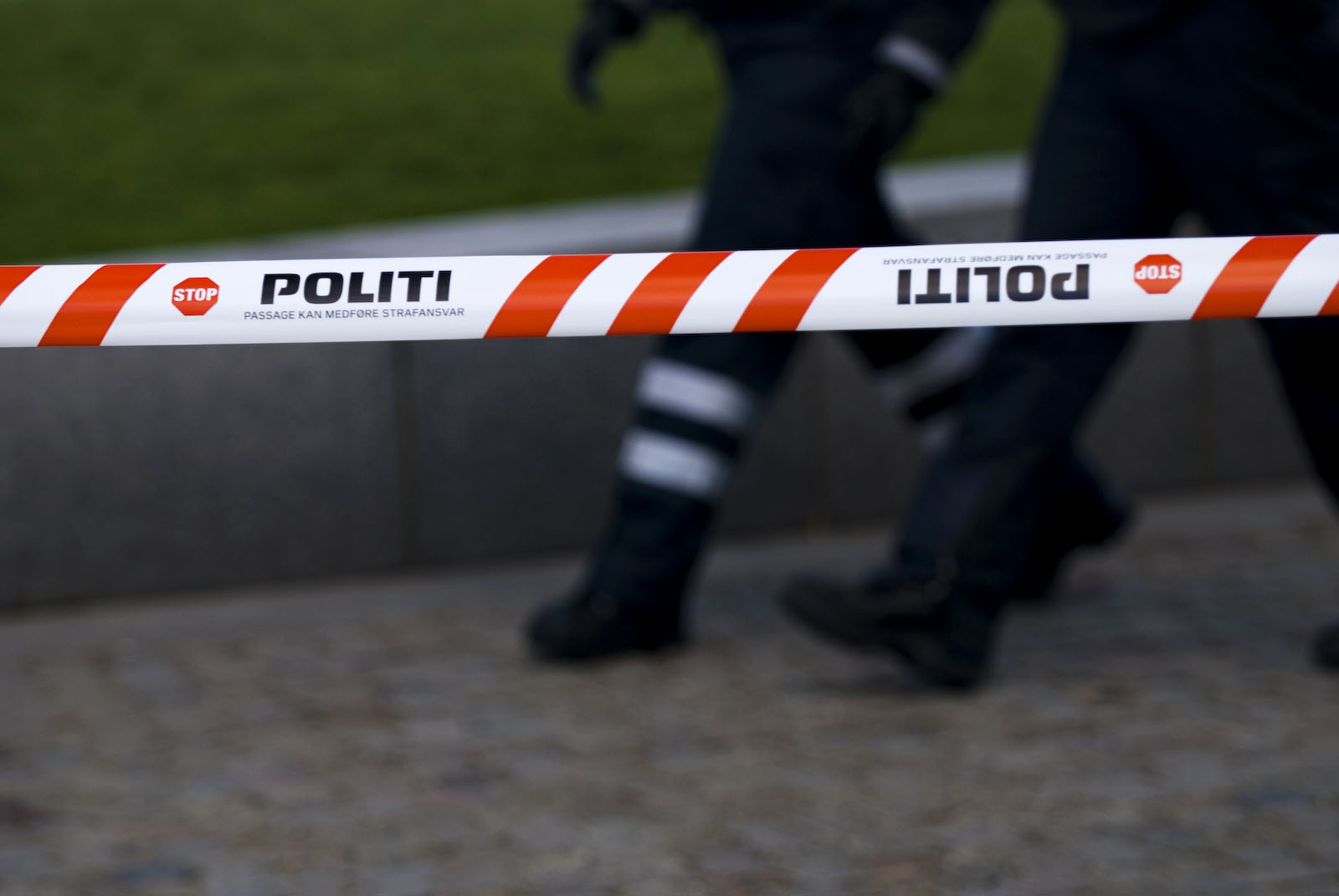
Police line made by caution tape

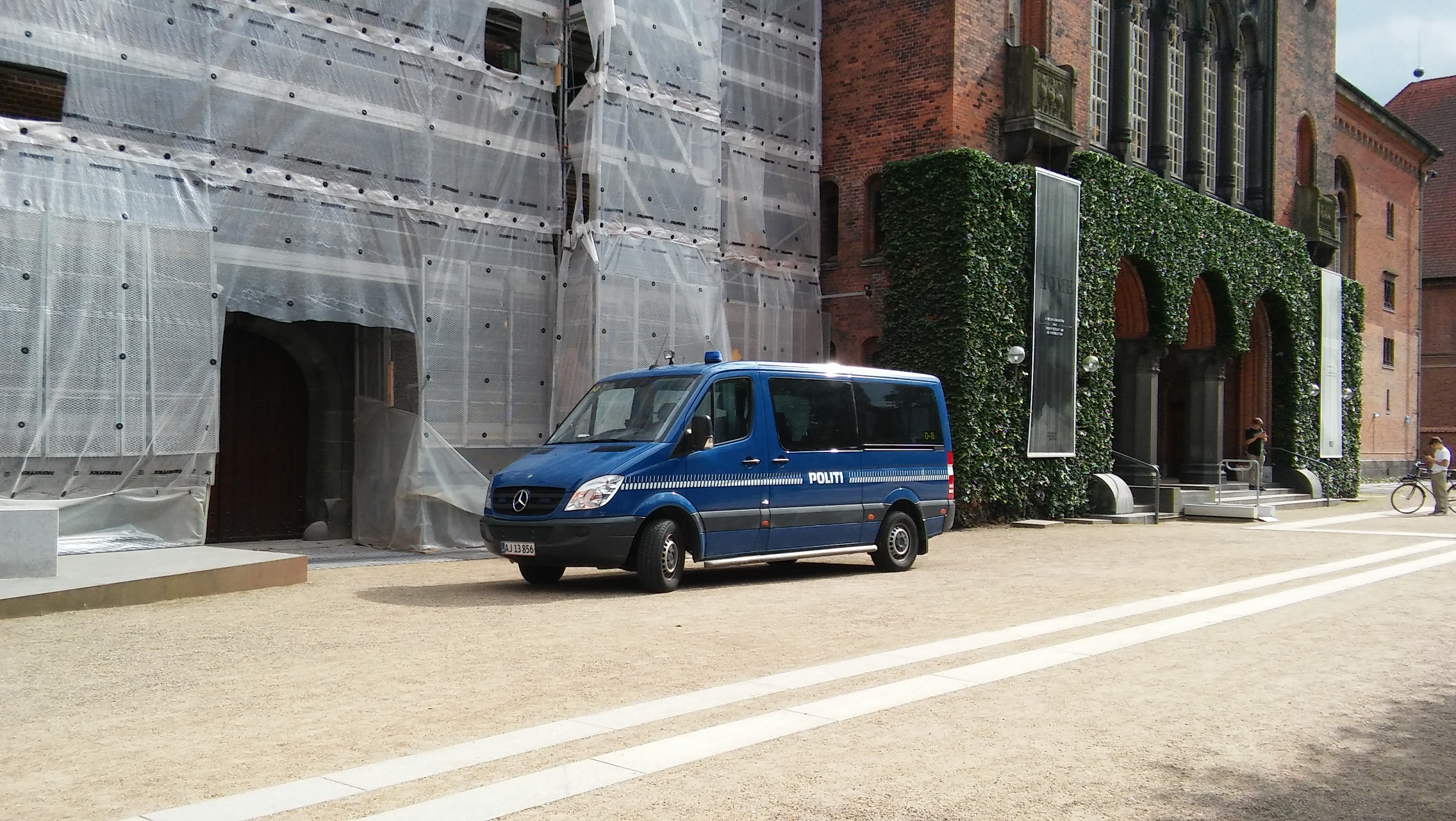
Mercedes Sprinter mini-bus

The Police of Denmark (Danish: Politiet; Faroese: Løgreglan; Greenlandic: Politiit) is the national police force and the internal part of the Danish security forces (the Danish Defence being the external) in the Danish Realm (Denmark proper, Greenland and Faroe Islands). The police are empowered to enforce the law and to effect public and social order, as well as being responsible for border control.

== Organization ==
The police of Denmark consists of 12 districts each managed by a director and two minor districts in Greenland and the Faroe Islands, run by a local chief of police. The district of Copenhagen is somewhat differently organized due to its size and tasks.

Besides the regular districts other organizations exist that work outside the general police:

- Rigspolitiet - a nationwide police force with specialized tasks such as Budgets and Accounts, Building Surveying Department and the Data Investigating Department
- Politiets Efterretningstjeneste (PET) - the national security intelligence agency of Denmark
  - Politiets Aktionsstyrke (AKS) - the special forces unit of the Danish police (operating as a unit under PET)
- National enhed for Særlig Kriminalitet (NSK) - national crime unit that investigates and prosecutes organized, economical and cyber crime.

== Equipment ==
=== Uniform ===
Historically Danish police wore a red uniform until 1863, when it was replaced by dark blue with a crested helmet.

The modern common uniform is a light blue shirt with the police insignia on the sleeve. Usually a tie is also worn. Rank-insignia is worn on the shoulders. The trousers are dark blue with reflective patches. Black shoes are also included in the standard uniform. Special tactical suits are made of flame-resistant materials and are worn in situations requiring such equipment. The tactical suit also includes a protective helmet.

=== Vehicles ===
For daily duties, the patrol-vehicles are white with yellow and green reflective stripes and dog-patrols are mostly dark blue with white stripes. They generally have 3 blue lights and a spotlight on the top. The word "POLITI" painted on the side in clear reflective paint. The most commonly used patrol vehicles are Volvo V90, which is the newest addition for dog patrols, Volkswagen Passat, Mercedes-Benz GLB and Volkswagen Touran, with 2.0 litre engines. Unmarked cars are usually fitted with engines with a size of around 1.6 to 2.2 litres. The unmarked cars is almost identical to the normal fleet. Volkswagen Passat, Volkswagen Touran, and a variety of different Mercedes-Benz models are used. Toyota Landcruiser and VW Touareg are used by the special Romeo unit (or referred to in Danish as Reaktionspatruljen) The vehicles have black tinted and reinforced windows. Small detachments typically use VW Transporters, while Mercedes Sprinter and Ford Transit mini-buses are used in larger operations, which require a lot of manpower (demonstrations, football matches and larger civil unrests). In extreme events, a variation of the MB Vario is used. It is generally known as the Dutchman's vehicle (in Danish Hollændervogn). This name derives from the fact that these vehicles are kitted out in the Netherlands as light APC's with reinforced windows, wheels and metal parts and fire-resistant coating. They are used both as light APCs in event of demonstrations or public disturbances, and as general transportation of large numbers of detainees. Other vehicles in use are the Mercedes-Benz Vito (used by both Central Patrol Leaders, a kind of on-street watch commanders) and Nissan Patrols used by the mounted police squads with a horse carrier attached.

The traffic police also use unmarked vans for automatic traffic control. These are primarily VW Transporters, Mercedes Benz Vitos, Toyota Hiaces, but others are used as well.

Some rural police officers use civilian vehicles with a dismountable magnetic roof beacon.

For traffic regulation and VIP and ambulance escorts motorcycles are also used, primarily Yamaha FJR1300A, Honda ST1300a, and Ducati Multistrada V4S.

=== Weapons ===
The standard service handgun is the H&K USP Compact 9mm pistol. For special tasks the H&K MP5 sub-machine gun is used. Officers are also equipped with batons and pepper spray cans.

In November 2023, it was announced that the Danish Police had adopted the SIG Sauer P320 chambered in 9x19mm, to replace the H&K USP Compact 9mm pistols currently in service.

== Law about police enforcement ==
The operation of Danish police is regulated in the Act on Police Enforcement (da: Lov om politiets virksomhed), commonly known as The Police Act (da: politiloven) of 20 August 2015.

Its first section states that:

"The police must work to ensure security, safety, peace and order in society. The police must promote this purpose through prevention, assistance and enforcement."

The second section states that other areas of police jurisdiction include:

1. preventing criminal actions, disturbances of the public peace and order and danger to individual citizens and public safety
2. stopping criminal actions and investigating and prosecuting criminal actions
3. supporting citizens in dangerous situations
4. carrying out checking and inspecting under current rules and regulations
5. supporting other agencies under current rules and regulations
6. performing other tasks under current rules and regulations, as well as handling other tasks which are naturally associated with police duties.

Lastly, the third section states: "The police may in other situations than those mentioned in statutory law only interfere with citizens under this Act." (Note: Though this may seem obvious, it is a precaution that clearly states that the police may under no circumstances act towards the citizens in ways not stated by law (da: hjemlet). This ensures that the police cannot make their own interpretations of laws or regulations.)

== Ranks and insignia ==
In Denmark, the local prosecution service is part of the police. Since 2014, only chief prosecutors wear uniforms; other prosecutors, such as senior prosecutors, prosecutors, associate prosecutors, and advocates, do not.

Rank	Rank titles	Rank insignia	Personnel category	Commonwealth equivalent
1.	Rigspolitichef		Senior manager	Commissioner
2.	Politidirektør; Direktionsmedlem i Rigspolitiet; Politimester i PET; Politimester i Grønland; Politimester på Færøerne		Senior manager	Deputy Commissioner
3.	Stabschef; Afdelingschef i Rigs- politiet		Senior manager	Assistant Commissioner
3.	Chefanklager		Lawyer	Chief Crown Prosecutor
3.	Chefpolitiinspektør		Police	Chief Superintendent
4.	Vicepolitimester i Grønland; Vicepolitimester på Færøerne; Vicepolitimester i Rigspolitiet; Politiinspektør		Police	Superintendent
5.	Vicepolitiinspektør		Police	Assistant Superintendent
6.	Politikommissær		Police	Inspector
7.	Politiassistent		Police	Sergeant
8.	Politiassistent		Police	Senior Constable
9.	Politibetjent		Police	Police Constable
10.	Politikadet		Police	Student Constable

== Military police ==
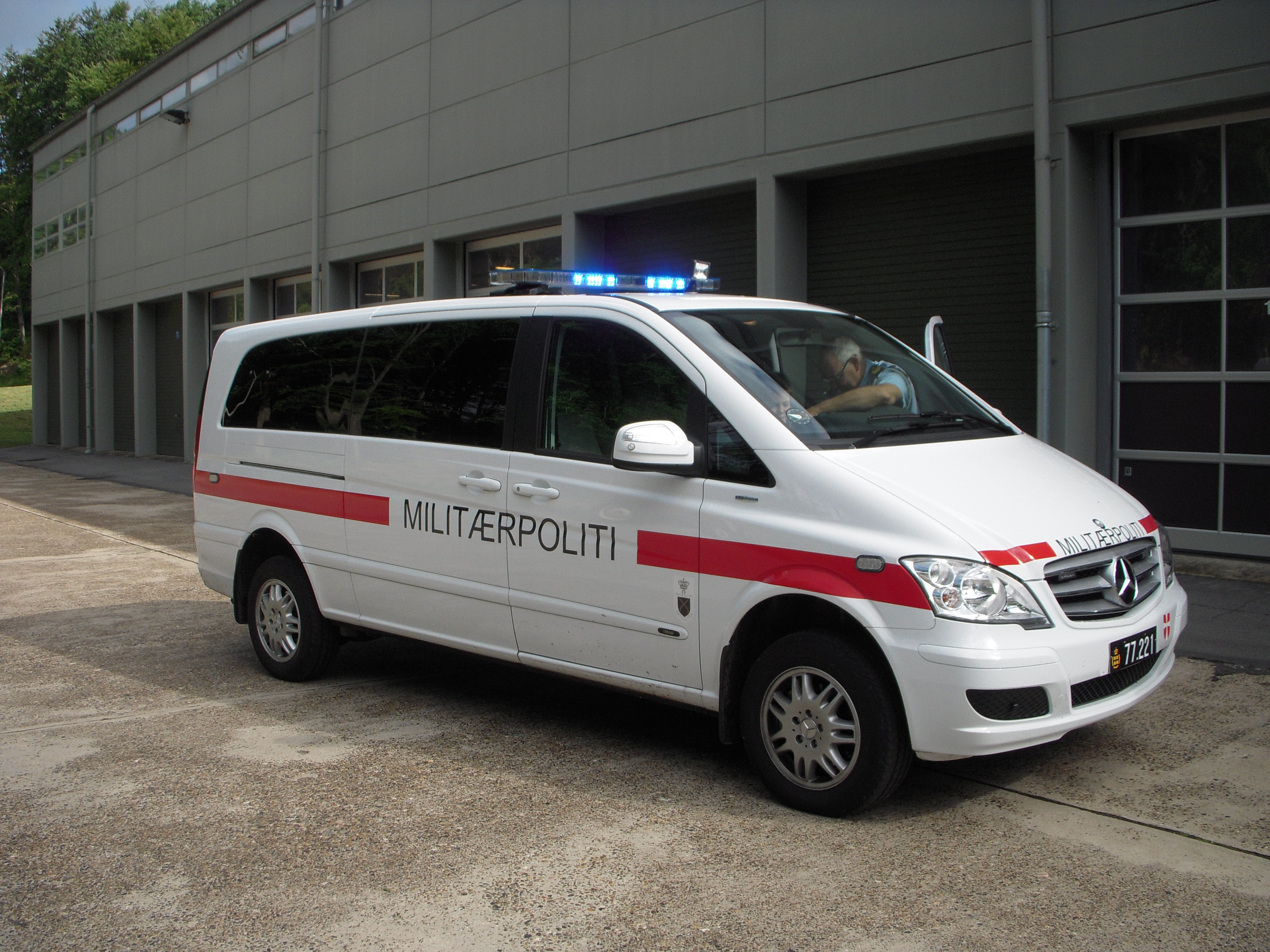
Danish military police

The military police (MP) in Denmark are police units within the armed forces branches. The Danish MP are a joint unit, consisting of members from each branch of the Danish defense forces.

MP personnel typically wear either specific display dress uniforms with white MP shoulder markings or the branch-common daily battle dress uniforms with a red beret.

MP personnel generally do not have any legal jurisdiction over civilians in non-military locations, but only over military personnel and over everyone on military installations (also publicly accessible places such as the Holmen Naval Base in Copenhagen), in the buildings housing the Ministry of Defence, royal palaces (like Amalienborg Palace) and parts of Christiansborg Palace. On some occasions, MP personnel can provide support to the civilian police for certain tasks, but will only have slightly more legal authority than civilians, similar to the police home guard.

== Police Home Guard ==
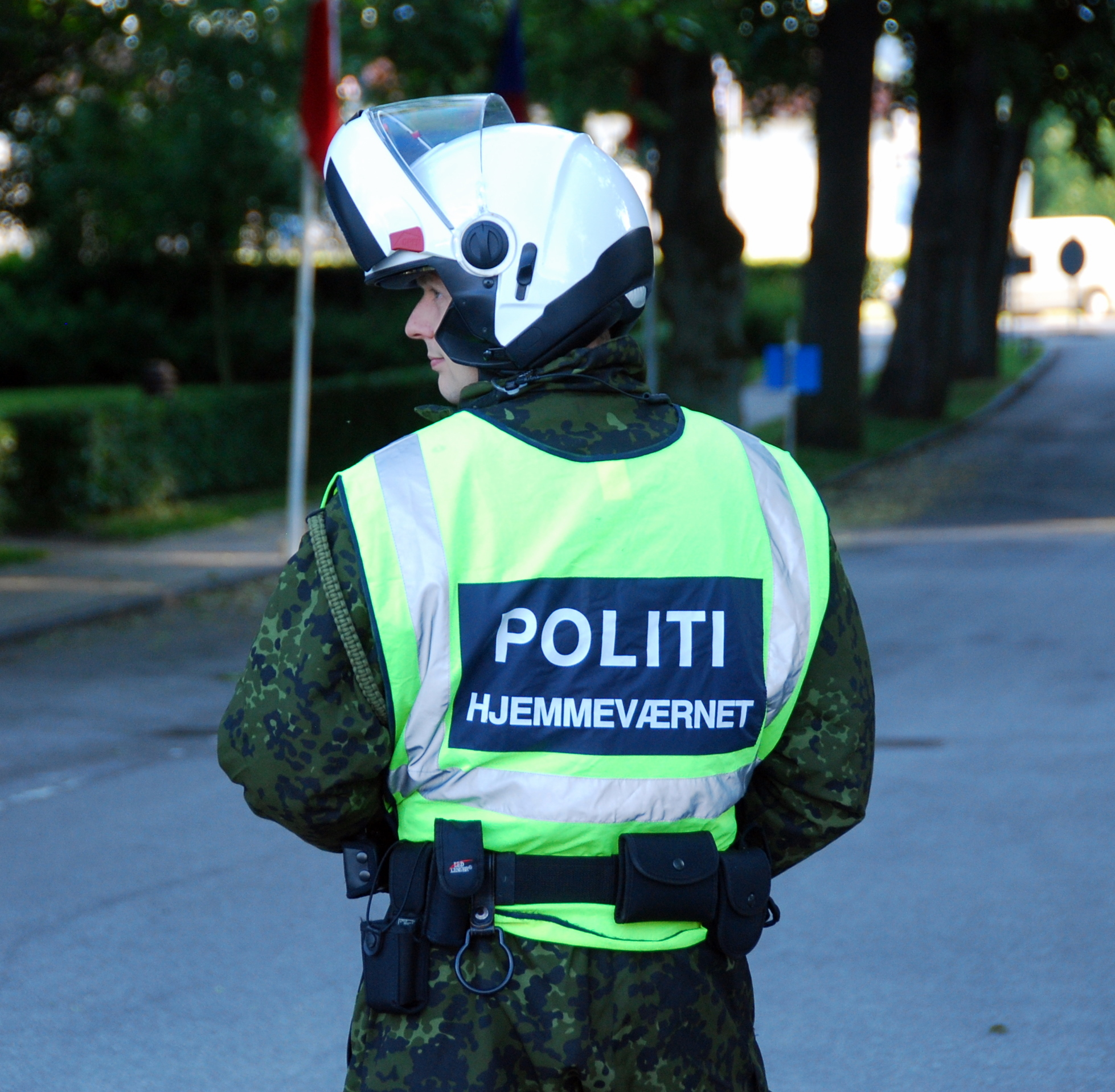
Police Home Guard motorcycle operator.

The Danish police can call upon assistance from a section of the Danish home guard: Politihjemmeværnet the police home guard. The police home guard consists of 47 companies, each led by professional police officers.

The volunteers are mainly used for traffic control at festivals, searches for victims and guarding community installations and are never used in tasks involving direct confrontation with civilians (riot control or planned arrests). These companies are part of the Army Home Guard.

They wear branch-common daily battle dress uniforms, green berets and bright yellow vests with the text "POLITI HJEMMEVÆRNET" (POLICE HOME GUARD).

Members of the police home guard have slightly more legal authority than regular citizens when the service they provide calls for it, but they are always under the supervision of the civilian police.

== See also ==
- Crime in Denmark
