= 2021 Lemvig municipal election =

← 2017	16 November 2021	2025 →

All 21 seats to the Lemvig Municipal Council 11 seats needed for a majority
- Turnout: 11,611 (64.6%) ▼3.1pp
	First party	Second party	Third party
	V	A	C
Party	Venstre	Social Democrats	Conservatives
Last election	12 seats, 48.7%	4 seats, 21.5%	1 seat, 8.0%
Seats won	11	4	3
Seat change	▼1	0	▲2
Popular vote	5,222	2,282	1,549
Percentage	45.5%	19.9%	13.5%
Swing	▼3.2%	▼1.6%	▲5.5%
	Fourth party	Fifth party	Sixth party
	F	B	O
Party	Green Left	Social Liberals	Danish People's Party
Last election	2 seats, 8.8%	1 seat, 4.4%	1 seat, 5.3%
Seats won	2	1	0
Seat change	0	0	▼1
Popular vote	1,133	398	348
Percentage	9.9%	3.5%	3.0%
Swing	▲1.1%	▼0.9%	▼2.3%
Mayor before election
Erik Flyvholm
Venstre
Mayor after election
Erik Flyvholm
Venstre

Since the 2007 municipal reform, Erik Flyvholm from Venstre had been mayor of Lemvig Municipality. The municipality is a fairly strong area for parties of the blue bloc, having been the municipality, where the blue parties had received the 8th highest vote share in the 2019 Danish general elections.

In 3 of the 4 termssince the reform, Venstre had an absolute majority of seats. Despite a small decrease in their vote share for this election, Venstre maintained their absolute majority, by winning 11 of the 21 seats. Erik Flyvholm had therefore no implications as to continue as mayor.

It was later confirmed that Erik Flyvholm would continue for a 4th term as mayor. He also managed to get all parties to support him.

== Electoral system ==
For elections to Danish municipalities, a number varying from 9 to 31 are chosen to be elected to the municipal council. The seats are then allocated using the D'Hondt method and a closed list proportional representation. Lemvig Municipality had 21 seats in 2021

Unlike in Danish General Elections, in elections to municipal councils, electoral alliances are allowed.

== Electoral alliances ==
=== Electoral Alliance 1 ===
Party		Political alignment
I	Liberal Alliance	Centre-right to Right-wing
V	Venstre	Centre-right

=== Electoral Alliance 2 ===
Party		Political alignment
B	Social Liberals	Centre to Centre-left
F	Green Left	Centre-left to Left-wing

=== Electoral Alliance 3 ===
Party		Political alignment
C	Conservatives	Centre-right
O	Danish People's Party	Right-wing to Far-right

== Results by polling station ==
Division	A	B	C	D	F	I	O	V
Division	%	%	%	%	%	%	%	%
Lemvig	26.1	5.0	15.8	3.2	9.3	1.5	2.6	36.5
Nørre Nissum	18.5	5.0	21.4	4.2	13.0	0.4	2.8	34.8
Klinkby	19.3	4.5	11.0	3.3	13.3	0.8	4.5	43.3
Ramme	24.5	3.0	9.7	4.9	16.7	0.7	5.4	35.1
Bøvling	11.4	1.8	8.9	5.9	13.2	1.1	3.3	54.3
Flynder	11.1	0.4	18.4	6.6	7.2	0.7	3.3	52.2
Thyborøn	11.8	0.6	2.2	3.1	2.7	0.5	1.4	77.7
Harboøre	14.4	1.2	11.9	2.9	3.2	0.5	1.9	64.0

== Results ==
Party		Votes	%	+/-	Seats	+/-
Lemvig Municipality
V	Venstre	5,222	45.47	-3.22	11	-1
A	Social Democrats	2,282	19.87	-1.66	4	0
C	Conservatives	1,549	13.49	+5.45	3	+2
F	Green Left	1,133	9.87	+1.11	2	0
D	New Right	447	3.89	+2.79	0	0
B	Social Liberals	398	3.47	-0.94	1	0
O	Danish People's Party	348	3.03	-2.29	0	-1
I	Liberal Alliance	106	0.92	-1.25	0	0
Total		11,485	100	N/A	21	N/A
Invalid votes		44	0.28	+0.07		
Blank votes		82	0.52	+0.07		
Turnout		11,611	73.09	-3.59		
Source: valg.dk
