= Marie Jepsen =

Danish politician (1940–2018)

Marie Jepsen MEP

Member of European Parliament for Denmark
- In office 24 July 1984 – 18 July 1994

Member of the Aarhus City Council
- In office 1984–?

Personal details
- Born: 27 March 1940
- Died: 20 October 2018 (aged 78)
- Party: Conservative People's Party
- Other political affiliations: European Democrats; European People's Party
- Children: 3

Marie Jepsen (27 March 1940 – 20 October 2018) was a Danish politician who served in the European Parliament as a member of the Conservative People's Party from 1984 until 1994.

== Biography ==
Marie Jepsen was born on 27 March 1940 in the town of Nørre Nissum in West Jutland. Following her marriage in 1963, Jepsen moved to the town of Silkeborg, where she worked as a technical assistant. Jepsen was elected to the Silkeborg Town Council in 1978, serving until her election to the Aarhus City Council in 1984.

Jepsen ran for the European Parliament in the 1984 election as a member of the Conservative People's Party. Jepsen, who stated she ran because there were not enough women on the ballot, won election. Jepsen sat as a member of the European Democrats, serving as the group's vice chair from 1988 until 1992. Jepsen sat on various committees throughout her tenure, particularly the Committee on Women's Rights and the Committee on Agriculture. She also served as first deputy leader of the European Free Trade Association commission. Jepsen was re-elected in the 1989 election and served until 1994.

Jepsen died on 20 October 2018 at the age of 78. Jepsen had three children with her husband, who died in 2002.
