= Operation Dunhammer =

Internal investigation by the Danish Defence Intelligence Service

Operation Dunhammer (Danish for Operation Typha) was an internal investigation (Note: The Associated Press first erroneously reported 'Operation Dunhammer' as the name of the espionage operation rather than the investigation.) conducted by the Danish Defence Intelligence Service (Danish: Forsvarets Efterretningstjeneste, FE) which concluded the agency cooperated with the American National Security Agency to wiretap senior politicians, government officials, and government entities of certain European Union countries from 2012 to 2014.

== Report ==
Due to concerns following Edward Snowden's leaking of the NSA's global surveillance operations, the Danish Defence Intelligence Service began the investigation the following year. The investigation ended in 2015, concluding that the NSA collaborated with the FE to eavesdrop on prominent politicians from 2012 to 2014, among them German chancellor Angela Merkel, leader of the opposition Peer Steinbrück, and foreign minister Frank-Walter Steinmeier. This was done through the use of the NSA's XKeyscore computer system, which probed data travelling through underwater internet cables in intercept stations such as Sandagergård, similar to the ECHELON program.

Information about the report was released publicly by a consortium involving DR, Sveriges Television, NRK, Norddeutscher Rundfunk, Westdeutscher Rundfunk, Süddeutsche Zeitung, and Le Monde on 30 May 2021, following an investigation by the aforementioned organisations.

== Aftermath ==
Dunhammer's findings were privately released in 2015, but led to no immediate repercussions among the FE, with collaborations between the FE and NSA continuing as normal. In August 2020, Trine Bramsen who was recently appointed Danish minister of defence in June of the previous year was told of the operation, following which agency head Lars Findsen and three other officials were suspended.

== See also ==
- Crypto AG, company owned by U.S. intel purportedly to spy on other countries
- Dropmire
- Spying on United Nations leaders by United States diplomats
- German Parliamentary Committee investigation of the NSA spying scandal
