= Crime in Denmark =

Crime information by category

Crime in Denmark is combated by the Danish Police and other agencies.

== By type ==
=== Murder ===
In 2018, Denmark had a murder rate of 0.8 per 100,000 population. There were a total of 54 murders in Denmark in 2017.

=== Corruption ===
According to the Corruption Perceptions Index 2024 from Transparency International, Denmark, together with Finland and Singapore, is one of the world's most transparent countries. Transparency International's Global Corruption Barometer 2013 shows that the public does not consider corruption a major problem in Danish society, and bribes paid to access public benefits and services are virtually non-existent.

=== Human trafficking ===
Human trafficking in Denmark is a form of human trafficking that affects both foreign nationals and Danish citizens. Denmark is primarily considered a destination country for victims of trafficking, who are subjected to sexual exploitation, forced labour, criminal exploitation, and other forms of coercion. Between 2020 and 2024, Danish authorities identified approximately 420 trafficking victims, the majority of whom were women and foreign nationals, particularly from non-EU countries. The Danish government combats human trafficking through criminal legislation, victim-support programmes, and national action plans coordinated by the Danish Centre against Human Trafficking.

=== Organised crime ===
The National Police has identified ninety-six criminal organisations operating in Denmark. Motorcycle gangs – such as the Bandidos, Gremium, Hells Angels, No Surrender and Satudarah – and street gangs – including AK81, Black Army, Black Cobra, Black Jackets, Bloodz, Brothas, Loyal to Familia (LTF), United Tribuns and X-Team – are involved in drug sales, extortion, economic crimes (fraud and tax evasion), robbery, and weapons trafficking. Many street gangs have memberships based on a common ethnic or regional origin. The total gang membership in Denmark is approximately 1,400. Additionally, the Albanian mafia and Serbian mafia have a powerful presence in the country, and dominate the trafficking of heroin, weapons and humans.

Rising gang violence in Copenhagen is a dominant theme for public discussion in the media and among political leaders. A gang war in the Nørrebro district of Copenhagen in 2017 culminated in multiple shooting incidents, which resulted in three deaths. From June 2017 through January 2018, police recorded forty-two shootings and four knife attacks, and arrested thirty-six people in connection with these crimes. In 2019, there were thirteen explosions that occurred in the Copenhagen area, all attributed to criminal gang violence. This was in addition to the rising number of gang-related incidents involving firearms and knife attacks over the past several years.

As the only country in the Nordic region with a land border with Western Europe, Denmark is an important transshipment point for narcotics. Law enforcement observes the trafficking of hashish via the large volume of legitimate trucking through Denmark from the Netherlands, Germany, and Spain. Authorities also routinely seize amphetamines, cocaine, and heroin at the ferry crossings from Germany, and during random checks on the bridges from Jutland or Sweden. A majority of the heroin destined for Sweden and Norway transits Denmark. Around half of the heroin entering the country is controlled by the Pakistani mafia and Turkish mafia.

== By location ==
Glostrup, a blue-collar suburb in Copenhagen ranked as the most violent place in Denmark in 2009. The place with the fewest instances of reported violence was Christiansø, a tiny island north east of Bornholm.

=== Copenhagen ===
Crime statistics for Copenhagen in 2011 revealed a 26 percent drop in arrests for violent threats and attacks and a 22 percent drop in drug-related arrests since 2009. Crime statistics revealed a 24 percent rise in reported break-ins and home robberies in the city since 2009.

== By ethnicity ==
At 4%, male migrants aged 15-64 with non-Western backgrounds had twice the conviction rate against the Danish Penal Code in 2018, compared to 2% for native born Danish men. In a given year, about 13% of all male descendants of non-Western migrants aged 17-24 are convicted against the penal code.

== Resumption of border checks ==
On 4 January 2016, Denmark temporarily resumed checks along its borders with Germany and Sweden, previously open under the EU's Schengen zone agreement. The Danish government says the resumption of border checks is needed to help prevent cross-border crime, illegal immigration and drug trafficking.

== See also ==
- Human trafficking in Denmark
- Law enforcement in Denmark
