= Rigspolitiet =

Police agency in Denmark

The National Police Rigspolitiet (Danish)
- Logo of The National Police

Agency overview
- Formed: 1 April 1938; 88 years ago
- Employees: 16,783 employees

Jurisdictional structure
- Area: 43,000 square kilometres (17,000 sq mi) in Denmark, 2,175,000 square kilometres (840,000 sq mi) in Greenland, 1,400 square kilometres (540 sq mi) in other dependencies
- Legal jurisdiction: Kingdom of Denmark: Denmark; Faroe Islands; Greenland

Operational structure
- Headquarters: Polititorvet 14
- Police officers: 11,360
- Civilian employees: 5,423
- Minister responsible: Peter Hummelgaard, Minister of Justice
- Agency executive: Thorkild Fogde, Rigspolitichefen
- Child agency: •Politiområdet •Koncernstyring •Koncern IT •Koncern HR •Politiets Efterretningstjeneste (PET)

Website
- politi.dk/en/danish-national-police

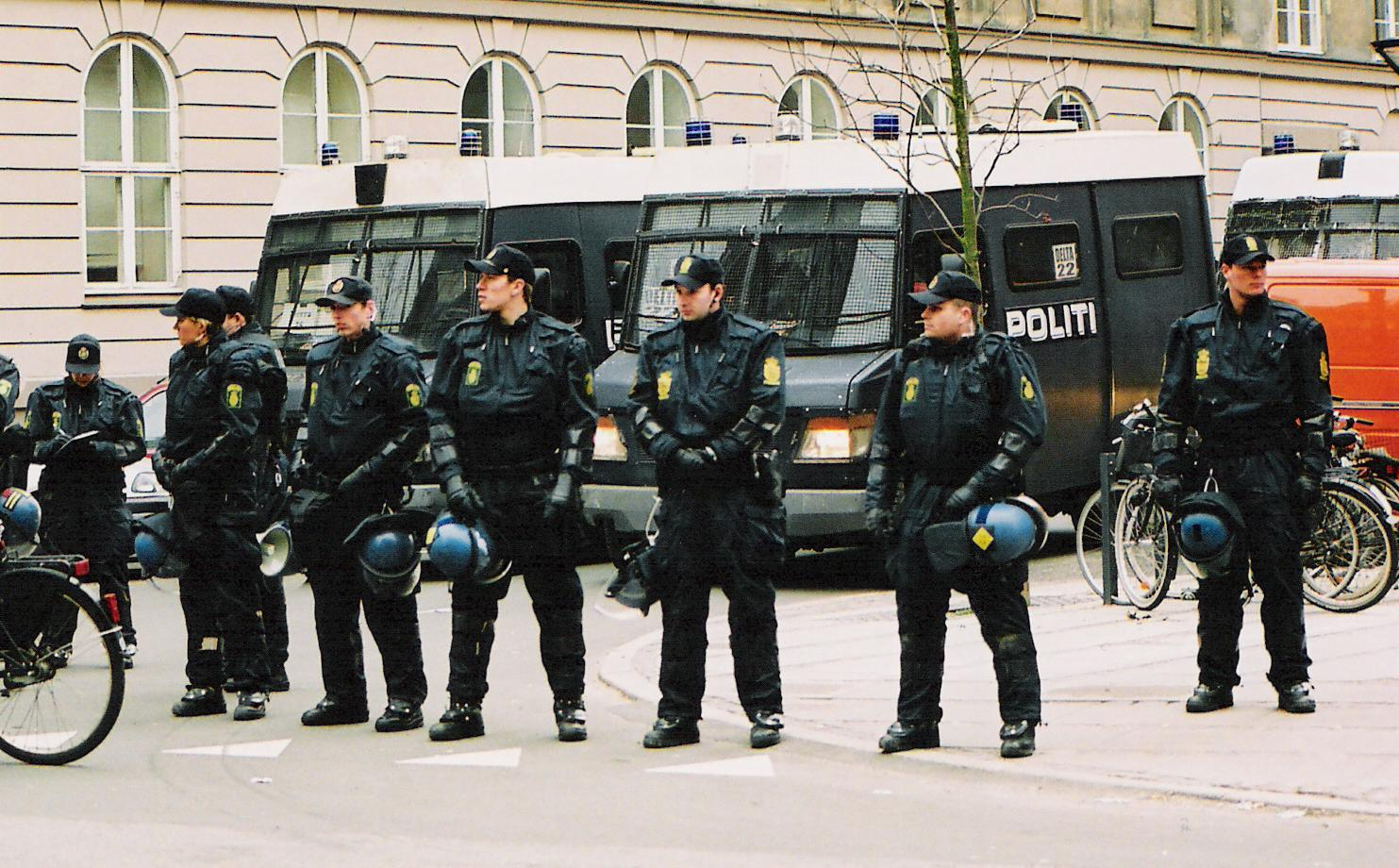
Danish police during the clearance of the Ungdomshuset

The National Police of Denmark (Danish: Rigspolitiet, Faroese: Landløgregla, Greenlandic: Naalagaaffiup Politiivi) is the upper most level of the police of Denmark within the Danish Realm. Administered by a framework of laws dictated by the Folketing (Danish Parliament) and the government's Minister for Justice, Rigspolitiet polices all regions governed by Denmark, including the Faroe Islands and Greenland.

== Organisation ==
=== Leadership ===
Rigspolitiet is controlled by the Minister for Justice via the National Commissioner of Police, who in turn operates above a number of commissioners and departments in the National Commissioner's Office.

These departments include: Budgets and Accounts, the Building Surveying Department, the Data Department, the Traffic Department, Personnel and Recruitment, the Police Department, the Police College, the Aliens Department and the Danish Security Intelligence Service. The National Commissioner is Thorkild Fogde, by permanent appointment effective 1 February 2009.

=== Districts ===
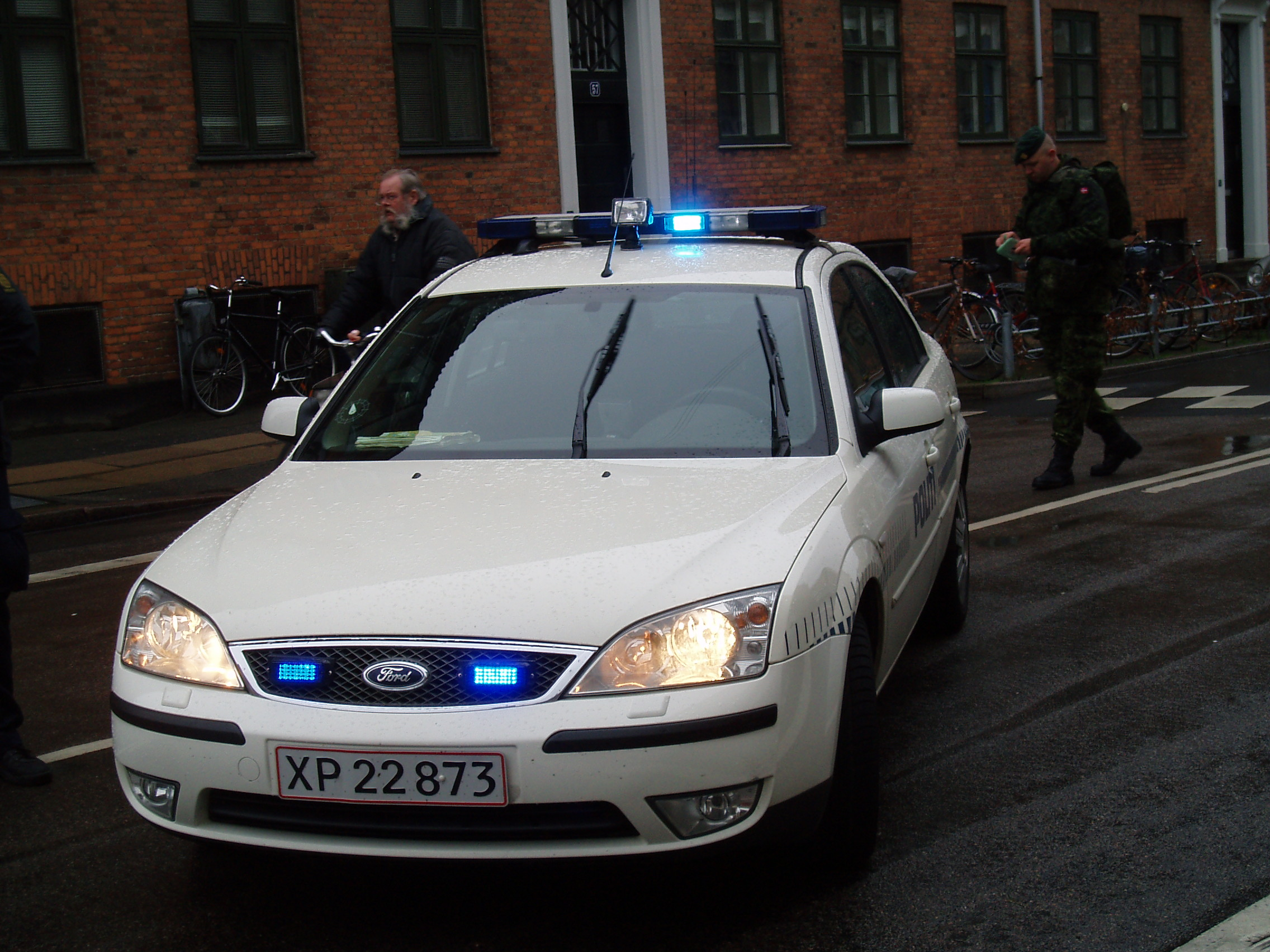
A Ford Mondeo, which was a regular patrol car

The National Commissioner's office also consists of the police commissioners for the twelve police districts of Denmark, and the territories it governs, as well as administrative officers for the community police forces that support the regular units. Each district has one central police headquarters, as well as a number of sub stations, depending on the size of the district.

Each district is headed by a police commissioner who works as part of the National Commissioner's Office, and is supported by various assistant commissioners and chief constables, all of whom are required to have degrees in law. Each district's uniformed sections are headed by a chief superintendent.

The Copenhagen Police department are, due to the size and complexity of the area policed, organised somewhat differently, with three deputy commissioners to assist the main commissioner.

== Duties ==
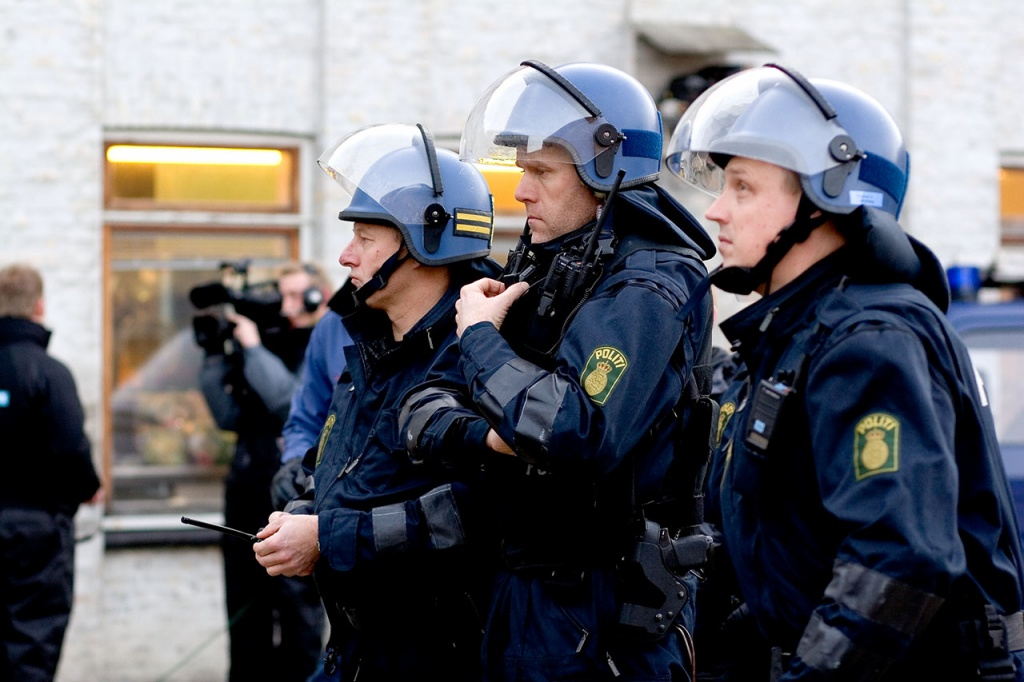
Danish police officers in riot gear

Rigspolitiet are required to perform a number of duties as outlined by the force policy and Denmark's Justice Act and in the Act on Police Activities:

- To prevent criminal offences, breaches of the public peace and order and danger to the safety of individuals and public security;
- To avert any danger of breach of the public peace and order and any danger to the safety of individuals and public security;
- To put an end to criminal activities and to investigate and prosecute criminal offences;
- To assist citizens in other dangerous situations;
- To carry out checks, controls and supervision in accordance with applicable law;
- To assist other authorities in accordance with applicable law; and
- To perform other duties following from applicable law or otherwise naturally associated with police activities.

In addition to law enforcement duties, Rigspolitiet are also tasked with administrative duties, including administering driving tests, weapons licences and vehicle licences as well as issuing police clearance certificates and criminal records.

== Application ==
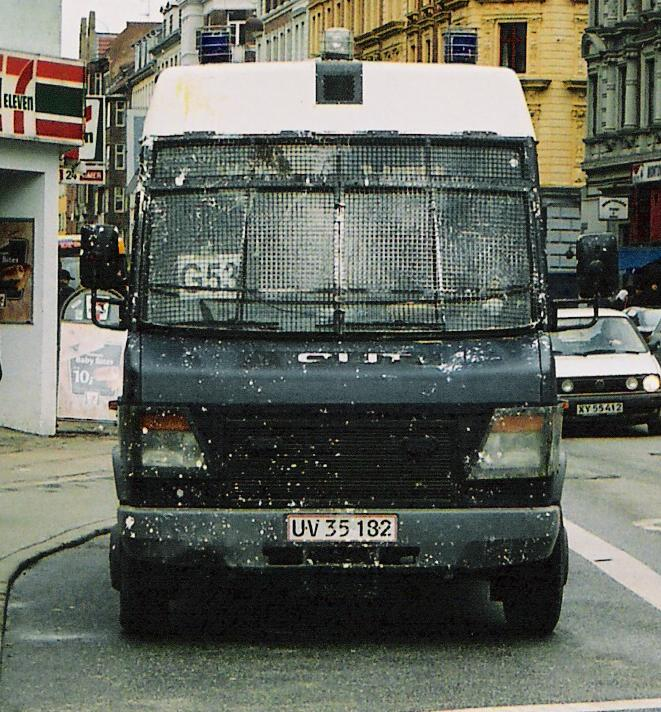
A riot control vehicle from the City of Copenhagen Police

All applicants must be Danish citizens and be over the age of 21, with good health, eyesight and hearing, as well as a qualification in lifesaving or first aid. Police cadets are trained for nine months before they commence duties, followed by eighteen months on the job training while they are carrying out their duties.

This is followed by a second nine-month course, and an examination along with compulsory service with the Support Unit of the Copenhagen Police. Following on from this basic training, Rigspolitiet offer continuous courses throughout an officer's career.

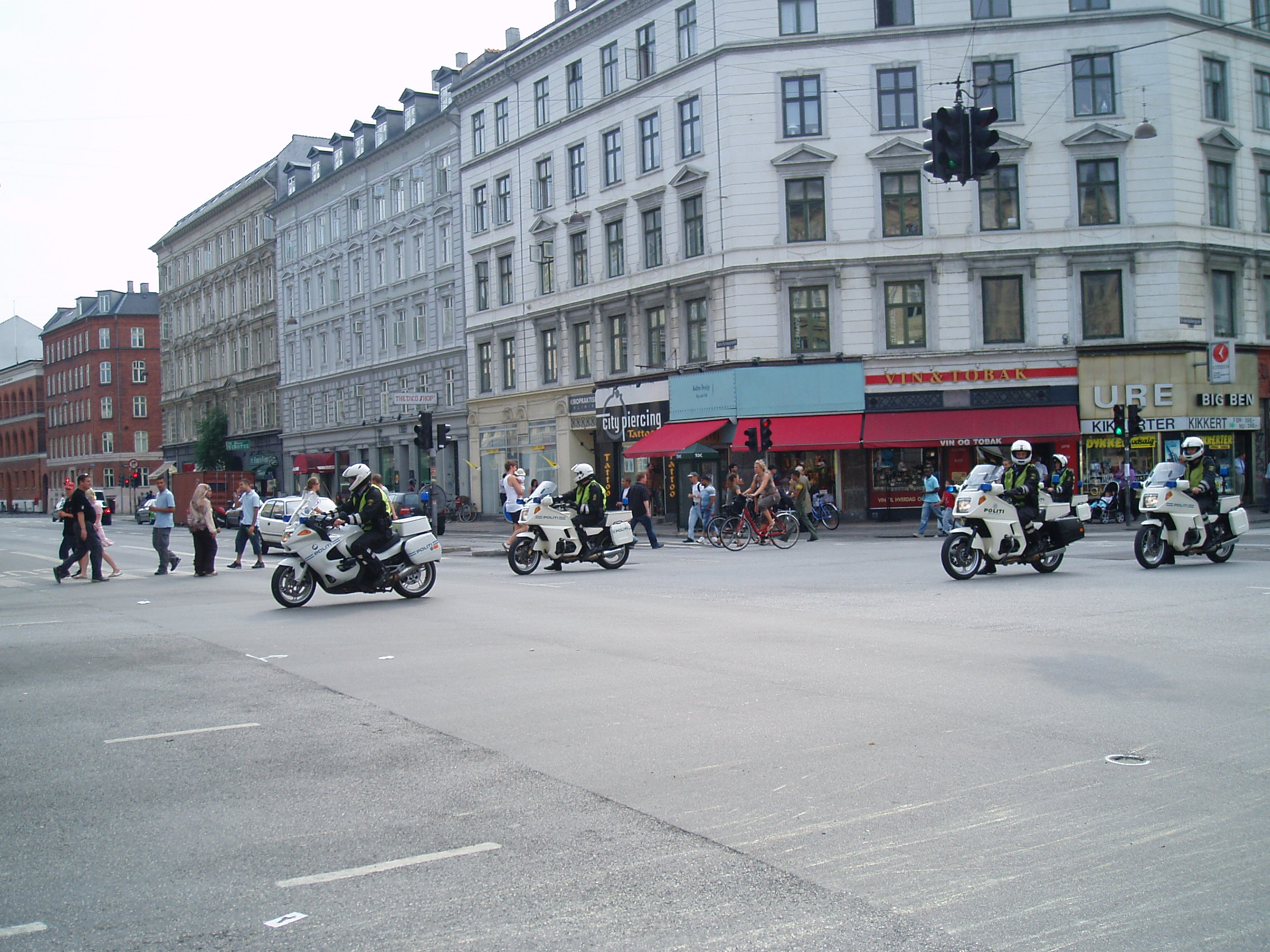
Motorcycles of the Rigspolitiet.

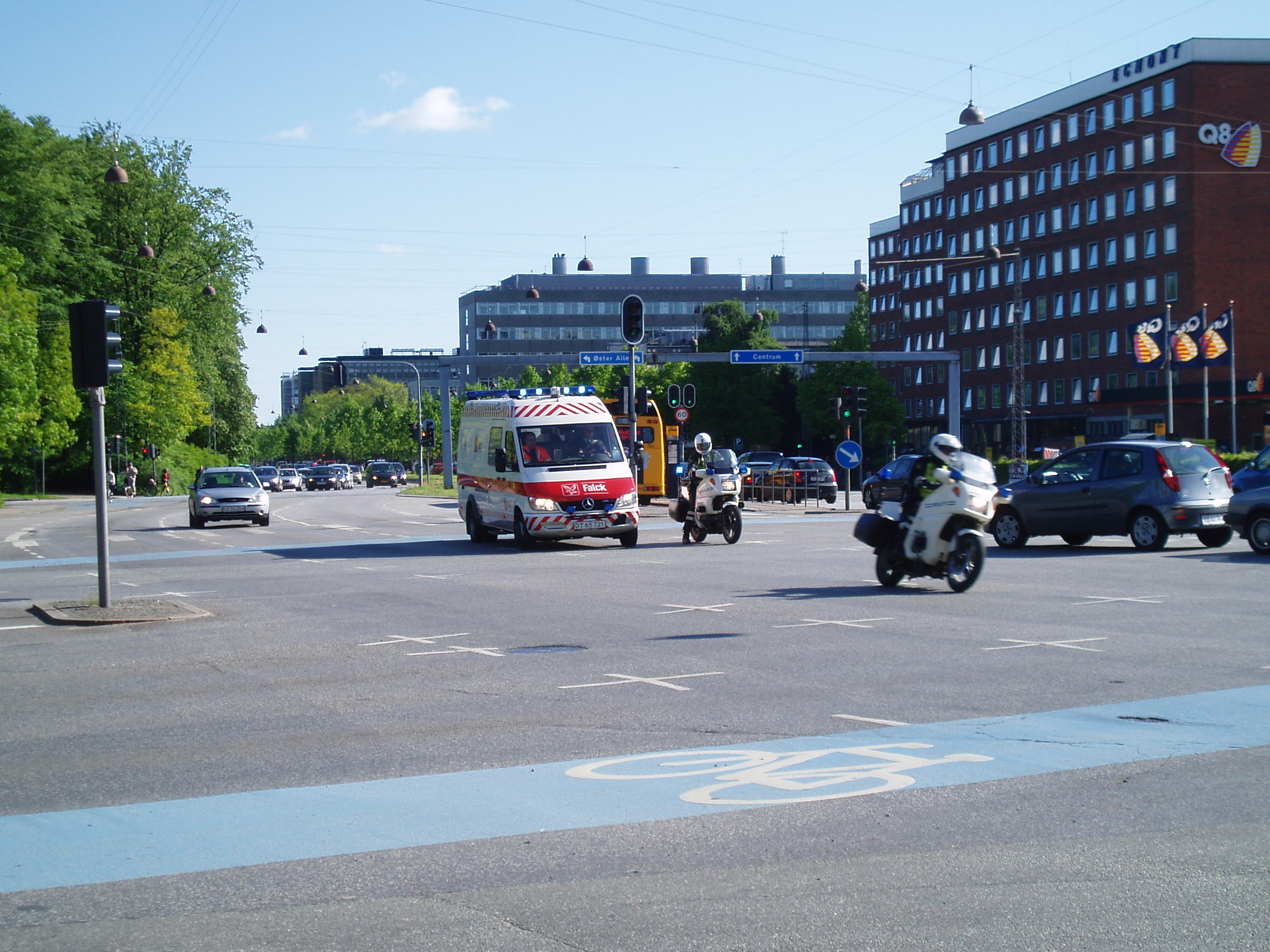
Motorcycles of the Rigspolitiet escorting an ambulance in Copenhagen.

== See also ==
- Politiets Aktionsstyrke
- Politiets Efterretningstjeneste
- Danish Prosecution Service

Crime:

- Crime in Denmark
