= Human trafficking in Denmark =

Human trafficking in Denmark is a form of human trafficking that affects both foreign nationals and Danish citizens. Denmark is primarily considered a destination country for victims of trafficking, who are subjected to sexual exploitation, forced labour, criminal exploitation, and other forms of coercion. Between 2020 and 2024, Danish authorities identified approximately 420 trafficking victims, the majority of whom were women and foreign nationals, particularly from non-EU countries. The Danish government combats human trafficking through criminal legislation, victim-support programmes, and national action plans coordinated by the Danish Centre against Human Trafficking.

== Prosecution ==
Denmark prohibits sex trafficking and labour trafficking under Section 262 of the Danish Criminal Code, which prescribes penalties of up to eight years' imprisonment. These penalties are comparable to those imposed for other serious crimes, such as rape. Sentencing in trafficking cases varies depending on severity and circumstances. The Danish National Police provides anti-trafficking training to police officers and recruits. GRETA has noted improvements in training and victim identification practices, while also highlighting ongoing challenges in ensuring consistent implementation across police districts.

== Protection ==
The Danish authorities conduct both formal and proactive identification of potential trafficking victims, including outreach in prostitution environments, asylum centres, and detention facilities. Identified victims are offered a reflection period during which they receive accommodation and access to medical, psychological, and legal assistance while considering whether to cooperate with law enforcement.

Non-governmental organisations have reported that victims often require more time than the reflection period allows to build trust with authorities and disclose their experiences. Concerns have also been raised that some foreign victims may face return to their country of origin after the conclusion of support measures if they are not granted residence permits, although victims may apply for asylum or other forms of protection depending on their circumstances.

== Prevention ==
Denmark implements anti-trafficking prevention measures through national action plans, public awareness initiatives, and international cooperation. Prevention efforts have included campaigns aimed at reducing demand for commercial sex acts, as well as outreach activities conducted in cooperation with non-governmental organisations and other stakeholders.

The government has also supported anti-trafficking programmes internationally, particularly in Eastern Europe, and cooperates with NGOs and other partners to raise awareness of trafficking and child sexual exploitation. Hotlines are available for potential victims and for reporting suspected trafficking cases, including child sex tourism abroad. The Ministry of Defence provides training on human trafficking to personnel prior to deployment on international missions.

== International response ==
The United States Department of State placed the country in "Tier 2" in their 2020 Trafficking in Persons Report. Denmark was back to Tier 1 in 2023.

The 2021 GRETA report noted that between 2016 and 2019, 380 survivors were identified (8% of whom were children).

Denmark ratified the 2000 UN TIP Protocol in September 2003.
