= National police commissioner (Denmark) =

- Rigspolitichefen (Danish)
- Rank insignia
- Incumbent; Thorkild Fogde since 1 March 2020
- Rigspolitiet
- Reports to: Minister of Justice
- Nominator: Government of Denmark
- Appointer: the Monarch
- Formation: 1 April 1938
- First holder: Eigil Thune Jacobsen
- Website: Official website (in Danish)

The National Police Commissioner of Denmark (Danish: Rigspolitichefen) is the head of the Rigspolitiet, responsible for all activities of the police. The current Commissioner is Thorkild Fogde, he was sent home following the Mink scandal but returned to office following an investigation.

== List of officeholders ==
- Acting

No.	Portrait	Name (born–died)	Term of office			Ref.
No.	Portrait	Name (born–died)	Took office	Left office	Time in office	Ref.
1		Eigil Thune Jacobsen (1880–1949)	1 April 1938	9 July 1941	3 years, 99 days	
–		Knud Begtrup-Hansen (1882–1967)	9 July 1941	1949	7–8 years	
2		Knud Begtrup-Hansen (1882–1967)	1949	1952	2–3 years	
–		Svend Erling Heide-Jørgensen (1910–2002)	1 September 1952	1 July 1954	1 year, 303 days	
3		Svend Erling Heide-Jørgensen (1910–2002)	1 July 1954	1 October 1980	26 years, 92 days	
4		Ivar Boye (born 1929)	1 October 1980	31 December 1999	19 years, 91 days	
5		Torsten Hesselbjerg (born 1950)	1 January 2000	31 December 2008	8 years, 365 days	
–		Jens Henrik Højbjerg (born 1955)	1 January 2009	1 February 2009	31 days	
6		Jens Henrik Højbjerg (born 1955)	1 February 2009	1 March 2020	11 years, 29 days	
7		Thorkild Fogde (born 1965)	1 March 2020	24 August 2022	2 years, 176 days	
–		Lene Frank (born 1961) acting	24 August 2022	10 February 2023	170 days	
7		Thorkild Fogde (born 1965)	10 February 2023	Incumbent	3 years, 209 days	
