= National Special Crime Unit (Denmark) =

National Special Crime Unit National enhed for Særlig Kriminalitet

Agency overview
- Employees: Approximately 800 employees

Jurisdictional structure
- Area: 43,000 square kilometres (17,000 sq mi) in Denmark, 2,175,000 square kilometres (840,000 sq mi) in Greenland, 1,400 square kilometres (540 sq mi) in other dependencies
- Legal jurisdiction: Kingdom of Denmark: Denmark; Faroe Islands; Greenland

Operational structure
- Headquarters: Ejby Industrivej 125-135; 2600 Glostrup
- Agency executive: Lasse Boje Nielsen, Director of Police

Website
- politi.dk/en/about-the-police/national-special-crime-unit

The National Special Crime Unit (Danish: National enhed for Særlig Kriminalitet (NSK)) is a unit that is part of the Danish police.

The unit works with investigation and prosecution of organized crime, financial crime and cybercrime. It is organized as a nationwide police district and consists of a police division, a prosecution division, an administration division and the Danish Financial Intelligence Unit.

== History ==
In 2020 the Danish Minister for Justice, Nick Hækkerup, announced plans to create a national police unit that could handle the most complicated types of crime and said he "dreamed of a Danish version of the FBI."

The bill establishing the unit was submitted for public consultation by the Ministry of Justice on 17 August 2021. The bill was subsequently presented in the Folketing on 6 October 2021 and adopted on 16 December 2021 with 100 votes in favor and 2 against. 0 voted neither in favour nor against.

The National Special Crime Unit opened 1 January 2022 and is a merger of Special Investigation West, Special Investigation East, the Nationwide Center for IT-related Economic Crime, the Border Center Øresund, the National Forensic Science Center, the National Cyber Crime Center as well as parts of the National Investigation Center and the Public Prosecutor for Economic and International Crime.
