= Politiets Aktionsstyrke =

Danish Police tactical unit handling crises and terrorism

Special Intervention Unit
- Politiets Aktionsstyrke (Danish)
- Patch worn by Politiets Aktionsstyrke
- Active: 1973 - present
- Country: Denmark
- Agency: National Police
- Type: Police tactical unit
- Role: Counter-terrorism; Law enforcement
- Abbreviation: AKS

Structure
- Operators: 100

The Politiets Aktionsstyrke (AKS, English: Special Intervention Unit) is the police tactical unit of the Danish National Police.

== History ==
The unit's operational functions are closely guarded secrets, so not much is known. What has been published is that the unit was created just after the Munich Summer Olympic incident in 1972.

In 1998, the unit was re-organized to include a permanent force of roughly 100 police officers; it previously "borrowed" officers from regular units on an as needed basis.

AKS led the operation of clearing and evicting the anarchist and leftist groups from Ungdomshuset on March 1, 2007.

An officer from AKS was seriously wounded on January 7, 2013, during an arrest operation against three suspected narcotics smugglers. The suspected perpetrator was killed by a headshot and another man was wounded. A third man was arrested. It was the first time that an AKS-officer had been wounded during an operation.

== Organization ==
=== Training ===
Their training includes: tactical shooting, hand-to-hand combat, surveillance, and explosives.

Policemen who want to join the unit are required to take and pass selection tests. It is known that AKS cross-trains with the army and navy elite-units Jægerkorpset and Frømandskorpset.

=== Duties ===
It is meant to handle extraordinarily difficult or life-threatening criminal situations, such as terrorism, hostage situations, and kidnapping. It also deals with emergency rescue situations that would be too dangerous for others to handle.

The AKS holds responsibility for all anti-terror and counter-terrorism missions in Denmark. Its activities are under the jurisdiction of the Danish Security and Intelligence Service (PET) while the Danish Ministry of Justice supervises the AKS.

== Equipment ==
Model	Origin	Type
Heckler & Koch USP Compact	Germany	Semi-automatic pistol
Heckler & Koch MP5	Germany	Submachine gun
Colt Canada C8	Canada	Assault rifle
Heckler & Koch G36C	Germany	Assault rifle
SIG MCX	United States	Assault rifle
Sako TRG	Finland	Sniper rifle
Lenco BearCat	United States	Vehicle
