= Nørre Nissum =

- Town
- Location in Central Denmark Region Nørre Nissum (Denmark)
- Coordinates: 56.54950°N 8.41789°E
- Country: Denmark
- Region: Central Denmark Region
- Municipality: Lemvig Municipality

Area
  - Urban: 1.09 km^{2} (0.42 sq mi)

Population (2026)
  - Urban: 990
  - Urban density: 910/km^{2} (2,400/sq mi)
- Time zone: UTC+1 (CET)
  - Summer (DST): UTC+2 (CEST)
- Postal code: DK-7620 Lemvig

Nørre Nissum is a village situated in western Jutland, Denmark with a population of 990 (1 January 2026). The nearest major town is Lemvig, with a population of about 7000. This village has Denmark's smallest teachers training college: Nørre Nissum Seminarium and HF.

== Notable people ==
- Thorkild Fogde (born 18 July 1965) a Danish police officer and current Rigspolitichef
- Aage Kirkegaard (1914 in Nørre Nissum – 1992) a Danish field hockey player who competed in the 1936 Summer Olympics
- Marie Jepsen (1940–2018), member of the European Parliament
- Ellen Trane Nørby (born 1980) a Danish politician
