= Danish Defence Intelligence Service =

Danish foreign intelligence organization

Coordinates: 55°41′28″N 12°35′38″E

- Forsvarets Efterretningstjeneste
- Logo

Agency overview
- Formed: 1 October 1950; 76 years ago
- Jurisdiction: Government of Denmark
- Headquarters: Copenhagen, Denmark
- Annual budget: 975 million kr. (2019)
- Minister responsible: Jeppe Bruus (S), Minister of Defence
- Agency executive: Svend Larsen
- Parent Agency: Ministry of Defence
- Website: fe-ddis.dk

The Danish Defence Intelligence Service (DDIS; Danish: Forsvarets Efterretningstjeneste, FE) is a Danish intelligence agency, responsible for Denmark's foreign intelligence, as well as being the Danish military intelligence service. DDIS is an agency under the Ministry of Defence and works under the responsibility of the Minister of Defence. It is housed at Kastellet, Copenhagen.

The DDIS gathers, analyses, and disseminates information concerning conditions of importance to Denmark's security, and to the security of Danish military units deployed on international missions. Intelligence activities include collection of information of political, financial, scientific and military interest.

DDIS works closely with the Danish Security and Intelligence Service, which is the intelligence arm of the Danish police, and the signals intelligence unit of the Intelligence Regiment.

== History ==
Hans Lunding, first chief of a combined intelligence service, 1950–1963

The current name and basic organization dates from 1 October 1967, when Defence Staff's Intelligence Department (Danish: Forsvarsstabens Efterretningsafdeling), was detached from Defence Staff (Danish: Forsvarsstaben) by decree of the Ministry of Defence, as a separate authority of its own, located directly under the Ministry of Defence.

The origin can be traced back to the General Staff's Intelligence Section (Danish: Generalstabens Efterretningssektion) created 1911 and the Naval Staff's Intelligence Section (Danish: Marinestabens Efterretningssektion) created 1920s & served in World War I & II. During the reconstruction of the Danish military following Denmark's joining of NATO, these two intelligence services were merged on 1 October 1950, as Defence Staff's Intelligence Section as a department under the newly erected combined military staff, the Defence Staff.

The origin of the Danish military intelligence is uncertain. 1911 appears in one of the few histories of the Danish military intelligence. However 1903 has also been suggested as the year of the establishment of the military intelligence.

During the Cold War, the military intelligence as well as the intelligence section of the police spied against and recorded the activities of the Danish left wing, communists and pacifists, among the later organisations and personalities in the Danish chapter of the War Resisters' International, the Danish Campaign against Nuclear Weapons and the Conscientious Objectors' Union. This is documented in the Danish Judge Advocate General's Corps: Report on the occasion of the examination by the Judge Advocates of certain matters related to Defence Intelligence Service and Conscientious Objectors' Union etc. in the period 1970-1978 (1999).

In August 2020 Lars Findsen was relieved of duty "for the time being" and two other employees were also suspended after it was revealed the intelligence agency had broken laws and misled the intelligence watchdog. The agency had been spying on Danish citizens from 2014 to 2020. An investigation was launched after whistleblowers handed over information. The agency is accused of failing to investigate espionage in the armed services and of obtaining and passing on information about Danish citizens. The agency is also accused of concealing offences and failing to inform the intelligence agency watchdog. In December 2021, Findsen and three others were arrested and charged with leaking top secret information. On 13 December 2021, five days after Findsen's arrest a commission tasked with investigating the allegations leading to the suspensions cleared the intelligence agency and its employees of any wrongdoing.

Defence minister Trine Bramsen said an investigation would be launched into the claims. She said the investigation would be carried out "the utmost seriousness" and "It is important for me to emphasise that the fight against the threats against Denmark must not stop while the investigation is carried out". Kaspar Wester of Danish news site OLFI said to BBC: "The supervisory agency suggests that Lars Findsen has played an active part in withholding information or even deliberately misinforming the supervisory agency. The fact that the head of the Danish Military Intelligence Service is a willing participant in circumventing the agency tasked with holding his own intelligence service legally accountable is mind-blowing and must be deeply concerning to the minister." Wester said the investigation would aim to discover how the scandal had happened and how long it had gone on for.

In May 2021, it was reported that DDIS collaborated with National Security Agency (NSA) to wiretap on fellow EU members and leaders, leading to wide backlash among EU countries and demands for explanation from Danish and American governments. As of August 2022 two of those charged had their charges dismissed, while Findsen remains charged and suspended.

== Organisation ==
- Executive Office
  - Collection & Operations
  - Analysis
  - Development and Resources
  - Centre for Cyber Security

== Stations ==
=== Sandagergård station ===
The Sandagergård station near Copenhagen is an electronic reconnaissance base of FE to monitor data-based communication. Communication via submarine cables and other wires is evaluated here. It was part of the Echelon network and the FE/NSA Operation Dunhammer.

Another SIGINT post is located in Skibsbylejren near Hjørring in Jutland. There were also connections to the former Allied Command Baltic Approaches, the regional NATO command for the Baltic region at the Karup military base.

=== Bornholm radar station ===
The Bornholm radar station (Flyradarstation Bornholm (FRS Bornholm) and Flyverdetachment Bornholm (FLD Bornholm) is officially operated by the Danish Armed Forces Flyvevåbnet on the Baltic Sea island for air surveillance. The S-723 radar is a 3D reconnaissance radar system with a range of 500 km.

== Supervision and oversight ==
Four organizations, independent of each other, do various auditing of FE for unauthorised conduct.

The service is directly responsible to the Defence Minister, which on behalf of the Government of Denmark supervises the overall actives and conduct of the service. The DDIS is, as Danish Security Intelligence Service is, subject to regularly control by the TET which is controlled by the Ministry of Justice. It is also subject to Folketingets control committee, which was established by law no. 378 of July 6, 1988. And finally, as all Danish government agencies, FE is subject to control by Rigsrevisionen (Government audit committee), to ensure that the money granted to the institution is spent as Folketinget has decided.

== See also ==
- Operation Dunhammer
- Global surveillance disclosures (2013–present)
- Danish Security and Intelligence Service (PET), civilian counterpart
