= Danish Security and Intelligence Service =

National security and intelligence agency of Denmark

Danish Security and Intelligence Service Politiets Efterretningstjeneste (Danish)

Agency overview
- Formed: 1 January 1951; 75 years ago
- Preceding agency: Sikkerhedspolitiet (SIPO)
- Employees: 1,001-5,000
- Annual budget: 800 million Kr.

Jurisdictional structure
- Operations jurisdiction: Kingdom of Denmark

Operational structure
- Headquarters: Buddinge
- Elected officer responsible: Nicolai Wammen, Minister of Justice
- Agency executive: Rasmus Kieffer-Kristensen, Director General

Website
- Official website

The Danish Security and Intelligence Service (DSIS; Danish: Politiets Efterretningstjeneste, lit. 'Police Intelligence Service', PET) is the national security and intelligence agency of Denmark. The agency focuses solely on national security while foreign intelligence operations are handled by the Danish Defense Intelligence Service.

The stated overall purpose of PET is to "prevent, investigate and counter operations and activities that pose or may pose a threat to the preservation of Denmark as a free, democratic and safe country".

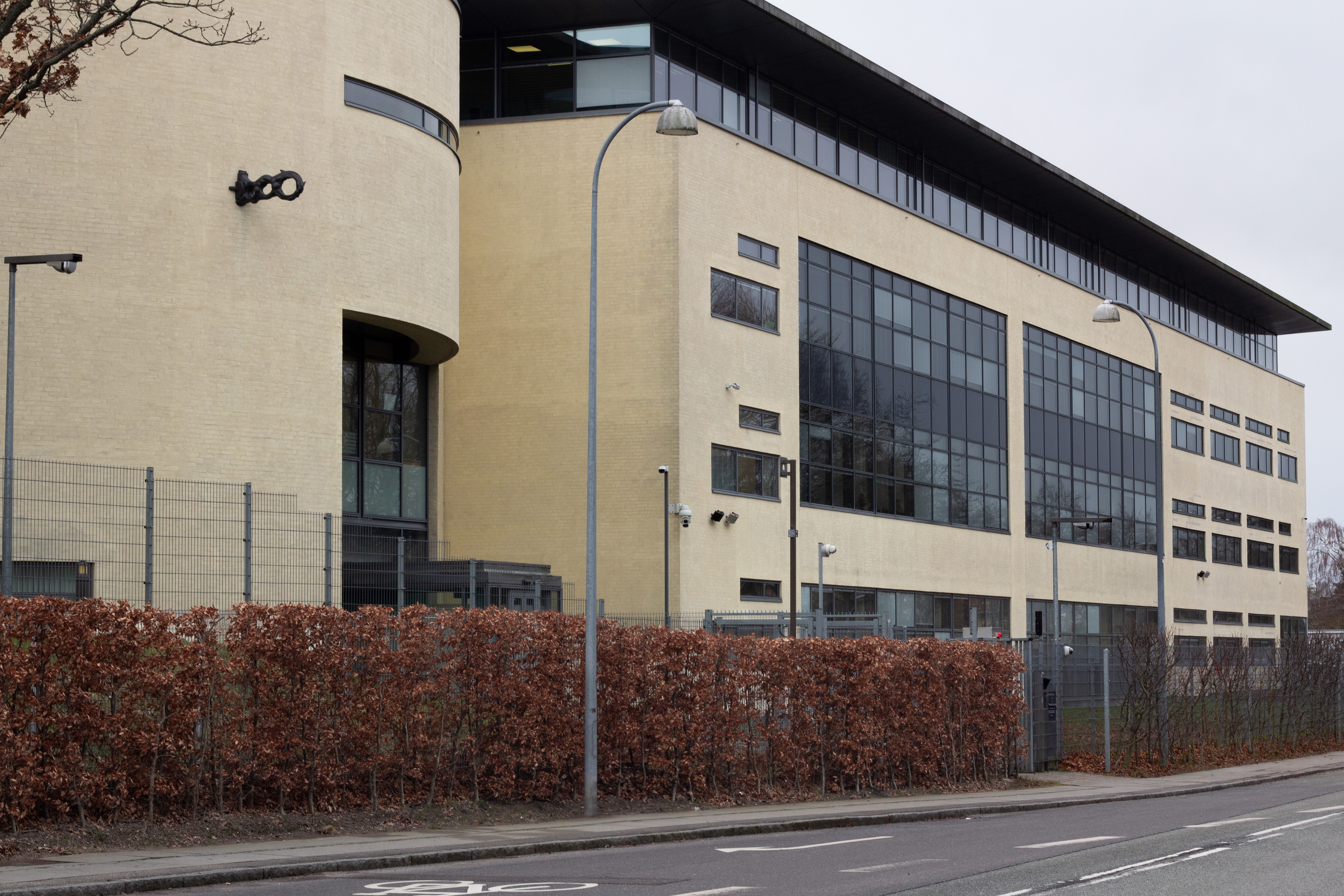
Headquarters of PET in Buddinge

== History ==
The history of PET can be traced back to shortly before World War II when the Danish police force expanded to create Sikkerhedspolitiet (SIPO; lit. 'Security Police').

=== From SIPO to REA ===
Shortly before the start of World War II, the Danish police force was expanded to also include a security police department, SIPO. SIPO was set up as an inspectorate under the Danish National Commissioner – on an equal footing with two other inspectorates covering the uniformed police and CID, respectively.

The expansion of the police force was done according to Act No. 90 of 15 March 1939 which was an amendment of the Public Servants Act. According to this act, SIPO was given the task of “providing a shield against undertakings or actions that can be presumed to be aimed at the independence of the Realm and the legal social system as well carrying out an effective supervision of aliens and travellers”.

Initially, it was decided that SIPO was solely to cover Denmark outside the capital of Copenhagen. In Copenhagen, the tasks of SIPO were to be handled by Department D of the Copenhagen Police, which was established in 1927. Among the responsibilities of this department were weapons control, radio licence and protection duties during state visits.

In the years following World War II and the liberation of Denmark on 4 May 1945, it was decided on 7 May 1945 to establish the National Commissioner’s Intelligence Department (Rigspolitichefens Efterretningsafdeling; abbr. REA), which was to carry out the tasks that had previously been handled by SIPO. In November 1947, SIPO was closed down for good.

=== PET is established ===
On 1 January 1951, the intelligence-related activities of the Danish police were separated off. An independent office was established under the National Commissioner and given the name the Danish Security and Intelligence Service, PET. Acting Commissioner of Police Ernst Brix was appointed Director-General of PET, and he reported to the Permanent Secretary of the Danish Ministry of Justice and, in special cases, to the Minister of Justice and the Prime Minister. At the same time, the police-related intelligence tasks were expanded.

PET was established with an HQ at the premises of the Copenhagen Police, from where its staff were to gather intelligence-related information from its contact persons in the police districts and from Department E (the former Department D) of the Copenhagen Police. Initially, the central department consisted of 27 criminal investigators and a number of administrative employees. The service was since moved to new offices at Police Station Bellahøj following a staff increase.

=== PET during the Cold War ===
In the beginning, PET aimed much of its focus at espionage and other intelligence-related activities carried out by the Soviet Union and the Eastern Bloc countries. On one hand, it was the assessment that the Cold War was fought through the use of intelligence-related methods instead of weapons. On the other hand, there was still a fear that the Cold War could turn into a so-called “hot” war, meaning an actual military confrontation. This fear was so tangible that one of the measures taken was to build so-called secure facilities that were to house the government during emergency and war situations.

To PET and other intelligence services, intelligence work during the Cold War was synonymous with acquiring an insight into political affairs and this was inherently a sensitive matter. Erik Eriksen (the Danish Liberal Party), Danish Prime Minister from 1950 to 1953, therefore used the expression that the service was to do “as little as possible as effectively as possible”.

=== The supervision of PET ===
In 1964, a parliamentary control committee was established with the task of supervising e.g. the registrations carried out by the service. The chairman of the committee, County Governor A.M. Wamberg, also lent his name to the committee, the so-called Wamberg Committee.

Four years later, on 30 September 1968, the government at the time furthermore stated: “Today, the Government has decided that the registration of Danish citizens can no longer be made solely on grounds of legal political activities.

In 1998, the registration of individuals was one of the issues that were reopened by the PET Commission, which dealt with the intelligence-related activities of the police within the political area from 1945 to 1989. The report of the Commission was published in 2009.

In 1998, the Danish Ministry of Justice also appointed the so-called Wendler Pedersen Committee, which was headed by Supreme Court Judge Hugo Wendler Pedersen. The committee was given the task of reviewing the regulations governing the registration of individuals and organizations by PET and the Danish Defence Intelligence Service (DDIS). Furthermore, the committee was to look into the underlying rules for PET and assess the need for more unified regulation of PET’s activities.

In 2012, the committee presented its recommendations which led to the Act on the Danish Security and Intelligence Service (the PET Act) which came into force on 1 January 2014. The act defines the tasks of PET and, among other things, it stipulates when it is allowed to obtain and process information concerning physical and legal entities, when the information may be passed on, and when it is to be deleted. A new oversight board, which was to replace the Wamberg Committee, was established in connection with the PET Act. The board, which has been named the Danish Intelligence Oversight Board, is an independent body with its own secretariat.

=== Terrorism and extremism ===
On 11 September 2001, al-Qaida carried out its terrorist attack against the World Trade Center which resulted in the collapse of the enormous towers right in front of the citizens of New York and TV viewers all over the world. Ever since the fight against terrorism has been an international main priority. Early on, it was clear that the threat picture had changed – in Denmark as well – and PET now uses considerable resources to identify, prevent, investigate and counter the terror threat to Danish society. Apart from terrorism, the threats to Danish society are primarily posed by political extremism and espionage, and they are aimed at targets not only in Denmark but also against Danes and Danish interests abroad.

The changed threat picture in recent years has had the effect a substantial amount of resources has been allocated to PET, turning it into an organization whose staff today consists of a complex group of people from a wide variety of professional areas who possess many different skills.

== Organization ==
Since 2003, PET headquarters has been located in the Copenhagen suburb of Buddinge with satellite offices located in local police stations in the municipalities of Århus and Odense, respectively. Because the service is integrated with the Danish police, they have representatives in all police precincts of Denmark.

As Denmark's national security and intelligence service, PET works to identify, prevent, investigate and counter threats to the freedom, democracy and security of Danish society. PET lies within the remit of the Danish Ministry of Justice, and the Director General of PET reports directly to the Minister of Justice.

PET’s top management consists of the Director General of PET, the Director of Operations, the Director of Legal Affairs and the Director of Administration. In addition, PET’s Management Board comprises the Heads of the Counterterrorism Department, the Intelligence Collection Department, the Counterintelligence Department, the Security Department and SIOC (Strategic Information and Operations Centre).

Centre for Terror Analysis (CTA) is a fusion center comprising staff from four Danish authorities (PET, the Danish Defense Intelligence Service, the Ministry of Foreign Affairs and the Emergency Management Agency). CTA provides analyses and assessments of the terrorist threat to Denmark and Danish interests abroad.

== Oversight ==
PET is subject to independent oversight by the Intelligence Oversight Board and parliamentary oversight by the Intelligence Services Committee of the Danish Parliament.

=== The Intelligence Oversight Board ===
The Intelligence Oversight Board independently oversees PET’s processing of data on natural and legal persons, ensuring that it complies with the PET Act and any regulations issued pursuant to this act.

The Intelligence Oversight Board can gain access to all PET's information and any material of importance to the work of the Board.

Moreover, natural and legal persons can request that the Intelligence Oversight Board examines whether PET is wrongfully processing information on them. Having ensured that this is not the case, the Board will notify the requesting party.

The Intelligence Oversight Board submits an annual oversight report on PET to the Minister of Justice, who presents the report to the Intelligence Services Committee of the Danish Parliament.

The website of the Intelligence Oversight Board provides information on the Board and contains the most recent annual oversight report.

=== The Intelligence Services Committee ===
The political oversight of PET is ensured by a special parliamentary committee, the Intelligence Services Committee. The Committee was set up in 1988 to provide insight into the activities of the intelligence services.

The tasks of the Committee are set out in the act on the setting up of a committee on the intelligence services of the Danish Defence and the Danish police.

The Government must keep the Committee informed of important security and foreign policy issues of significance to the activities of the intelligence services. Furthermore, the Committee must be informed of intelligence service guidelines prior to their issuance.

If PET does not comply with a request from the Intelligence Oversight Board, the Government must notify the Committee.

The Committee consists of five MPs appointed by the political parties that are members of the Presidium of the Danish Parliament. The Committee appoints its own chairman. The members are bound by professional secrecy with respect to the information they receive as committee members.

== General overview ==
It is the task of PET to prevent, investigate, and counter threats to the freedom, democracy and security of Danish society, including the Danish Realm. Against this backdrop, PET handles a wide range of intelligence and security tasks on a daily basis.

The intelligence task of PET consists of collecting, analyzing and communicating information concerning threats to Denmark and Danish interests, while the nature of the security task is to counter the threats identified by the intelligence efforts. The balancing point between intelligence and security tasks in PET is dynamic and determined by current threats and various other external factors.

== Operational tasks ==
=== Security ===
==== Security assessment ====
PET uses knowledge from its intelligence work to identify critical and vulnerable targets in relation to acts of terrorism. A dynamic threat picture requires immediate action for PET to keep on the threats through appropriate security measures.

To support the planning and execution of the security assignments, security and risk assessments as well as operational orders are prepared, which combined form the basis for assessing the overall security requirements. The security assessments are shared with the Danish police districts along with PET’s security recommendations in order that the districts are able to initiate the required protective measures and countermeasures in relation to specific events.

==== Personal protection ====
PET is responsible for all national personal protection assignments in Denmark. These assignments mainly concern members of the Royal Family, the government, the parliament, other official representatives of Denmark, foreign representations in Denmark and individuals under particular threat. In addition, security assignments are planned and carried out in connection with high-profile official visits to Denmark, for example state visits, political conferences and similar major events.

PET also handles security assignments in connection with politicians travelling to high-risk areas as well as local, regional and general elections and, for instance, when Danish athletes participate in major sporting events abroad.

The Personal Protection Unit is responsible for all national personal protection assignments in Denmark.

==== Guard and protection assignments ====
In addition to the personal protection assignments, PET is also responsible for stationary guard and personal protection assignments such as the physical security around designated locations in Denmark, the guarding of PET’s own premises and various ad hoc guarding assignments. The Security Section under PET’s Special Intervention Unit handles guard and protection assignments.

==== Counterterrorism response ====
One of PET’s key security assignments is to maintain an operational counterterrorism response in Denmark and contribute to fighting serious organized crime by providing sound solutions to complex police assignments where standard police training and equipment are inadequate. These assignments are handled by the Special Intervention Unit, which is an operational special unit at PET.

==== Negotiation Team ====
The negotiation assignments of the Danish police are coordinated by PET, who organizes and coordinates instruction, training and operations with all police negotiators in Denmark. The negotiators are organized in PET and the police districts, respectively, and handle national as well as international operations that include negotiation as part of the strategy. This could be in connection with incidents that require negotiation in order to avoid the use of force, to prevent any damage, to collect information or to facilitate surrender. The Negotiation Team responds to cases involving, among other things, kidnapping, barricaded dangerous offenders, armed mentally ill individuals and suicidal individuals.

PET’s Negotiation Team is part of the Special Intervention Unit.

=== Investigation of criminal cases ===
Often, the most effective way of countering a specific threat is to initiate criminal proceedings, especially in relation to terrorism and extremism.

The aim of PET's investigations is typically to establish sufficient grounds for proactive, early and targeted intervention in order to ensure that the threat never materializes. As part of this effort, sources, surveillance and other technical measures are commonly used.

PET has a special Centre for Investigation tasked with providing the best possible basis for bringing criminal charges in cases relating to terrorism, extremism and espionage. Like the rest of the Danish police, any criminal investigation performed by PET is subject to the provisions of the Administration of Justice Act.

Investigation and prosecution take place in close collaboration with the police and the Prosecution Service. When PET for instance investigates a terrorism or espionage case, the case is typically transferred to the relevant police district in connection with the initial arrests, by agreement with the Prosecution Service. The police district then finalizes the investigation and hands it over to the Prosecution Service, which brings it to court. Sometimes, PET assists the investigation until the trial begins, while, in other cases, they also assist in trying the case.

=== Prevention of radicalization and terrorism ===
Our preventive efforts aim to keep individuals from finding their way into environments where they would be at risk of becoming radicalized. And to keep former terror convicts from returning to radicalized ideologies and environments.

Militant extremists may be willing to use violent means to achieve their political, ideological or religious objectives and may inspire and radicalize others. Prevention of extremism is therefore a key priority for PET.

A part of PET’s preventive work is done in cooperation with the Danish Prison and Probation Service, municipalities, the Danish Centre for Prevention of Extremism, the Danish National Police and the police districts, just as PET cooperates with a number of organizations, clubs and associations.

As part of PET’s preventive efforts, PET educates members of staff at for instance the Danish Prison and Probation Service, the Danish Immigration Service, the Armed Forces, the psychiatric sector and the local police districts in order to raise their awareness of the threat picture and enable them to identify and handle signs of radicalization early on.

=== Intelligence work ===
As the national intelligence service, PET must be able to provide an updated and accurate intelligence picture in order to identify threats and provide early warning.

The intelligence work comprises collection, processing, analysis and communication of data and enables PET to solve its other tasks. Systematic intelligence work is mainly conducted in relation to counterintelligence and counterterrorism.

=== Security advisory services ===
PET offers advice to private and public actors on how to prevent terrorism, espionage, illegal foreign interference and illegal procurement.

=== Threat assessment and analysis ===
PET conducts threat assessments to identify and prevent security risks to Denmark, Danish interests, and the Danish Realm. These assessments serve as fundamental components of the agency's operations in counterterrorism and counterintelligence.

==== Assessments of the espionage and terrorist threats ====
In January 2022, PET published its Assessment of the Espionage Threat to Denmark. The assessment outlines the threat from foreign intelligence services targeting Denmark.

Centre for Terror Analysis (CTA) publishes an annual Assessment of the Terrorist Threat to Denmark, determining the general terrorist threat level in Denmark and assessing the threat to Danish interests abroad. CTA was set up on 1 January 2007 as a Danish fusion centre for analysis and assessment of the terrorist threat to Denmark and Danish interests abroad.

==== Specific threat assessments ====
PET provides regular threat assessments and analyses aimed at preparing society in the best possible way to meet new challenges related to terrorism and espionage, which may emerge with a changing threat picture.

PET’s analyses range from assessments of the threat against specific individuals, locations and events to more generic trend analyses and assessments of phenomena with an impact on the threat to Denmark and Danish interests abroad. The analyses cover a number of topics relating to terrorism – including militant Islamism, political extremism, radicalization, recruitment, networks, modus operandi, terrorist financing as well as other trends which may affect the threat. Counterintelligence analyses deal with more generic trends and themes of relevance to the threat from foreign intelligence activities targeting the Danish Realm, including espionage, illegal procurement, foreign direct investments (FDI), foreign interference as well as harassment of refugees and dissidents. The analyses and threat assessments contain information from all relevant and reliable sources, which, combined, forms the basis for the overall assessments.

The threat assessments and analyses are based on both classified and unclassified information and are primarily for use by PET’s operational departments and external public authorities such as ministries, government agencies and police districts. The analyses and threat assessments are usually classified and therefore not suitable for public disclosure.

== Publications ==
PET releases a number of publications, assessments, analyses and guides in both English and Danish. Some are published annually, while others are published ad hoc.

== Criticism and public relations ==
PET was criticized in the late 1990s for being closed to the public and has tried to counter these claims by adopting a more open approach. Thus, PET has taken to maintain a website explaining its overall aims and obligations and publishing an annual public report surveying extremist activities in Denmark and the threat level to national domestic security (albeit only in a very overall fashion).

Following a report into the 2015 Copenhagen shootings, Jens Madsen resigned.

== People with bodyguards ==
PET does not comment on whom they offer specific bodyguard protection. However, it is publicly established that the following people are under permanent protection:

- Frederik X of Denmark
- Mary of Denmark
- Margrethe II of Denmark
- Mette Frederiksen, prime minister of Denmark

These people have or have had at some time full-time protection:

- Rasmus Paludan, politician and leader of the Hard Line anti-immigration political party
- Pia Kjærsgaard, former speaker of the Danish parliament Folketinget, and former leader of the right-wing political party Dansk Folkeparti
- Helle Thorning-Schmidt, former Prime minister of Denmark and former leader of the Social Democrats
- Lars Løkke Rasmussen, former Prime minister of Denmark and former leader of Venstre
- Naser Khader, member of the Danish parliament
- Kurt Westergaard, cartoonist
- Prince Joachim of Denmark
- Lars Hedegaard, historian and journalist

== See also ==
- Danish Defense Intelligence Service, (Forsvarets Efterretningstjeneste, FE), its military counterpart
- Politiets Aktionsstyrke (AKS), the special response unit of the Danish police.
- The PET Commission.
- Intelligence (information gathering)
- Politics of Denmark
