= List of newspapers in Norway =

The number of national daily newspapers in Norway was 96 in 1950, whereas it was 83 in 1965. A total of 191 newspapers was published in 1969. There were 221 newspapers in the country in 1996. The number of the newspaper was 233 in the country in 1999. The Institute for Information and Media Science at the University of Bergen listed 296 newspapers in 2003. There were 297 titles in 2012.

== Categories ==
Norwegian newspapers fall into several categories:

- National newspapers, i.e., those that target readers in all regions.
- Political party newspapers, i.e., those that function more or less as a party or political movement's mouthpiece.
- Regional newspapers, i.e., those that target readers in a geographic area.
- Tabloid and broadsheet papers.

== Newspapers ==
Following is a sample of newspapers published in Norway.

Newspaper	Category	Frequency	Circulation (2022)	Script style	Owner (in 2014)	Notes
Adresseavisen	regional	daily	75,584	Blackletter (1767-1910) Antiqua (1910-)	Adresseavisen ASA	
Aftenposten	national	daily	252,448	Blackletter (1860-1912) Antiqua (1912-)	Aftenposten AS	
Agder	regional	twice a week	6,669		Avisen Agder AS	
Agderposten	regional	daily	19,633		AS Agderposten	
Akers Avis	regional		8,713			
Akershus Amtstidende	regional	daily	8,138		Akershus Amtstidende AS	
Ullern Avis/Akersposten	regional		1,051			
Altaposten	regional		5,091			
Alvdal midt i væla	regional		2,314			
Andøyposten	regional	twice a week	1,752		Andøyposten AS	
Arbeidets Rett	regional		7,322			
Arendals Tidende	regional		1,195			
Askøyværingen	regional	twice a week	4,917		Askøyværingen AS	
Aura Avis	regional		3,019			
Aust Agder Blad	regional		3,693			
Avisa Hemnes	regional		1,434			
Avisa Lofoten	regional		1,217			
Avisa Nordland	regional	daily	21,820		Avisa Nordland AS	
Avisa Oslo	regional		8,533			
Ávvir	regional		1,422			
Bergens Tidende	regional	daily	89,533		Bergens Tidende AS	
Bergensavisen	regional	daily	27,815		Bergensavisen AS	
Birkenes-Avisa	regional		1,108			
Bladet	regional		7,779			
Bladet Vesterålen	regional	daily	7,577		Bladet Vesterålen AS	
Brønnøysunds avis	regional	daily	4,180		Brønnøysunds Avis AS	
Budstikka	regional	daily	22,762		Asker og Bærums Budstikke ASA	
Bygdanytt	regional		4,593			
Bygdebladet	regional		2,298			
Bygdabladet Randaberg og Rennesøy	regional		3,481			
Bygdeposten	regional		6,744			
Bø Blad	regional		2,806			
Bømlo-Nytt	regional		3,810			
Dag og Tid	national		13,758			Nynorsk
Dagbladet	national	daily	110,092		AS Dagbladet	tabloid
Dagen	national	daily	15,611		Dagbladet Dagen AS	conservative Christian
Dagens Næringsliv	national	daily	94,094		Dagens Næringsliv AS	business
Dagens Perspektiv	regional		4,121			
Dagsavisen	national	daily	20,787	Blackletter (1884-1912) Antiqua (1912-)	Stiftelsen Dagsavisen	social democratic
Dalane Tidende	regional	twice a week	6,775		Dalane Tidende og Egersunds Avis AS	
Drammens Tidende	regional	daily	27,373		Drammens Tidende og Buskeruds Blad AS	
Drangedalsposten	regional		1,723			
Driva	regional	twice a week	3,790		Driva-Trykk AS	
Dølen	regional		4,469			
Eidsvoll Ullensaker Blad	regional		7,255			
Eikerbladet	regional		2,235			
Enebakk Avis	regional	weekly	2,525		Enebakk Avis AS	
Fanaposten	regional	twice a week	3,591		Fanaposten AS	
Finansavisen	national		30,870			
Finnmark Dagblad	regional	daily	7,727		Finnmark Dagblad AS	
Finnmarken	regional	daily	6,411		Dagbladet Finnmarken AS	
Finnmarksposten	regional		1,565			
Firda	regional	daily	11,298		Avishuset Firda AS	
Firda Tidend	regional	twice a week	2,996		Avisdrift Gloppen A/S	
Firdaposten	regional	twice a week	4,837		Firdaposten AS	
Fiskeribladet	national		7,286			fisheries
Fjell-Ljom	regional		2,602			
Fjordabladet	regional	twice a week	3,172		Fjordabladet AS	
Fjordenes Tidende	regional	twice a week	4,635		Fjordenes Tidende AS	
Fjordingen	regional	twice a week	3,902		Fjordingen AS	
Fjuken	regional	weekly	3,805		Skjåk Mediautvikling AS	
FlatangerNytt	regional		1,067			
Fosna-Folket	regional		7,829			
Framtid i nord	regional	twice a week	3,861		Mediaselskapet Nord-Norge Samkjøringen AS	
Fredriksstad Blad	regional	daily	23,058		Fredriksstad Blad AS	
Fremover	regional	daily	7,542		Fremover AS	
Friheten	national	weekly			Norges Kommunistiske Parti	communist
Frolendingen	regional		1,382			
Frostingen	regional		1,931			
Fædrelandsvennen	regional	daily	37,261		Fædrelandsvennen AS	
geita.no	regional		1,267			
Gjesdalbuen	regional	weekly	3,487			
Glåmdalen	regional	daily	14,307		Glåmdalen AS	
Grannar	regional		3,462			
Grenda	regional		2,814			
Grimstad Adressetidende	regional		6,193			
Gudbrandsdølen Dagningen	regional		22,685			
Hadeland	regional		7,115			
Halden Arbeiderblad	regional		8,252			social democratic
Hallingdølen	regional		10,755			
Hamar Arbeiderblad	regional		20,027			social democratic
Hammerfestingen	regional		1,156			
Hardanger Folkeblad	regional		5,303			
Harstad Tidende	regional		8,893			
Haugesunds Avis	regional		21,187			
Helgelands Blad	regional		4,137			
Helgelendingen	regional		6,658			
Hitra-Frøya	regional		4,981			
Hordaland	regional		8,380			
Hordaland Folkeblad	regional		4,951			
iHarstad	regional		3,179			
ILevanger	regional		2,338			
Inderøyningen	regional		2,010			
Indre Akershus Blad	regional		6,740			
Innherred	regional		8,576			
iTromsø	regional		8,590			
Jarlsberg Avis	regional		4,031			
Jærbladet	regional		12,971			
Kanalen	regional		2,203			
Karmøynytt	regional		1,611			
Klassekampen	national	daily	33,265		Klassekampen AS	socialist
Klæbuposten	regional		608			
Koordinatoren	online only		N/A			
Kragerø Blad Vestmar	regional		5,317			
Kronstadposten	regional		1,938			
Kulingen	regional		2,107			
Kvinnheringen	regional		4,105			
Kyst og Fjord	regional		2,396			
Laagendalsposten	regional		9,159			
Lierposten	regional		3,497			
Lillesands-Posten	regional		4,364			
Lindesnes	regional		6,110			
Lister	regional		6,042			
Lofotposten	regional		7,010			
Lofot-Tidende	regional		3,385			
Lokalavisa Nordsalten	regional		2,183			
Lokalavisa Trysil Engerdal	regional		2,227			
Lyngdals Avis	regional		1,632			
Marsteinen	regional		1,979			
Meråkerposten	regional		1,468			
Midsundingen	regional		1,010			
Mitt Kongsvinger	regional		1,824			
Morgenbladet	national		31,994	Blackletter (1819-1910) Antiqua (1910-)		conservative
Moss Avis	regional		14,236			
Møre	regional		3,045			
Møre-Nytt	regional	twice a week	5,060		Møre-Nytt AS	
Namdalsavisa	regional		11,181			
Nationen	national		17,275			agriculture
Nettavisen	online only		19,187			
Nidaros.no	online only		9,387			
Norddalen	regional		2,468			
Nordhordland	regional		5,062			
Nordlys	regional		25,736			
Haramsnytt	regional		1,981			
Nordre Aker Budstikke	regional		2,091			
Nordstrands Blad	regional		7,331			
Norge Idag	national		10,902			conservative Christian
Ny Tid	national					socialist
Nye Troms	regional	twice a week	3,480		Nye Troms AS	
Nyss	regional		3,955			
Oppland Arbeiderblad	regional	daily	20,442		Oppland arbeiderblad AS	social democratic
Os og Fusaposten	regional		5,969			
Panorama.no	online only					music
Porsgrunns Dagblad	regional	daily	5,441			
Porten	regional		1,664			
Rakkestad Avis	regional		2,410			
Rana Blad	regional	daily	8,914		AS Rana Blad	
Randaberg24	regional		885			
Raumnes	regional		5,823			
Ringerikes Blad	regional		11,318			
Ringsaker Blad	regional		8,358			
Rjukan Arbeiderblad	regional		2,468			
Romerikes Blad	regional	daily	33,148			
Romsdals Budstikke	regional	daily	17,127			
Ruijan Kaiku						Kven
Ryfylke	regional		2,216			
Røyken og Hurums Avis	regional		5,713			
Ságat	regional		3,138			
Sagene Avis	regional		784			
Saltenposten	regional	twice a week	3,806			
Samningen	regional		1,396			
Samoyiki	online only					online, Bengali
Sande Avis	regional		2,498			
Sandefjords Blad	regional	daily	12,896			
Sandnesposten	regional		9,574			
Sarpsborg Arbeiderblad	regional	daily	12,759		Sarpsborg Arbeiderblad AS	social democratic
Selbyggen	regional		2,762			
Setesdølen	regional		3,751			
Smaalenenes Avis	regional		12,050			
Snåsningen	regional		1,418			
Sogn Avis	regional	daily	9,613		Sogningen/Sogns Avis AS	
Solabladet	regional		4,175			
SolungAvisa	regional		1,959			
Stangeavisa	regional		2,837			
Stavanger Aftenblad	regional	daily	63,973		Stavanger Aftenblad ASA	
Steinkjer24	regional		1,926			
Steinkjer-Avisa	regional		4,730			
Stjørdals-Nytt	regional		1,614			
Stord24	regional		1,148			
Storfjordnytt	regional		1,287			
Strandbuen	regional	twice a week	5,185		Strandbuen AS	
Strilen	regional		5,519			
Sulaposten	regional		1,858			
Suldalsposten	regional		2,608			
Sunnhordland	regional	daily	7,032		Bladet Sunnhordland AS	
Sunnmørsposten	regional	daily	27,025		Sunnmørsposten AS	
Svalbardposten	regional	weekly	1,919		Stiftelsen Svalbardposten	
Svelviksposten	regional		1,912			
Sydvesten	regional		978			
Synste Møre	regional		1,998			
Sør-Trøndelag	regional		7,555			
Sør-Varanger Avis	regional		2,440			
Søvesten	regional		687			
Telemarksavisa	regional	daily	23,700		Telemarksavisa AS	
Telen	regional		4,300			
Tidens Krav	regional	daily	12,385		Tidens Krav AS	
Totens Blad	regional		1,681			
TradeWinds	international		N/A			maritime business
Troms Folkeblad	regional	daily			Troms Folkeblad AS	
Trønder-Avisa	regional	daily	19,912			
Trønderbladet	regional		5,479			
Tvedestrandsposten	regional		5,415			
Tysnes	regional		2,087			
Tysvær Bygdeblad	regional	weekly	2,155			
Tønsbergs Blad	regional	daily	22,957		Edda Vestfold AS	
Upstream	international					
Vaksdalposten	regional		2,233			
Valdres	regional		9,449			
Varden	regional	daily	17,199		Varden AS	
Varingen	regional		5,586			
Vennesla Tidende	regional		4,072			
Vestavind	regional		1,589			
Vestby Avis	regional		3,355			
Vesterålen Online	regional		5,913			
Vesteraalens Avis	regional	twice a week	1,420		Vesterålens Avis AS	
Vestlandsnytt	regional		4,628			
Vestnesavisa	regional		1,399			
VestNytt	regional	twice a week	7,312		Vestnytt AS	
Vest-Telemark Blad	regional	twice a week	5,731		Vest-Telemark Blad AS	
VG	national	daily	308,469		Verdens Gang AS	tabloid
Vigga	regional		2,292			
Vikebladet Vestposten	regional		4,576			
Våganavisa	regional		1,462			
Vårt Land	national	daily	21,823		Avisen Vårt Land AS	Christian
VårtOslo	regional		2,289			
Ytre Sogn Avis	regional		2,397			
Ytringen Avis	regional		2,397			
Østhavet	regional		1,212			
Østlandets Blad	regional		10,084			
Østlands-Posten	regional		12,215			
Østlendingen	regional		15,477			
Øy-Blikk	regional		1,131			
Øyene	regional		3,504			
Øyposten	regional		1,383			
Åndalsnes Avis	regional		3,438			
Ås Avis	regional		2,282			
Åsane Tidende	regional		1,367			

== Online editions ==
The Institute for Journalism provides a directory of online newspapers.

- All Daily Newspapers .
- All Daily Newspapers, Online Newsportal, Magazine and Others .
