= National Association of Local Newspapers =

Norwegian association for local newspapers

The National Association of Local Newspapers (Norwegian: Landslaget for lokalaviser, LLA) is a Norwegian association for local newspapers. The organization was established in Voss Municipality in 1976, and it works for its member companies' general conditions and interests.

Among the first issues it dealt with was inclusion of the smallest local newspapers in the direct press support system, which occurred in 1989. The association is now a co-owner of the Norwegian Audit Bureau of Circulations, the company responsible for monitoring newspapers' circulation figures. These figures are the basis for receiving press subsidies. The association also represents its member companies in various government agencies and committees.

The National Association of Local Newspapers is not a tariff organization, and therefore does not negotiate on behalf of its member companies. Some of the association's members are also members of the Norwegian Media Businesses' Association (MBL).

The National Association of Local Newspapers has over 100 small newspapers as members, representing a combined circulation of 330,000, or 950,000 readers. Most of the member newspapers are published one to three times a week, and they usually appear in print runs of 1,000 to 6,000 copies.

The secretariat of the association is in Oslo, and Rune Hetland is its general secretary. The association's board is headed by Ståle Melhus, who is also the editor of the local newspaper Fanaposten. The Local Newspaper of the Year prize is awarded at the association's annual meeting.

== Members (as of January 2012) ==
- Akers Avis Groruddalen
- Åmliavisa
- Andøyposten
- Arendals Tidende
- Askøyværingen
- Ås Avis
- Birkenesavisa
- Bø blad
- Bømlo-nytt
- Bremanger Budstikke
- Bygdanytt
- Bygdebladet
- Bygdebladet Randaberg og Rennesøy
- Dag og Tid
- Dalane Tidende
- Dølen
- Drangedalsposten
- Eidsvoll Ullensaker Blad
- Eikerbladet
- Enebakk Avis
- Fanaposten
- Finnmarksposten
- Fjell-Ljom
- Fjordabladet
- Fjordingen
- Fjuken
- Framtia
- Framtid i Nord
- Frolendingen
- Frostingen
- Gamlebyavisen
- Gaula
- Gauldalsposten
- Gjesdalbuen
- Grannar
- Grenda
- Hallingdølen
- Hammerfestingen
- Hardanger Folkeblad
- Hordaland
- Hordaland Folkeblad
- Inderøyningen
- Jarlsberg Avis
- Kanalen
- KlæbuPosten
- Klar Tale
- Kvinnheringen
- Kyst og Fjord
- Lierposten
- Lofot-Tidende
- Lokalavisa NordSalten
- Lokalavisa Verran-Namdalseid
- Marsteinen
- Meløyavisa
- Meråkerposten
- Møre
- Nordre
- Nordvestnytt
- Nye Troms
- Øksnesavisa
- OPP
- Os og Fusaposten
- Østerdølen
- Østhavet
- Øyavis
- Øy-Blikk
- Øyene
- Øyposten
- Raumnes
- Røyken og Hurums Avis
- Ryfylke
- Ságat
- Saltenposten
- Samningen
- Sande Avis
- Sandnesposten
- Selbyggen
- Snåsningen
- Søgne og Songdalen Budstikke
- Solabladet
- SolungAvisa
- SortlandsAvisa
- Søvesten
- Stangeavisa
- Steinkjer-Avisa
- Storfjordnytt
- Strandbuen
- Strilen
- Sulaposten
- Suldalsposten
- Sunnhordland
- Sunnmøringen
- Svalbardposten
- Svelviksposten
- Sydvesten
- Sykkylvsbladet
- Synste Møre
- Tysnes
- Tysvær Bygdeblad
- Våganavisa
- VaksdalPosten
- Varangeren
- Varingen
- Vennesla Tidende
- Vest-Telemark Blad
- Vestavind
- Vesteraalens Avis
- Vestby Avis
- Vestlandsnytt
- Vestnesavisa
- Vestnytt
- Vigga
