= Varangeren =

Norwegian newspaper

Varangeren was a local Norwegian newspaper published once a week in Vadsø in Finnmark county.

The newspaper was launched on August 8, 2007. It covered news from Vadsø Municipality and was in strong competition with the newspaper Finnmarken. The paper was established and managed by Torbjørn Nordgård; Nordgård also managed the newspapers Østhavet based in Vardø and Sør-Varanger Avis based in Kirkenes. Varangeren was printed by Sør-Varanger Avis, which was also involved in the paper's ownership, together with Østhavet and local businesses in Vadsø. The paper was edited by Torbjørn Ittelin from 2007 to 2008, and by Gry Johanin from 2008 to 2012. Varangeren ceased publication in June 2012 after financially struggling for a long time because of low advertising revenues.

== Circulation ==
According to the Norwegian Audit Bureau of Circulations and National Association of Local Newspapers, Varangeren had the following annual circulation:

- 2007: 1,071
- 2008: 1,176
- 2009: 1,236
- 2010: 1,219
- 2011: 1,188
