= Vestby Avis =

Norwegian newspaper

Logo of Vestby Avis

Vestby Avis (The Vestby Gazette) is a local Norwegian newspaper published in the municipality of Vestby in Akershus county.

The paper is published weekly by Amedia. It was launched on May 26, 2006, and at the same time the company also started publishing Ås Avis in the neighboring municipality of Ås. Initially it was published only once a month and was distributed free to all households in the municipality. The manager of both of these newspapers, as well as Enebakk Avis, is Anne E. Lunde. Vestby Avis is edited by Mattias Mellquist. The paper's editorial material is produced locally, but it shares its advertising with Akershus Amtstidende and Smaalenenes Avis.

== Circulation ==
According to the Norwegian Audit Bureau of Circulations and National Association of Local Newspapers, Vestby Avis has had the following annual circulation:

- 2007: 1,344
- 2008: 1,414
- 2009: 1,502
- 2010: 1,607
- 2011: 1,611
- 2012: 1,755
- 2013: 1,907
- 2014: 1,978
- 2015: 1,920
- 2016: 2,021

Growth in net circulation since 2007.
Paper subscriptions darker, digital share lighter.
