= Arnljot Eggen =

Norwegian writer

- Born: 13 August 1923; Tolga Municipality, Norway
- Died: 4 February 2009 (aged 85); Oslo, Norway
- Occupations: journalist, teacher, poet, playwright and children's writer
- Notable work: Baksideviser; Den lange streiken
- Awards: Melsom Prize – 1971; Norwegian Critics Prize for Literature – 1981; Dobloug Prize – 1985

Arnljot Eggen (13 August 1923 – 4 February 2009) was a Norwegian journalist, teacher and poet who also wrote plays and children's books.

== Personal life ==
Eggen was born at Tolga Municipality in Hedmark, Norway. He was the son of Eystein Eggen (1886–1973) and Emma Kvernmo (1890–1979). He was raised in Ålen Municipality where his father was a tradesman. He took the examen artium in 1944. Further schooling was interrupted during the Occupation of Norway by Nazi Germany. In 1949, he married nurse Esther Louise Eriksen. He died in Oslo in 2009.

== Career ==
Eggen had plans to become a journalist and held a temporary position with Østerdølen and Fjell-Ljom. From 1950 he worked as a teacher in primary school, including at Vinstra in Nord-Fron Municipality, in Vardal Municipality, and later in Bærum Municipality. From 1960 until 1965, he was employed at the Norwegian Museum of Cultural History in Bygdøy.

He made his literary debut in 1951, with the poetry collection Eld og is. He wrote in both standards of written Norwegian, Bokmål and Nynorsk. He was awarded the Norwegian Critics Prize for Literature for the children's book Den lange streiken. He received the Melsom Prize in 1971 for the songbook Bakside-viser, and again in 1995 for the poetry collection Det flyktige varige. In 1985 he received the Dobloug Prize for his authorship.

In the 1970s he became affiliated with the Workers' Communist Party (now the Red party). He was considered one of the leading left-wing poets in Norway at the time, and was a pioneer of political theatre, the best known play being 1973's Pendlerne. He also had a column in the daily left-wing newspaper Klassekampen.

== Awards ==
- Melsom Prize – 1971
- Norwegian Critics Prize for Literature – 1981
- Dobloug Prize (Shared with Bergljot Hobæk Haff) – 1985
