= Frolendingen =

Newspaper published in Froland, Agder, Norway

Frolendingen (lit. 'The Frolander') is a local Norwegian newspaper, published on Wednesdays in Froland Municipality in Agder county.

Frolendingen was established in 2005. It is an independent paper for the residents of the municipality of Froland. The newspaper is owned by about 100 companies and private individuals, each of whom hold between one and 100 shares. The newspaper is a member of the National Association of Local Newspapers and it follows the Ethical Code of Practice for the Norwegian Press. The paper is published every Wednesday, and it covers local events and news.

== Editors ==
Since it was launched, Frolendingen has had five editors. Cornelius Munkvik edited the paper from its beginning until 2007, and was succeeded by Ottar Johansen. Johansen retired on December 31, 2010, and was succeeded by Olav Svaland on January 1, 2011. Svaland was silenced by the board of Frolendingen in August 2011, after the board suspended the newspaper due to an article the editor had written about an employee in the municipality of Froland. The person concerned was the county leader of the group Folk for frihet (People for Freedom). Svaland, who left the newspaper in the fall of 2011, has stated that he believes that being silenced was a clear violation of freedom of speech.

The next editor, serving from August 2011 to April 2015, was Elin Drivdal. She was succeeded in May 2015 by Baard Larsen. Larsen had previously worked as an editor at Åmliavisa, and prior to that had worked for over 10 years at Grimstad Adressetidende and one year at Fædrelandsvennen.

== Circulation ==
According to the Norwegian Audit Bureau of Circulations and National Association of Local Newspapers, Frolendingen has had the following annual circulation:

- 2006: 1,599
- 2007: 1,565
- 2008: 1,538
- 2009: 1,601
- 2010: 1,609
- 2011: 1,561
- 2012: 1,577
- 2013: 1,417
- 2014: 1,405
- 2015: 1,308
- 2016: 1,335
