= Hanne Sigbjørnsen =

Norwegian cartoonist (born 1989)

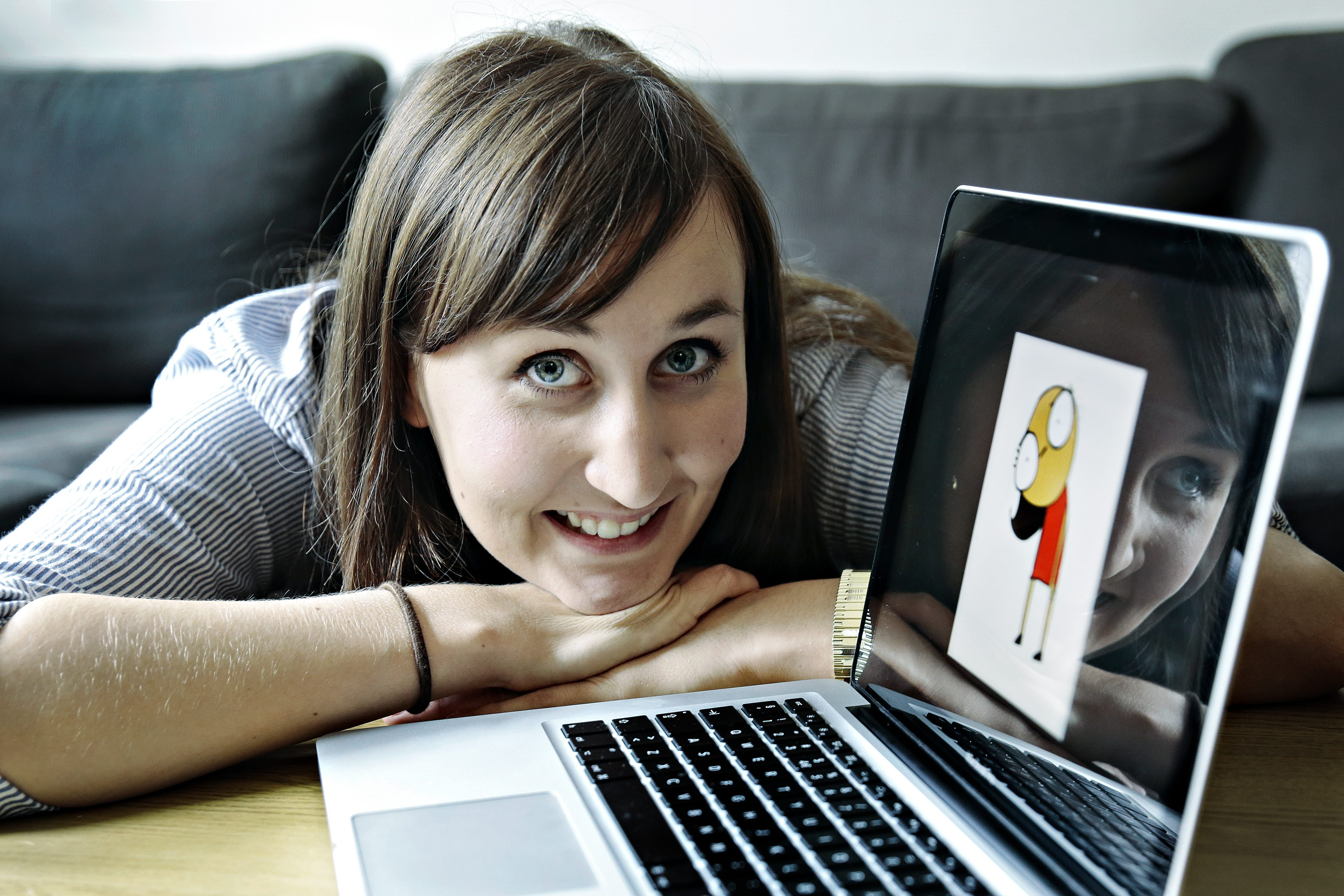
- Born: 8 December 1989 (age 36) Bryne, Norway
- Areas: cartoonist, illustrator, blogger
- Pseudonym: Tegnehanne

Hanne Monge Sigbjørnsen (born 8 December 1989) is a Norwegian cartoonist, blogger and nurse under the pseudonym "Tegnehanne". Her Tegnehanne blog has received acclaim by media outlets and awards.

== Works ==
Sigbjørnsen started her blog in 2010. She created her blog following her move from Bryne to Oslo. Her blog features comic strips about the character Tegnehanne in events mainly inspired by real-life. One example originated from a moment in 2009 when Sigbjørnsen was working in a part-time job at a Peppes Pizza in Bryne and was scolded by a customer unhappy with her coffee. She chose to study nursing instead of animation, her other considered option. Her character was also given a nursing career following Sigbjørnsen's completed nursing study. Her blog's genre was described by the website Sykepleien as a cross between a comic and a blog. The majority of readers are females ages 20–30. She also created the comic H&M that was published online and on the publications Sandnesposten, Dagbladet, and Inside.

The Tegnehanne comic strips were first printed for the Spirit magazine and have been included in Aftenposten online since 2013. In 2015, a book consisting of old and new strips was published by Egmont.

She illustrated the Verdens kuleste gjeng (The World's Coolest Kids) books by Maja Lunde.

== Awards and honours ==
Sigbjørnsen's blog was named as blog of the year in the Vixen Blog Awards 2011. In 2012, she was honoured by Nettavisen's Side2 publication to have "Norway's most beloved blog." Siri Narverud Moen, a comic reviewer for NRK, noted the blog's coverage of "life's trivialities" and that they "constantly touch on important issues of life and death" while reviewing the original book. Moen also praised the humour of the blog and its reflection to the truth. Sigbjørnsen was given the Pondus award in 2015, the first woman to do so.
