= Gauldalsposten =

Norwegian newspaper

Gauldalsposten (lit. 'The Gauldal Gazette') is a local Norwegian newspaper, published in Midtre Gauldal Municipality in Trøndelag county.

The newspaper was first published in January 2008, and it comes out on Wednesdays. It is edited by Bjørn Ivar Haugen.

== Circulation ==
According to the Norwegian Audit Bureau of Circulations and National Association of Local Newspapers, Gauldalsposten has had the following annual circulation:

- 2008: 1,454
- 2009: 1,534
- 2010: 1,558
- 2011: 1,574
- 2012: 1,654
- 2013: 1,595
- 2014: 1,730
- 2015: 1,617
- 2016: 1,631
