= Voss Tidende =

Norwegian newspaper

Voss Tidende was a Norwegian newspaper, published in Voss Municipality in Hordaland county.

Voss Avis was started in 1906. It changed its name to Voss Tidende in 1912, but went defunct in 1913. It was meant to be an oppositional organ to the Hordaland newspaper, but it failed.
