= Birkenes =

Birkenes may refer to:

== Places ==
- Birkenes Municipality, a municipality in Agder county, Norway
- Birkenes Church, a church in Birkenes Municipality in Agder county, Norway

== Other ==
- Birkenes IL, a sports club based in Birkenes Municipality in Agder county, Norway
- Birkenes Gazette, or Birkenesavisa, a newspaper based in Birkenes Municipality in Agder county, Norway
