= Søgne og Songdalen Budstikke =

Norwegian newspaper

Søgne og Songdalen Budstikke (lit. 'The Søgne and Songdalen Bidding Stick') was a politically independent local Norwegian newspaper covering Søgne Municipality and Songdalen Municipality in Vest-Agder county. The newspaper was published between 1999 and 2020.

After its launch in 1999, Søgne og Songdalen Budstikke was partly owned by newspaper Fædrelandsvennen, but later became part of Schibsted. The printed edition was published every Wednesday morning.

Originally located in Søgne, the paper moved to Mandal during its latter days.

== Circulation ==
According to the Norwegian Audit Bureau of Circulations and National Association of Local Newspapers, Søgne og Songdalen Budstikke has had the following annual circulation:

- 2006: 2,608
- 2007: 2,719
- 2008: 2,793
- 2009: 2,890
- 2010: 3,021
- 2011: 3,008
- 2012: 3,072
- 2013: 3,306
- 2014: 3,012
- 2015: 3,069
- 2016: 2,920
