= Nordvestnytt =

Norwegian newspaper

Nordvestnytt (lit. 'Northwest News') is a local Norwegian newspaper published once a week in Smøla Municipality in Møre og Romsdal county.

Nordvestnytt was founded in 1988. The paper covers news and events in Smøla Municipality and Aure Municipality. The paper is edited by Ivar Torset.

== Circulation ==
According to the Norwegian Audit Bureau of Circulations and National Association of Local Newspapers, Nordvestnytt has had the following annual circulation:

- 2004: 2,063
- 2005: 2,000
- 2006: 1,970
- 2007: 1,911
- 2008: 1,806
- 2009: 1,707
- 2010: 1,576
- 2011: 1,605
- 2012: 1,573
- 2013: 1,581
- 2014: 1,768
- 2015: 1,524
- 2016: 1,556
