= Sortland =

Sortland may refer to:

== Places ==
- Sortland Municipality, a municipality in Nordland county, Norway
- Sortland (town), a town within Sortland Municipality in Nordland county, Norway
- Sortland Church, a church in the town of Sortland in Sortland Municipality in Nordland county, Norway
- Sortland Bridge, a bridge in Sortland Municipality in Nordland county, Norway
- Sortland, Vestvågøy, a small village in Vestvågøy Municipality in Nordland county, Norway

== People ==
- Bjørn Sortland (born 1968), a Norwegian writer for children and young adults
- Jon Sortland (born 1973), an American musician, record producer, and video director
- Kjersti Sortland (born 1968), a Norwegian journalist, newspaper editor, and media executive

== Sport ==
- Sortland IL, a sports club based in Sortland Municipality in Nordland county, Norway
- Sortland Stadion, a sports stadium in Sortland Municipality in Nordland county, Norway

== See also ==
- SortlandsAvisa
