= Sykkylvsbladet =

Norwegian newspaper

Sykkylvsbladet (lit. 'The Sykkylven Gazette') is a local Norwegian newspaper published in Sykkylven Municipality in Møre og Romsdal county.

The paper mostly covers news from Sykkylven Municipality. It is printed twice a week, on Wednesdays and Fridays, and is published in Nynorsk. The paper is edited by Frank Kjøde and it is printed by Edda Trykk Nordvest AS.

== Circulation ==
According to the Norwegian Audit Bureau of Circulations and National Association of Local Newspapers, Sykkylvsbladet has had the following annual circulation:

- 2004: 2,756
- 2005: 2,792
- 2006: 2,833
- 2007: 2,937
- 2008: 2,980
- 2009: 3,017
- 2010: 3,026
- 2011: 2,971
- 2012: 2,975
- 2013: 2,927
- 2014: 2,856
- 2015: 2,797
- 2016: 2,718
