= Kanalen =

Newspaper published in Ulefoss, Norway

Kanalen (lit. 'The Canal') is a local Norwegian newspaper published in Ulefoss in Telemark county.

== History ==
Kanalen was established by Jan Arve Andersen in 2001, and it has covered events in Nome Municipality since 2012; prior to this it also covered news in Sauherad Municipality. It is currently edited by Tor Espen Simonsen. From 2003 to 2012 the newspaper was completely owned by the newspaper Varden. The paper's employees currently hold the majority of shares in the company.

The name Kanalen is derived from the Telemark Canal. The waterway and its locks run across the municipality of Nome and help link together the two largest urban areas, Ulefoss and Lunde. The newspaper serves the same purpose as a channel for media.

Kanalen is neutral in the choice between Bokmål and Nynorsk, but in practice it has been a Bokmål publication since it was launched. The municipality of Nome is composed of towns with very different social, cultural, and historical origins. The newspaper therefore emphasizes news and topical matters, prioritizing political, business, and social journalism.

Kanalen follows the Ethical Code of Practice for the Norwegian Press and distinguishes itself from the local newspaper tradition with a critical and socially oriented approach. The paper is a member of the National Association of Local Newspapers.

== Editors ==
- Jan Arve Andersen (2001–2006)
- Jarle Aaheim (2006–2009)
- Britt Eriksen (2009–2012)
- Tor Espen Simonsen (February 2012–)

== Circulation ==
According to the Norwegian Audit Bureau of Circulations and the National Association of Local Newspapers, Kanalen has had the following annual circulation:

- 2004: 1,869
- 2005: 2,130
- 2006: 2,069
- 2007: 2,020
- 2008: 2,049
- 2009: 1,909
- 2010: 1,800
- 2011: 1,744
- 2012: 1,774
- 2013: 1,845
- 2014: 1,893
- 2015: 1,959
- 2016: 1,842
