= Øyavis =

Local Norwegian newspaper

Øyavis (the Island Gazette) was a local Norwegian newspaper published in Midsund Municipality in Møre og Romsdal county.

== History ==
The first issue of the paper appeared in March 1983, after which the paper was published once a month with local material from Midsund, covering the local population as well as people that had moved away from the municipality, until it ceased publication in March 2016. The paper's circulation fully covered the municipality of Midsund (about 650 households/subscriptions) plus about 1,100 subscribers outside the municipality and around 35 subscribers abroad. The newspaper was published in Nynorsk and its editorial office was in the upper floor of the municipal building in Midsund.

The idea for the newspaper was conceived in the teachers' staff room at Midsund Primary School. Five teachers laid the foundation for the paper later called Øyavis: Ola Agnar Grønskag, Ole Arild Bøe, Kåre Bjørn Huse, Arve Misund, and Odd Fremstedal. Fremstedal ended up serving as the paper's editor, and the paper stopped appearing after his sudden death in March 2016. The first copies of the newspaper were typeset using a linotype machine, and the first issue was called Lokalavis 'local newspaper'. Its readers were encouraged to suggest a name for the newspaper, and thus it came to be called Øyavis. The newspaper received a cultural award in 1993. In December 1999, parts of the newspaper started appearing online for the first time.

== Circulation ==
According to the Norwegian Audit Bureau of Circulations and National Association of Local Newspapers, Øyavis had the following annual circulation:

- 2004: 1,968
- 2005: 1,961
- 2006: 1,939
- 2007: 1,943
- 2008: 1,958
- 2009: 1,975
- 2010: 1,941
- 2011: 1,875
- 2012: 1,941
