= Ås Avis =

Norwegian newspaper

Ås Avis (The Ås Gazette) is a weekly newspaper in the municipality of Ås, Norway published by Mediehuset Indre Østfold/Follo, part of Amedia. The first issue was published on May 26, 2006, and the company also began issuing Vestby Avis at the same time in the neighboring municipality of Vestby. Henrik Christie is the editor and general manager of the newspaper.

The paper's editorial material is produced locally, but the newspaper has shared advertising with Akershus Amtstidende and Smaalenenes Avis.

== Circulation ==
According to the Norwegian Audit Bureau of Circulations and the National Association of Local Newspapers, Ås Avis has had the following annual circulation:

- 2007: 1,221
- 2008: 1,388
- 2009: 1,495
- 2010: 1,653
- 2011: 1,686
- 2012: 1,684
- 2013: 1,853
- 2014: 1,886
- 2015: 1,793
- 2016: 1,826
