= Sunnmøringen =

Newspaper in Norway

Sunnmøringen (lit. 'The Sunnmøre Resident') is a local Norwegian newspaper published twice a week in Stranda Municipality in Møre og Romsdal county.

The paper covers news from Stranda Municipality. It was edited from 1994 to 2007 by Helge Søvik, and then by Gyri Aure from 2007 to 2008, when Herborg Bergaplass took over the editorship. In 2017, Bjørn Arild Hatlem was succeeded by Johan Behrentz as editor. The newspaper is owned by Polaris Media.

== Circulation ==
According to the Norwegian Audit Bureau of Circulations and National Association of Local Newspapers, Sunnmøringen has had the following annual circulation:

- 2004: 2,092
- 2005: 2,064
- 2006: 1,990
- 2007: 1,986
- 2008: 1,981
- 2009: 1,992
- 2010: 1,974
- 2011: 2,013
- 2012: 1,976
- 2013: 1,887
- 2014: 1,822
- 2015: 1,742
- 2016: 1,605
