= Dølen (Vinstra) =

Norwegian newspaper

Dølen (lit. 'The Dalesman') is a local Norwegian newspaper published in Vinstra in Innlandet county. It is not affiliated with any political party. The newspaper covers events in the central Gudbrandsdalen valley in Ringebu Municipality, Sør-Fron Municipality, and Nord-Fron Municipality. The editorship is based in Vinstra, and the newspaper contains material in both Bokmål and Nynorsk. The newspaper was first published on 31 July 1997, and it is issued once a week on Tuesdays.

The motto of the newspaper is "For døl og dal" (lit. 'For dalesman and valley'). The paper is a member of the National Association of Local Newspapers and Norwegian Media Businesses' Association, and it had a circulation of 3,839 as of 31 December 2014.

The editor of the newspaper is Bjørn Kjellsson Sletten. Sletten was replaced by a successor in September 2017.

== Circulation ==
According to the Norwegian Audit Bureau of Circulations and National Association of Local Newspapers, Dølen has had the following annual circulation:

- 2004: 3,501
- 2005: 3,561
- 2006: 3,943
- 2007: 4,242
- 2008: 4,325
- 2009: 4,239
- 2010: 4,292
- 2011: 4,190
- 2012: 4,056
- 2013: 3,973
- 2014: 3,839
- 2015: 3,851
- 2016: 3,732
