= Grenda (newspaper) =

Norwegian newspaper

Grenda (Nynorsk for 'The Hamlet') is a local Norwegian newspaper, covering events in Kvinnherad Municipality in Vestland county.

Grenda is published in Nynorsk. The editorial board is based in Rosendal, and in 2005 it consisted of seven people. Its offices are located at Skålagato 36 in Rosendal. The newspaper Sunnhordland prints Grenda in Stord.

Grenda was established in 1951 by Olav Aurvold, who was later succeeded by Knut Hass as owner and editor. In turn, Hass sold the newspaper in 2000. The current editor is Håvard Sætrevik.

== Circulation ==
According to the Norwegian Audit Bureau of Circulations and National Association of Local Newspapers, Grenda has had the following annual circulation:

- 2004: 2,912
- 2005: 2,758
- 2006: 2,733
- 2007: 2,622
- 2008: 2,550
- 2009: 2,415
- 2010: 2,376
- 2011: 2,364
- 2012: 2,334
- 2013: 2,308
- 2014: 2,318
- 2015: 2,325
- 2016: 2,387
- 2017: 2,255
- 2018: 2,196
- 2019: 2,246
- 2020: 2,343
- 2021: 2,624
