= Gaula =

Gaula or GAULA may refer to:

== Places ==
- Gaula (Madeira), a civil parish in the municipality of Santa Cruz in the island of Madeira in Portugal
- Gaula (Trøndelag), a river in Trøndelag county in Norway
- Gaula river valley or Gauldalen, a valley in Trøndelag county in Norway
- Gaula (Vestland), a river in Vestland county in Norway
- Gaula River (India), a river in India originating in the Lesser Himalayas

== Other ==
- Gaula (newspaper), a local Norwegian newspaper
- Gaula (raga), a musical scale (raga) in Carnatic music (South Indian classical music)
- Amadigi di Gaula, a "magic" opera in three acts, with music by George Frideric Handel
- Grupos de Acción Unificada por la Libertad Personal (Unified Action Groups for Personal Liberty), groups in the National Army of Colombia combating hostage-taking
