= Arendals Tidende =

Norwegian newspaper

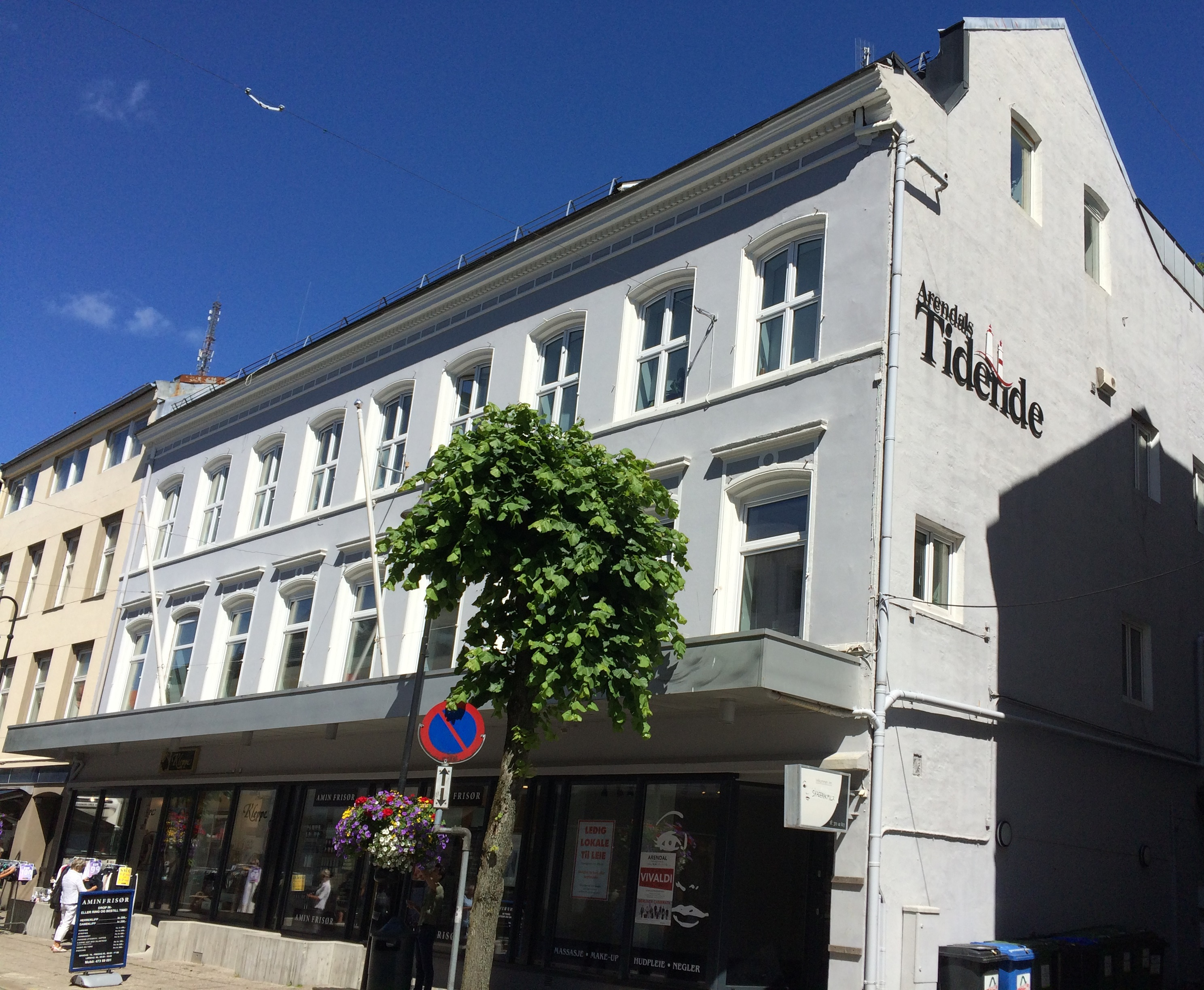
- Arendals Tidende office
- Type: Local newspaper
- Format: Tabloid
- Editor: Nils Petter Vigerstøl (interim)
- Founded: 2005; 21 years ago
- Political alignment: Independent
- Language: Norwegian
- Headquarters: Arendal
- Circulation: 1,477 (2015)
- Website: https://arendalstidende.no/

Arendals Tidende (The Arendal Times) is a local newspaper published in Arendal weekly on Tuesdays.

In previous years, Arendals Tidende was issued as an ordinary newspaper on Mondays and a second issue in glossy magazine format on Fridays.

The newspaper covers Arendal Municipality, mainly writing about cultural and political themes. It was launched in the fall of 2005 as a sample edition. Since January 1, 2006 it has been published as a subscription newspaper.

Arendals Tidende is a politically independent publication that follows the Ethical Code of Practice for the Norwegian Press. Nils Petter Vigerstøl started the paper as chief editor, and was succeeded by Morten Kraft in 2012. In 2013, Grete Helgebø (then Aronsen Husebø) became one of the youngest chief editors in Norway at 22 when she replaced Kraft.

In 2006, Arendals Tidende was the fastest-growing newspaper in the Agder district. In April 2007, the newspaper won the National Association of Local Newspapers concept award for its summer show Pearls of Arendal.

During 2007–2012, the paper was produced at the Arendal train station. At that time, the paper functioned as an agent for Norwegian State Railways and was responsible for employing a former railway employee. As a result, the station was still staffed on weekdays, and the waiting room was open on weekends.

The board of Arendals Tidende filed for bankruptcy on April 25, 2012. After the bankruptcy, the paper entered a significant partnership with Tvende Media and moved into new premises on Havnegaten.

The paper launched its online edition in 2014.

In 2020, Helgebø filed a lawsuit against the newspaper’s owner after she and two journalists were laid off during the pandemic, while the newspaper was run on a volunteer basis by Odd Bjørn Jensen, the general manager of the owning company Tvende Media, and former editor Vigerstøl. After several rounds in the legal system, all the way to the Supreme Court and back to the District Court, the case was settled in 2022.

== Circulation ==
According to the Norwegian Audit Bureau of Circulations and the National Association of Local Newspapers, Arendals Tidende has had the following annual circulation:

- 2006: 2,067
- 2007: 2,136
- 2008: 2,377
- 2009: 2,381
- 2010: 2,010
- 2011: 2,075
- 2012: 1,817
- 2013: 1,719
- 2014: 1,655
- 2015: 1,477
- 2016: 998
