= Tysse =

Tysse may refer to:

== Places ==
- Tysse, Vestland, the administrative centre of Samnanger municipality in Vestland county, Norway
- Tysse, or Tysso, a village in Osterøy municipality in Vestland county, Norway

== People ==
- Erik Tysse (born 1980), a Norwegian race walker (brother of Kjersti Tysse Plätzer)
- Kjersti Tysse Plätzer (born 1972), a Norwegian race walker, who won the silver medal at the 2000 Summer Olympics in Sydney
- Hallvard Tysse, editor of the newspaper, Bygdanytt

== See also ==
- Tyssedal
- Toronto–York Spadina Subway Extension
