= Klar Tale (newspaper) =

Norwegian newspaper

Klar Tale (Clear Speech) is Norway's only easy-to-read newspaper. The newspaper tries to make the news understandable to all. The language is simple and the print is larger than in other newspapers.

Klar Tale is published every week, with 12 pages of news and other current material from Norway and the world. The newspaper also has a Braille edition, is recorded on CD, and is available as a podcast.

The company Mediehuset has editorial responsibility for the newspaper. Klar Tale is religiously and politically independent. Its editor is Kristin Steien Bratlie.

== History ==
The first issue of Klar Tale was released on 11 October 1990 in partnership between the Norwegian News Agency (NTB) and the newspaper Indre Smaalenenes Avis as an experiment that would last two years. Two journalists from NTB, Kari Lindebrække and Anne Kari Berg, would act as editors, with Hans Erik Matre of NTB acting as chief editor. Indre would print and distribute Klar Tale. It was to be released ad-free weekly, with additional editions released in braille writing and through audio cassette. It was advertised as the "first easy read newspaper in Norway" for the "many Norwegians with reading disabilities". Nye Troms journalist Sverre Monssen described the issue as using short sentences with few difficult words, and described it as easy to understand where one article ended and where another began. The newspaper was based on similar initiatives in Sweden and Finland. Issues published in 1990 were to be released free-of-charge for those who paid for 1991 subscriptions.

== Circulation ==
According to the Norwegian Media Businesses' Association, Klar Tale has had the following annual circulation:

- 2006: 13,294
- 2007: 13,090
- 2008: 11,637
- 2009: 12,472
- 2010: 12,823
- 2011: 12,228
- 2012: 12,244
- 2013: 12,021
- 2014: 11,920
- 2015: 10,978
- 2016: 10,750
