= Søvesten =

Norwegian newspaper

Søvesten (The Southwest) is a local Norwegian newspaper published in Kyrksæterøra in Trøndelag county. The newspaper was launched in 1994. It appears once a week, on Thursdays. It is edited by May S. Bjørkaas.

== Circulation ==
According to the Norwegian Audit Bureau of Circulations and National Association of Local Newspapers, Søvesten has had the following annual circulation:

- 2004: 1,591
- 2005: 1,572
- 2006: 1,600
- 2007: 1,563
- 2008: 1,595
- 2009: 1,490
- 2010: 1,502
- 2011: 1,492
- 2012: 1,408
- 2013: 1,349
- 2014: 1,317
- 2015: 1,293
- 2016: 1,244
