= Vestlandsnytt =

Newspaper in Norway

Vestlandsnytt (lit. 'The Western Norway Gazette') is a local Norwegian newspaper published in Fosnavåg in Møre og Romsdal county.

The paper is published in Nynorsk and is edited by Endre Vorren. It is issued twice a week, on Tuesdays and Fridays. Its primary coverage area is Herøy Municipality and Sande Municipality. The newspaper was launched in 1935 by Olav Aurvoll. After Aurvoll, the paper's ownership and operations were taken over by Frantz Frantzen. Today his son, Fred Frantzen Jr., is the paper's owner and manager. Vestlandsnytt has its main office in Fosnavåg and a branch office in Larsnes.

== Circulation ==
According to the Norwegian Audit Bureau of Circulations and National Association of Local Newspapers, Vestlandsnytt has had the following annual circulation:

- 2006: 5,357
- 2007: 5,393
- 2008: 5,406
- 2009: 5,320
- 2010: 5,228
- 2011: 5,120
- 2012: 5,040
- 2013: 4,884
- 2014: 4,767
- 2015: 4,652
- 2016: 4,320
