= Vestavind =

Norwegian newspaper

Vestavind (The West Wind) is a local Norwegian newspaper published in Sveio in Vestland county.

The newspaper appears once a week and covers events in the municipality of Sveio. It is published in Nynorsk and is edited by Irene Flatnes Haldin. Gunn Bjørgen is in charge of accounting, finances, and subscriptions. Bernhard Hegglund is the chairman of the company Vestavind AS. Prominent journalists that have worked for Vestavind include Irene Jacobsen, Mona Terjesen, Sigurd Olav Larsen, and Ellen Tveit.

== History ==
Vestavind was launched in 1986 as a simple A3 sheet and distributed for free, sponsored by advertisements. Later the number of pages grew, and now the paper usually has 20 to 24 pages. In October 2010, Mona Terjesen agreed to a temporary position as editor of the paper. In January 2012 she was succeeded by Irene Flatnes Haldin.

== Editors ==
- Eva Sternhoff Austvik, 1986–1989
- Per A. Enge
- Ingeborg Marie Jensen
- Margrethe Hegland (Langebo)
- Sigurd Olav Larsen
- Sveio Olav Hansen
- Ellen Tveit
- Irene Jacobsen
- Mona Terjesen, 2010–2011
- Irene Flatnes Haldin, 2012–

== Circulation ==
According to the Norwegian Audit Bureau of Circulations and National Association of Local Newspapers, Vestavind has had the following annual circulation:

- 2004: 1,229
- 2005: 1,426
- 2006: 1,540
- 2007: 1,481
- 2008: 1,599
- 2009: 1,572
- 2010: 1,664
- 2011: 1,621
- 2012: 1,615
- 2013: 1,647
- 2014: 1,662
- 2015: 1,587
- 2016: 1,603
