= Stangeavisa =

Norwegian newspaper

Stangeavisa (lit. 'The Stange Gazette') is a local Norwegian newspaper published once a week in Stangebyen in Innlandet county. The newspaper covers events in Stange Municipality. The paper is edited by Lars Kristian Seierstad, who is also the single shareholder in the publishing company. The newspaper was established in 2004.

== Circulation ==
According to the Norwegian Audit Bureau of Circulations and National Association of Local Newspapers, Stangeavisa has had the following annual circulation:

- 2005: 1,253
- 2006: 1,463
- 2007: 2,007
- 2008: 2,516
- 2009: 2,788
- 2010: 2,820
- 2011: 2,692
- 2012: 2,752
- 2013: 2,632
- 2014: 2,651
- 2015: 2,569
- 2016: 2,577
- 2020: 2,785
- 2021: 2,862
- 2022: 2,837
- 2023: 2,925
