= Vennesla Tidende =

Norwegian newspaper

Vennesla Tidende (The Vennesla Times) is a local Norwegian newspaper published in Vennesla which is located in Vennesla Municipality in Agder county, Norway. The newspaper was launched in 1989 and is published twice a week. It is edited by Christopher Johansen.

== Circulation ==
According to the Norwegian Audit Bureau of Circulations and National Association of Local Newspapers, Vennesla Tidende has had the following annual circulation:

- 2006: 3,021
- 2007: 3,118
- 2008: 3,107
- 2009: 3,033
- 2010: 2,988
- 2011: 3,053
- 2012: 2,958
- 2013: 2,941
- 2014: 2,916
- 2015: 3,122
- 2016: 2,948
