= Ryfylke (newspaper) =

Norwegian newspaper

Ryfylke is a local Norwegian newspaper published in Sauda Municipality in Rogaland county.

The newspaper was launched in 1926. The paper originally appeared once a week, and in 1979 it started being published twice a week. It currently appears on Tuesdays and Fridays. The newspaper is owned by the company LL Ryfylke and is edited by Edd Meby. The company has been privately owned since 1926, and none of the owners hold a share greater than five percent. The newspaper has five employees and has a turnover of around NOK 7.5 million in 2013. The newspaper's main office is at the express boat wharf outside the center of Sauda. The newspaper mainly covers news in the municipality of Sauda, with some news from the rest of the Ryfylke district. Its subscription rate in Sauda is nearly 100 percent. The paper is published in Nynorsk.

== Circulation ==
According to the Norwegian Audit Bureau of Circulations and National Association of Local Newspapers, Ryfylke has had the following annual circulation:

- 2004: 2,804
- 2005: 2,799
- 2006: 2,814
- 2007: 2,765
- 2008: 2,659
- 2009: 2,665
- 2010: 2,700
- 2011: 2,656
- 2012: 2,559
- 2013: 2,662
- 2014: 2,564
- 2015: 2,538
- 2016: 2,281
