= Sydvesten =

Norwegian weekly newspaper

Sydvesten (The Southwest) is a local Norwegian newspaper published once a week in Bergen in Vestland county.

Sydvesten covers events in the boroughs of Laksevåg and Fyllingsdalen. When the newspaper was launched in 1994, it was originally called Lokalavisen for Fyllingsdalen og Bønes (The Local Newspaper for Fyllingsdalen and Bønes). In March 2002 its coverage expanded to include Laksevåg. From January 25, 2013, to August 2015, Laksevåg was covered by the affiliated paper Lyderhorn, which then folded. Now Sydvesten once again covers both Fyllingsdalen and Laksevåg.

Sydvesten is owned by the company Bydelsavisene Bergen AS and is published every Tuesday, except for four weeks in July.

== Circulation ==
According to the Norwegian Audit Bureau of Circulations and National Association of Local Newspapers, Sydvesten has had the following annual circulation:

- 2004: 2,185
- 2005: 2,352
- 2006: 2,188
- 2007: 2,146
- 2008: 2,031
- 2009: 1,847
- 2010: 1,752
- 2011: 1,756
- 2012: 1,581
- 2013: 1,416
- 2014: 1,180
- 2015: 1,513
- 2016: 1,746
