= Sande Avis =

Norwegian newspaper

Sande Avis (The Sande Gazette) is a local Norwegian newspaper published in the municipality of Sande in Vestfold county.

The newspaper's history goes back to 1981, although it was not until 1993 that it became a weekly subscription publication. In 1999, Sande Avis was purchased by Drammens Tidende. The paper is edited by Hege Frostad Dahle.

== Circulation ==
According to the Norwegian Audit Bureau of Circulations and National Association of Local Newspapers, Sande Avis has had the following annual circulation:

- 2006: 2,342
- 2007: 2,308
- 2008: 2,220
- 2009: 2,217
- 2010: 2,246
- 2011: 2,212
- 2012: 2,281
- 2013: 2,346
- 2014: 2,252
- 2015: 2,127
- 2016: 2,122
