= Nordhordland (newspaper) =

Local newspaper

Nordhordland is a newspaper published in Knarvik, Norway, and covers the district of Nordhordland. Its main competitor is Strilen, which is also published in Knarvik and covers Nordhordland.
