= Marsteinen (newspaper) =

Norwegian local newspaper

- Type: Local newspaper
- Founded: 1978; 48 years ago
- Language: Norwegian
- Headquarters: Storebø, Austevoll Municipality

Marsteinen is a local Norwegian newspaper published in Austevoll Municipality in Vestland county.

Marsteinen was launched in 1978 and is issued once a week, on Thursdays. The newspaper's offices are located in Storebø. Trond Hagenes has served as the paper's editor since 2006. The newspaper was named after the Marstein Lighthouse, which stands in the northwest part of the municipality.

== Circulation ==
According to the Norwegian Audit Bureau of Circulations and National Association of Local Newspapers, Marsteinen has had the following annual circulation:

- 2004: 2,373
- 2005: 2,468
- 2006: 2,286
- 2007: 2,402
- 2008: 2,307
- 2009: 2,344
- 2010: 2,365
- 2011: 2,368
- 2012: 2,367
- 2013: 2,349
- 2014: 2,329
- 2015: 2,261
- 2016: 2,162
