= Vestnesavisa =

Norwegian newspaper

Vestnesavisa (lit. 'The Vestnes Gazette') is a local Norwegian newspaper published in Vestnes Municipality in Møre og Romsdal county.

The newspaper was established in 1987. It is managed by Jon Ragnar Halkjelsvik and edited by Helene Henriksen. Vestnesavisa is published once a week, on Wednesdays.

== Circulation ==
According to the Norwegian Audit Bureau of Circulations and National Association of Local Newspapers, Vestnesavisa has had the following annual circulation:

- 2004: 1,922
- 2005: 1,902
- 2006: 1,933
- 2007: 1,935
- 2008: 1,909
- 2009: 1,956
- 2010: 1,934
- 2011: 1,926
- 2012: 1,900
- 2013: 1,859
- 2014: 1,851
- 2015: 1,827
- 2016: 1,741
