= Nesttun =

- Neighborhood in Bergen
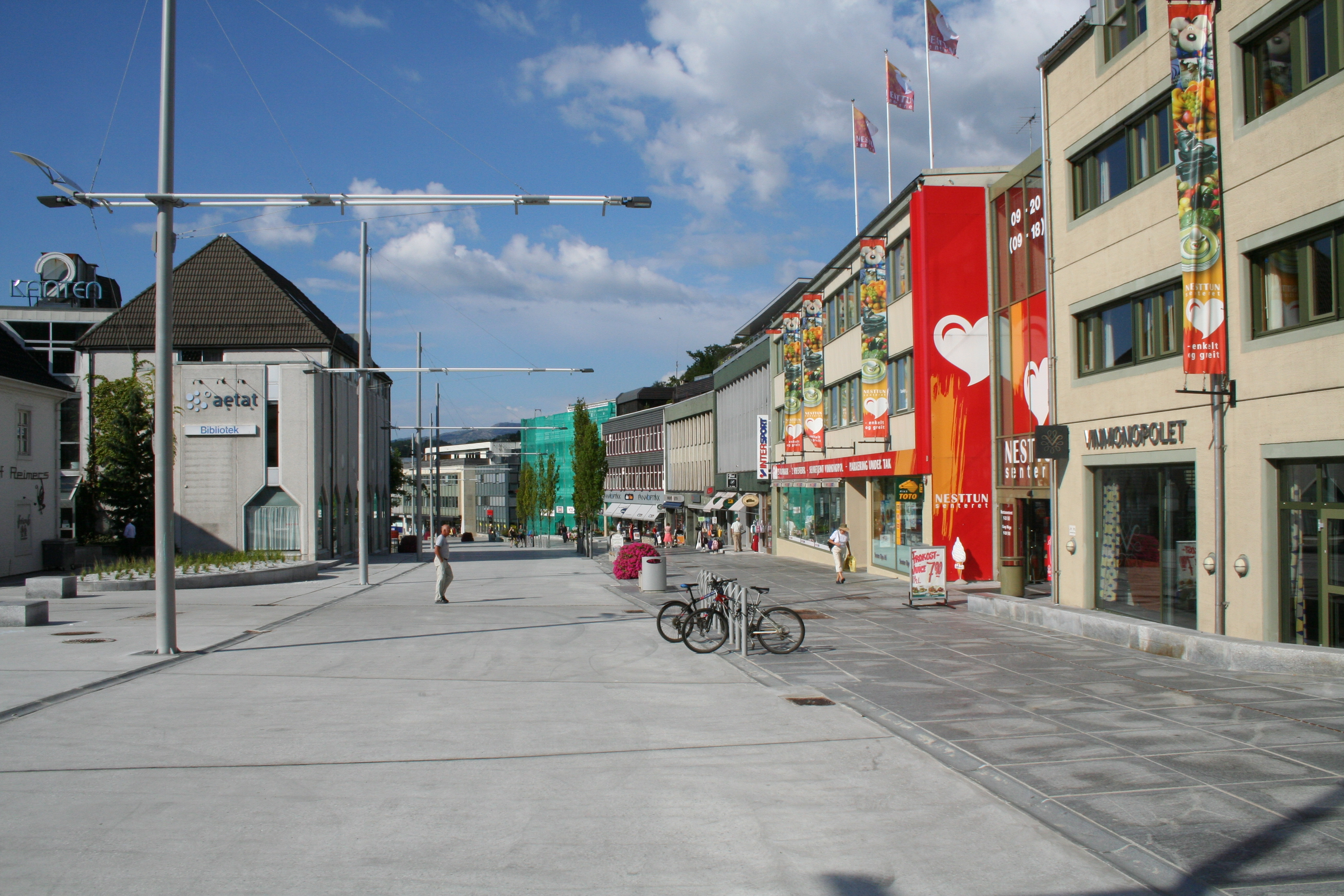
- To the left: foundation for the tracks of the now completed Bergen Light Rail system. To the right, pedestrian street outside shopping center NesttunSenteret
- Interactive map of Nesttun
- Coordinates: 60.3163°N 5.3543°E
- Country: Norway
- Region: Western Norway
- County: Vestland
- Municipality: Bergen
- Borough: Fana
- Elevation: 26 m (85 ft)
- Time zone: UTC+01:00 (CET)
  - Summer (DST): UTC+02:00 (CEST)

Nesttun is an urban settlement in the borough of Fana in Bergen Municipality in Vestland county, Norway. It is located approximately 10 kilometres (6.2 mi) south of the city centre of Bergen. It was the centre of the old Fana Municipality, which merged with Bergen Municipality in 1972, and is today the centre of the borough of Fana. Nesttun contains a mall, several smaller shops, a library, and Birkeland Church.

== Climate ==
A problem facing Nesttun is flooding after heavy rain. In 2005, heavy rain caused the river that flows through the town to break its banks. A 2014 article in Fanaposten said that the municipality has taken too few measures to avoid flooding of the magnitude of the 2005 flooding.

== Transport ==
Until the opening of the Ulriken Tunnel in 1964, Nesttun was a station on the Bergensbanen railway, and a station on the Nesttun-Osbanen railway until its closure in 1935. After lengthy construction work, the two double-lane roads which went through the centre of Nesttun were converted into a pedestrian mall and a single-lane road. Nesttun is a major traffic junction of the Bergen area, and this status was strengthened in 2010, when the first phase of the Bergen Light Rail system is completed. Buses to the city centre of Bergen depart Nesttun every five minutes.

== Culture ==
=== Education ===
There are several schools in the immediate vicinity of Nesttun. Midtun skole and Slåtthaug ungdomsskole are located directly to the south, the former being an elementary school and the latter a lower secondary school. Ulsmåg skole, an elementary school, is located to the east of Nesttun. The closest upper secondary schools are Fana gymnas, the Rudolf Steiner school of Bergen, and Slåtthaug videregående skole, as well as Bjørkåsen videregående skole, a special school for deaf students.
