= Østerdølen =

Norwegian newspaper

Østerdølen (lit. 'the Østerdal Resident') is a local Norwegian newspaper published in Stor-Elvdal Municipality in Innlandet county.

The newspaper was established in August 1999 and is published once a week in Koppang. It covers events in the municipalities of Stor-Elvdal, Engerdal, Rendalen, and Åmot. The editor of the paper is Njaal Kværnes. Østerdølen received an award for having the best front page in 2001 in the competition Årets Forside (lit. 'Front Page of the Year').

== Circulation ==
According to the Norwegian Audit Bureau of Circulations and National Association of Local Newspapers, Øksnesavisa has had the following annual circulation:

- 2003: 1,446
- 2004: 1,407
- 2005: 1,243
- 2006: 1,210
- 2007: 1,201
- 2008: 1,016
- 2009: 1,010
- 2010: 1,006
- 2011: 894
- 2012: 915
- 2013: 826
- 2014: 787
- 2015: 710
- 2016: 806
