= Selbyggen =

Norwegian newspaper

Selbyggen (lit. 'The Selbu Resident') is a local Norwegian newspaper covering Selbu Municipality and Tydal Municipality in Trøndelag county. The newspaper has been published since June 9, 1889, when it was started by the brothers John and Ola Aas, with a hiatus from 1941 to 1947. The newspaper is published every Friday. It is edited by Bodil Uthus.

== Circulation ==
According to the Norwegian Audit Bureau of Circulations and National Association of Local Newspapers, Selbyggen has had the following annual circulation:

- 2004: 3,207
- 2005: 3,290
- 2006: 3,251
- 2007: 3,267
- 2008: 3,306
- 2009: 3,227
- 2010: 3,262
- 2011: 3,181
- 2012: 3,121
- 2013: 3,039
- 2014: 2,981
- 2015: 3,118
- 2016: 3,084
