= Gaula (newspaper) =

Norwegian newspaper

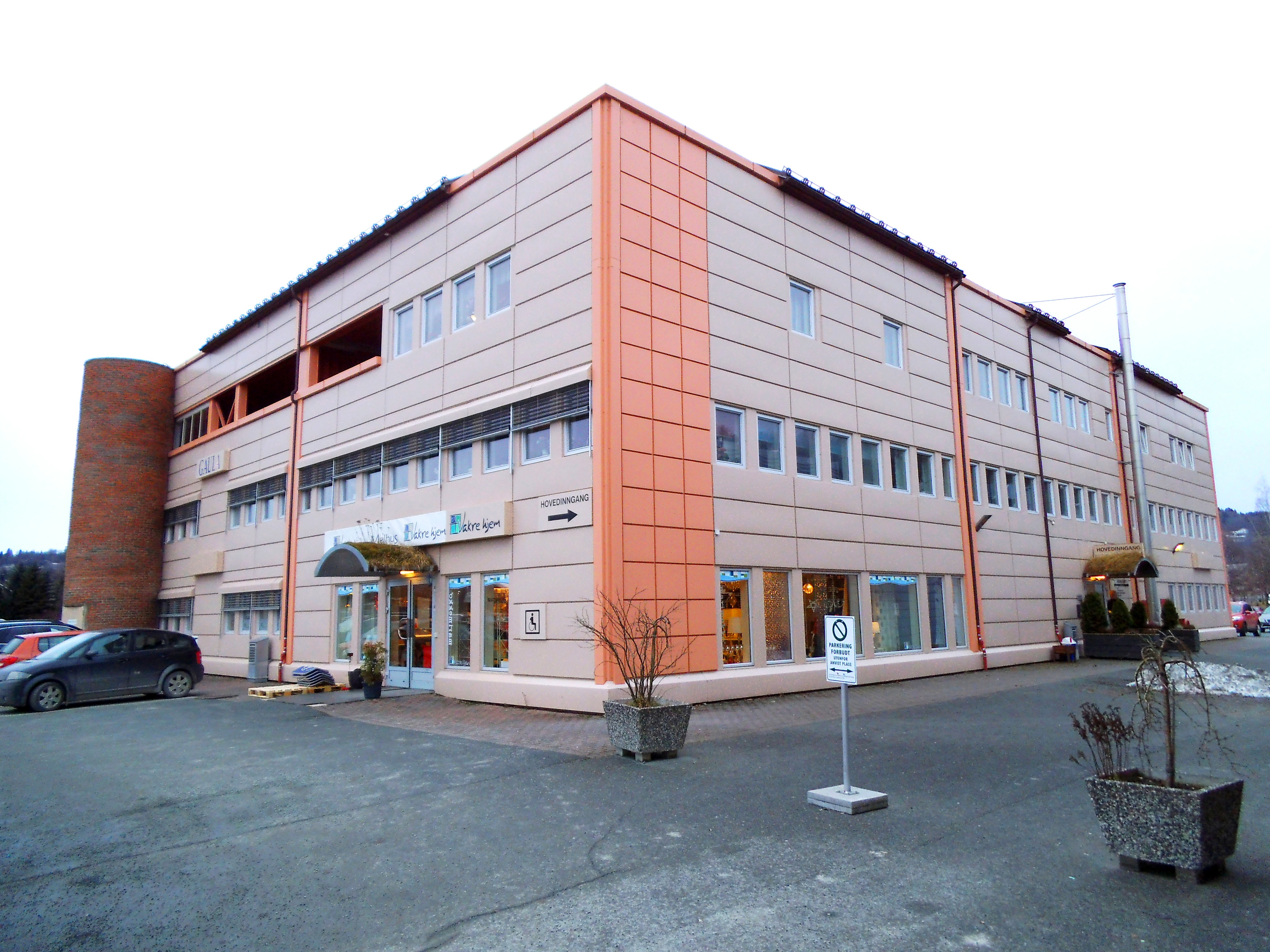
Gaula's offices are on the second floor of the Melhuset office building in Melhus.

Gaula is a local Norwegian newspaper, published on Wednesdays in Melhus Municipality in Trøndelag county. It also covers news from the neighboring Midtre Gauldal Municipality and Trondheim Municipality. The newspaper was established in 2001. Its editor is Åsmund Snøfugl and it is published on Wednesdays. The newspaper's offices are located in the Melhuset office building in downtown Melhus.

== Circulation ==
According to the Norwegian Audit Bureau of Circulations and National Association of Local Newspapers, Gaula has had the following annual circulation:

- 2004: 1,474
- 2005: 1,675
- 2006: 1,697
- 2007: 1,703
- 2008: 1,538
- 2009: 1,549
- 2010: 1,585
- 2011: 1,452
- 2012: 1,448
- 2013: 1,347
- 2014: 1,521
- 2015: 1,515
- 2016: 1,638
