= VaksdalPosten =

Norwegian newspaper

VaksdalPosten (lit. 'The Vaksdal Gazette') is a local Norwegian newspaper published once a week in Dale in Vestland county.

The paper covers events in Vaksdal Municipality and Modalen Municipality. The newspaper was established in 1987 and is published in Nynorsk. The paper is edited by Esben Hesjedal.

== Circulation ==
According to the Norwegian Audit Bureau of Circulations and National Association of Local Newspapers, VaksdalPosten has had the following annual circulation:

- 2004: 2,401
- 2005: 2,397
- 2006: 2,395
- 2007: 2,405
- 2008: 2,339
- 2009: 2,326
- 2010: 2,306
- 2011: 2,270
- 2012: 2,250
- 2013: 2,253
- 2014: 2,295
- 2015: 2,273
- 2016: 2,143
