= Bø blad =

Norwegian local newspaper

Bø blad (lit. 'The Bø Gazette') is a local Norwegian newspaper in Midt-Telemark Municipality in Telemark county.

The newspaper was established in 1986 by Arne Kielland, a former Storting representative for the Labor Party and Socialist Left Party. The paper is published in Nynorsk and is issued 48 times a year. Among other things, Bø blad is known for its long headlines and the humorous column "Lensmannsrunden" (The Lensmann's Round).

== Editors ==
- Arne Kielland (1986–2003)
- Tone Anne Ødegård (2003–2006)
- Hilde Eika Nesje (November 2006–)

== Circulation ==
According to the Norwegian Audit Bureau of Circulations and the National Association of Local Newspapers, Bø blad has had the following annual circulation:

- 2006: 2,371
- 2007: 2,355
- 2008: 2,367
- 2009: 2,355
- 2010: 2,325
- 2011: 2,257
- 2012: 2,359
- 2013: 2,501
- 2014: 2,622
- 2015: 2,542
- 2016: 2,567
