= Samningen =

Norwegian newspaper

Samningen (lit. 'The Samnanger Resident') is a local Norwegian newspaper published in Samnanger Municipality in Vestland county. The paper was established in 1977 and is published weekly, on Thursdays. It is edited by Hallvard Tysse. The paper's office is located in Årland.

== Circulation ==
According to the Norwegian Audit Bureau of Circulations and National Association of Local Newspapers, Samningen has had the following annual circulation:

- 2004: 1,339
- 2005: 1,360
- 2006: 1,374
- 2007: 1,380
- 2008: 1,387
- 2009: 1,375
- 2010: 1,393
- 2011: 1,418
- 2012: 1,404
- 2013: 1,419
- 2014: 1,438
- 2015: 1,433
- 2016: 1,424
