= Kyst og Fjord =

Norwegian fishermen's newspaper

Kyst og Fjord (transl. Coast and Fjord) is a Norwegian fishermen's newspaper headquartered in Kjøllefjord in Lebesby Municipality in Finnmark county.

The newspaper is published weekly and was launched in fall 2011. After its first full year of operation, Kyst og Fjord attained a circulation of 1,312. Kyst og Fjord also issues an online newspaper that is updated daily with news from the seafood industry. The newspaper also has local offices in Tromsø and Sortland. The newspaper is a member of the National Association of Local Newspapers. The paper's editor and general manager is Øystein Ingilæ.

== Circulation ==
According to the Norwegian Media Businesses' Association, Kyst og Fjord has had the following annual circulation:

- 2012: 1,312
- 2013: 1,536
- 2014: 1,824
- 2015: 1,765
- 2016: 1,702
