= Øyposten =

Norwegian newspaper

Øyposten (lit. 'The Island Post') is a local Norwegian newspaper published in the borough of Finnøy in Stavanger Municipality, Rogaland county. The newspaper was established in 1970 as a municipal newsletter, and it became an independent newspaper in 1999. Its offices are located in Judaberg. The paper is published in Nynorsk and it is edited by Jon Asgaut Flesjå.

== Circulation ==
According to the Norwegian Audit Bureau of Circulations and National Association of Local Newspapers, Øyposten has had the following annual circulation:

- 2004: 1,157
- 2005: 1,157
- 2006: 1,191
- 2007: 1,254
- 2008: 1,312
- 2009: 1,390
- 2010: 1,458
- 2011: 1,430
- 2012: 1,462
- 2013: 1,429
- 2014: 1,391
- 2015: 1,381
- 2016: 1,323
