= Hammerfestingen =

Norwegian newspaper

Hammerfestingen is a local Norwegian newspaper in Finnmark county.

The paper is published weekly in Hammerfest Municipality, and it first appeared on December 22, 2011. Caroline Greiner started the paper and was the editor until 2017 when Bjørn Egil Jakobsen was appointed editor. The paper is a member of the National Association of Local Newspapers.

In 2022, Amedia became the major shareholder.

== Circulation ==
According to the Norwegian Audit Bureau of Circulations and National Association of Local Newspapers, Hammerfestingen has had the following annual circulation:

- 2012: 1,132
- 2013: 1,194
- 2014: 1,330
- 2015: 1,209
- 2016: 1,235
