= Våganavisa =

Newspaper in Nordland county, Norway

Våganavisa (The Vågan Gazette) is a local Norwegian newspaper published in the town of Svolvær in Vågan Municipality in Nordland county.

The paper was launched on November 1, 2006 and it appears once a week. It is owned and edited by Mari Rokkan. Edd Meby served as the editor until 2016. In 2009, Våganavisa was named Local Newspaper of the Year by the National Association of Local Newspapers.

== Circulation ==
According to the Norwegian Audit Bureau of Circulations and National Association of Local Newspapers, Våganavisa has had the following annual circulation:

- 2007: 1,743
- 2008: 2,067
- 2009: 2,040
- 2010: 2,295
- 2011: 2,359
- 2012: 2,543
- 2013: 2,563
- 2014: 2,477
- 2015: 2,460
- 2016: 2,326
