= Røyken og Hurums Avis =

Norwegian newspaper

Røyken og Hurums Avis (The Røyken and Hurum Gazette) is a local Norwegian newspaper covering the municipalities of Røyken and Hurum in Buskerud county.

Røyken og Hurums Avis was launched in 1976, when it was called Hurumposten (The Hurum Gazette), later renamed Smånytt fra Røyken og Hurum (Little Gazette from Røyken and Hurum). The newspaper is published twice a week, on Tuesdays and Thursdays. Its office has been located in Sætre since 2003, after it moved from Slemmestad. It is edited by Svein Ove Isaksen. Røyken og Hurums Avis is fully owned by Drammens Tidende, which is part of the company Edda Media.

== Circulation ==
According to the Norwegian Audit Bureau of Circulations and National Association of Local Newspapers, Røyken og Hurums Avis has had the following annual circulation:

- 2006: 3,193
- 2007: 3,192
- 2008: 3,391
- 2009: 3,541
- 2010: 3,711
- 2011: 3,695
- 2012: 3,790
- 2013: 3,872
- 2014: 3,668
- 2015: 3,639
- 2016: 3,572
