= Åmliavisa =

Norwegian newspaper

Åmliavisa (lit. 'The Åmli Gazette') is a local Norwegian weekly newspaper covering Åmli Municipality in Agder county and neighboring areas. It was first published in March 2008. The newspaper was named Nynorsk User of the Year in 2008. Esben Holm Eskelund edited the paper from 2014 to 2015, and was succeeded by Camilla Glad in April 2015. It is issued every Tuesday.

The newspaper is owned by the company ÅmliAvisa AS, which has 164 shareholders, including individuals, organizations, businesses, and the municipality.

== Editors ==
- Inger Stavelin (2008–2010)
- Peter Svalheim (2010–2013)
- Esben Holm Eskelund (2014–2015)
- Camilla Glad (2015–)

== Circulation ==
According to the Norwegian Audit Bureau of Circulations and the National Association of Local Newspapers, Åmliavisa has had the following annual circulation:

- 2008: 1,281
- 2009: 1,521
- 2010: 1,517
- 2011: 1,415
- 2012: 1,416
- 2013: 1,363
- 2014: 1,264
- 2015: 1,229
- 2016: 1,215
