= Solabladet =

Norwegian newspaper

Solabladet (lit. 'The Sola Gazette') is a local Norwegian newspaper published in Sola Municipality in Rogaland county.

Solabladet is owned by Amedia and is politically independent. The newspaper was launched on January 24, 1991, and its office is located in Solakrossen. It is published in a paper edition on Thursdays and online every day at solabladet.no. The paper is edited by Helene Pahr-Iversen, who succeeded Bernt Eirik Rød after his unexpected death in 2014.

== Circulation ==
According to the Norwegian Audit Bureau of Circulations and National Association of Local Newspapers, Solabladet has had the following annual circulation:

- 2006: 3,870
- 2007: 4,057
- 2008: 4,249
- 2009: 3,930
- 2010: 3,972
- 2011: 3,926
- 2012: 3,812
- 2013: 3,783
- 2014: 3,663
- 2015: 3,678
- 2016: 3,530
