= Drangedalsposten =

Norwegian newspaper

Drangedalsposten (lit. 'The Drangedal Gazette') is a local Norwegian newspaper published in Drangedal Municipality in Telemark county.

The newspaper is published every Thursday and it was founded by the local community in 1999 after the Orkla Group purchased and then incorporated the newspaper Drangedal Blad into Kragerø Blad Vestmar. The editor of the paper is Gry Rønjum.

== Circulation ==
According to the Norwegian Audit Bureau of Circulations and National Association of Local Newspapers, Drangedalsposten has had the following annual circulation:

- 2004: 1,963
- 2005: 1,988
- 2006: 1,980
- 2007: 1,952
- 2008: 1,970
- 2009: 1,954
- 2010: 1,905
- 2011: 1,907
- 2012: 1,941
- 2013: 1,946
- 2014: 2,096
- 2015: 2,060
- 2016: 1,919
