= Svelviksposten =

Norwegian newspaper

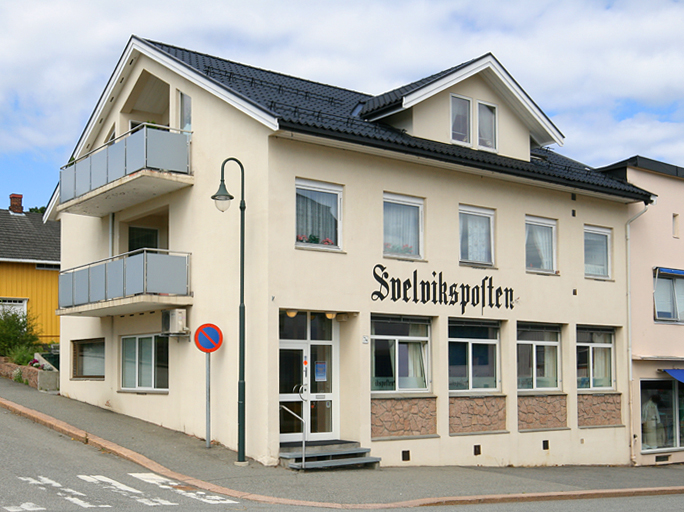
Svelviksposten office in Svelvik

Svelviksposten (The Svelvik Gazette) is a local Norwegian newspaper published once a week in the town of Svelvik in Buskerud county.

== Circulation ==
According to the Norwegian Audit Bureau of Circulations and National Association of Local Newspapers, Svelviksposten has had the following annual circulation:

- 2006: 2,651
- 2007: 2,554
- 2008: 2,518
- 2009: 2,525
- 2010: 2,515
- 2011: 2,392
- 2012: 2,348
- 2013: 2,309
- 2014: 2,250
- 2015: 2,090
- 2016: 2,127
- 2017: 2 112:
