= Vigga =

Norwegian newspaper

Vigga is a local Norwegian newspaper published in Dombås in Innlandet county.

Vigga is a regional newspaper, mainly covering events in Lesja Municipality and Dovre Municipality. Until 2012, it also had an office in Otta in order to cover a wider area including Sel Municipality and the municipalities along the Ottadalen river. Vigga was established in 1987 by the married couple Marit and Asbjørn Amble.

The name originates in the local term "vigga", referring to the zone where the trees can no longer grow; where the forest ends and the landscape transitions into more barren steppe or tundra like conditions typical for the mountainous areas of the region.

== Circulation ==
According to the Norwegian Audit Bureau of Circulations and National Association of Local Newspapers, Vigga has had the following annual circulation:

- 1990: 1,600
- 1995: 1,135
- 2000: 1,775
- 2005: 2,325
- 2006: 2,465
- 2007: 2,629
- 2008: 2,414
- 2009: 2,293
- 2010: 2,421
- 2011: 2,283
- 2012: 2,265
- 2013: 2,242
- 2014: 2,189
- 2015: 2,186
- 2016: 2,120
- 2020: 2,296
- 2021: 2,402
- 2022: 2,292
- 2023: 2,476
