= SortlandsAvisa =

Norwegian newspaper

SortlandsAvisa (The Sortland Gazette) is a local Norwegian newspaper published in Sortland Municipality in Nordland county.

SortlandsAvisa is a politically independent newspaper. It is published every Thursday, and is edited by Geir Bjørn Nilsen. The newspaper was launched on January 10, 2008. The founder of SortlandsAvisa and its first editor was Gard Lehne Borch Michalsen, who now heads the media site Medier24. The newspaper is printed by HTG Trykk AS in Harstad.

== Editors ==
- January 2008 – September 2013: Gard Borch Michalsen
- September 2013 – December 2013: Erik Jenssen (acting editor)
- January 2013 – July 2016: Thor Anders Angelsen
- July 2016 – December 2016: Sanna Drogset Børstad (acting editor)
- January 2017 – : Geir Bjørn Nilsen

== Circulation ==
According to the Norwegian Audit Bureau of Circulations and National Association of Local Newspapers, SortlandsAvisa has had the following annual circulation:

- 2008: 1,189
- 2009: 1,569
- 2010: 1,598
- 2011: 1,581
- 2012: 1,555
- 2013: 1,534
- 2014: 1,436
- 2015: 1,275
- 2016: 1,178
