= Tysnes (newspaper) =

Norwegian newspaper

Tysnes is a local Norwegian newspaper published in Tysnes Municipality in Vestland county.

The newspaper was established in 1953 as a four-page publication. It was originally issued biweekly, but in 1979 it became a weekly publication, appearing every Thursday.

== Circulation ==
According to the Norwegian Audit Bureau of Circulations and National Association of Local Newspapers, Tysnes has had the following annual circulation:

- 2004: 2,408
- 2005: 2,412
- 2006: 2,435
- 2007: 2,475
- 2008: 2,511
- 2009: 2,446
- 2010: 2,456
- 2011: 2,419
- 2012: 2,344
- 2013: 2,365
- 2014: 2,323
- 2015: 2,259
- 2016: 2,188
