= Suldalsposten =

Norwegian newspaper

Suldalsposten (lit. 'The Suldal Gazette') is a local Norwegian newspaper published in Suldal Municipality in Rogaland county.

The paper covers events in Suldal Municipality and its editorial offices are located in the administrative center of the municipality, Sand. The newspaper was established with municipal support in 1976. In 1998 and 2013, Suldalsposten was named Local Newspaper of the Year by the National Association of Local Newspapers. The paper is currently also distributed free to young people living outside the municipality for school, an apprenticeship, or military service. The paper is published once a week.

== Circulation ==
According to the Norwegian Audit Bureau of Circulations and National Association of Local Newspapers, Suldalsposten has had the following annual circulation:

- 2004: 2,221
- 2005: 2,295
- 2006: 2,348
- 2007: 2,419
- 2008: 2,437
- 2009: 2,423
- 2010: 2,375
- 2011: 2,371
- 2012: 2,311
- 2013: 2,337
- 2014: 2,392
- 2015: 2,347
- 2016: 2,288
