= Sandnesposten =

Norwegian newspaper

Sandnesposten (lit. 'The Sandnes Gazette') is a local Norwegian newspaper published in Sandnes in Rogaland county.

The newspaper was launched in 1990 and is published twice a week, on Tuesdays and Thursdays. It is owned by Nordsjø Media and has eight employees. The editor of the paper has been Frode Myhra Gjerald since January 2014; previously, Gjerald worked as the editor of the newspaper Hordaland in Voss Municipality.

== Circulation ==
According to the Norwegian Audit Bureau of Circulations and National Association of Local Newspapers, Sandnesposten has had the following annual circulation:

- 2006: 3,642
- 2007: 3,971
- 2008: 4,222
- 2009: 4,159
- 2010: 4,192
- 2011: 4,022
- 2012: 4,018
- 2013: 3,995
- 2014: 3,999
- 2015: 4,650
- 2016: 4,566
