= Grannar =

Norwegian newspaper

Grannar (lit. 'Neighbors') is a politically independent local Norwegian newspaper, covering events in Etne Municipality in Vestland county and Vindafjord Municipality in Rogaland county.

Grannar is published two times a week, on Mondays and Thursdays. The newspaper employs 11 people and it is published in Nynorsk. The paper's office is in the village of Etne.

Grannar was originally established as a newspaper for Ølen Municipality (now the northern part of Vindafjord Municipality) and Etne Municipality. The paper then merged with the former local newspaper Vindafjordingen in 1989, after which it also covered events in the municipality of Vindafjord.

The newspaper is edited by Arne Frøkedal.

== Circulation ==
According to the Norwegian Audit Bureau of Circulations and National Association of Local Newspapers, Gauldalsposten has had the following annual circulation:

- 2004: 3,893
- 2005: 3,858
- 2006: 3,875
- 2007: 3,929
- 2008: 3,889
- 2009: 3,852
- 2010: 3,816
- 2011: 3,682
- 2012: 3,548
- 2013: 3,548
- 2014: 3,575
- 2015: 3,582
- 2016: 3,532
