= Storfjordnytt =

Norwegian newspaper

Storfjordnytt (lit. 'The Storfjord News') is a local Norwegian newspaper published once a week in Møre og Romsdal county.

The newspaper is published every Thursday, and it covers news in Fjord Municipality, as well as in the villages of Geiranger and Liabygda in Stranda Municipality. The newspaper was first published as Norddal Bygdeblad on 28 November 1979, but it changed its name to Storfjord-Nytt (and then to Storfjordnytt) when its area of coverage expanded in 1989. The newspaper is edited by Randi Flø. Its offices are located in Sylte.

== Circulation ==
According to the Norwegian Audit Bureau of Circulations and National Association of Local Newspapers, Storfjordnytt has had the following annual circulation:

- 2004: 1,572
- 2005: 1,578
- 2006: 1,585
- 2007: 1,586
- 2008: 1,460
- 2009: 1,452
- 2010: 1,439
- 2011: 1,425
- 2012: 1,378
- 2013: 1,384
- 2014: 1,405
- 2015: 1,354
- 2016: 1,373
