= Askøyværingen =

Norwegian newspaper

Askøyværingen is a local newspaper published in Askøy Municipality, Norway.

== History and profile ==
Askøyværingen was founded in 1978. The newspaper is published twice a week, on Tuesdays and Fridays. It is owned by Lokalavisene, a subsidiary of the owner of Bergens Tidende which also owns Fanaposten and Bygdanytt.

In 2010 Askøyværingen had a circulation of 5,208 copies. The circulation of the paper was 5,108 copies in 2012.
