= Marstein Lighthouse =

Marstein Lighthouse Marstein fyrstasjon
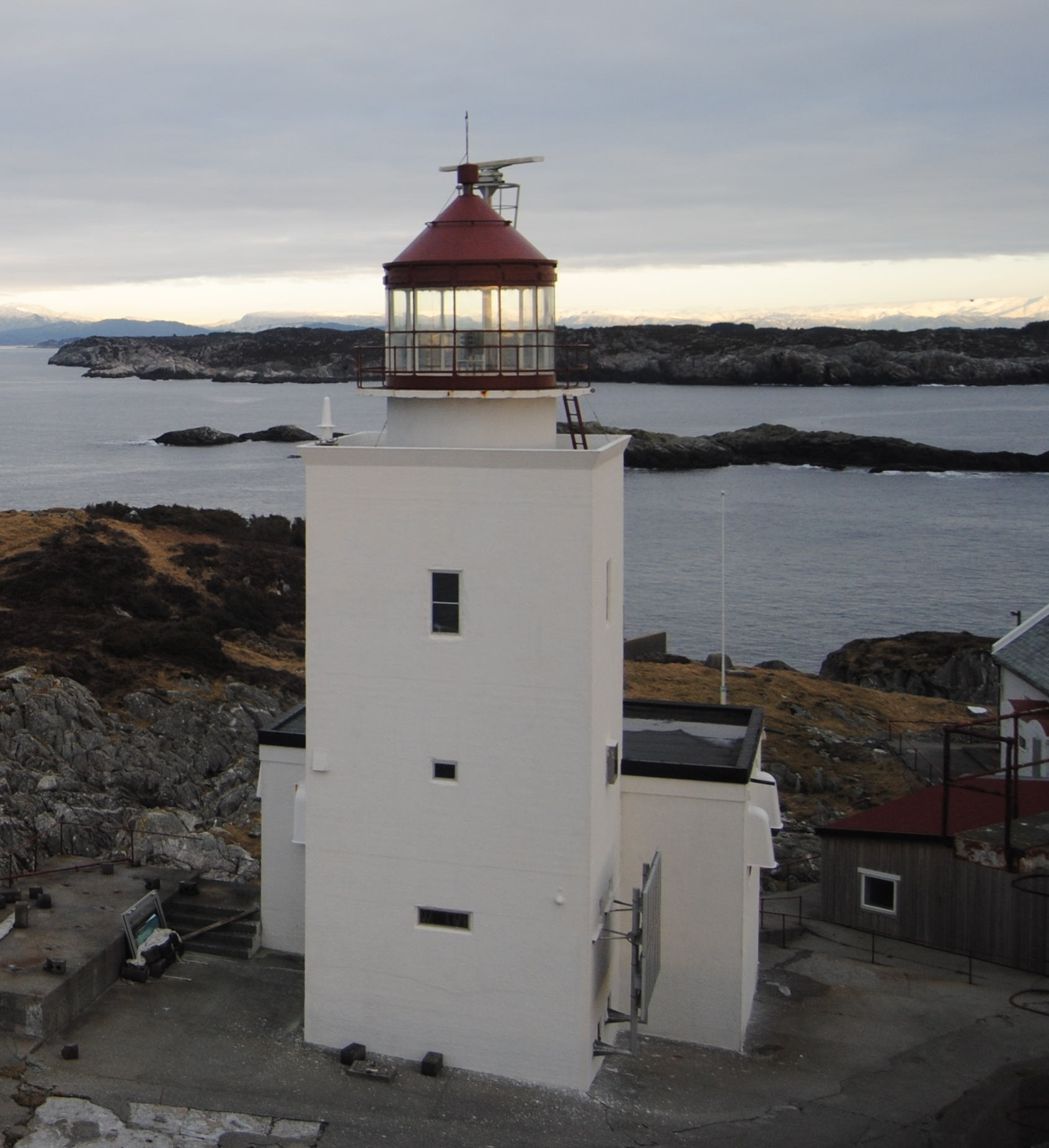
- Marstein Lighthouse
- Location: Marstein Islands, Austevoll Municipality, Norway
- Coordinates: 60°07′48″N 5°00′38″E

Tower
- Constructed: 1877
- Construction: masonry
- Automated: 2002
- Height: 17.3 m (57 ft)
- Shape: square
- Markings: White (tower), red (lantern)
- Racon: M

Light
- First lit: 1950
- Focal height: 38 m (125 ft) (white), 29 m (95 ft) (red)
- Intensity: 840,000 candela
- Range: 17 nmi (31 km; 20 mi) (white), 10.6 nmi (19.6 km; 12.2 mi) (red)
- Characteristic: Iso W 10s, Iso(2) R 4s

Marstein Lighthouse (Norwegian: Marstein fyrstasjon) is an active lighthouse in Austevoll Municipality in Vestland county, Norway. It is located on the small island of Store Marstein just west of the island of Storakalsøy on the south side of the entrance to the Krossfjorden and therefore assists ships going to both the city of Bergen and to the Hardangerfjorden.

== Description ==
The Marstein Lighthouse currently consists of a 17-metre (56 ft) tall square, white, masonry tower with a red roof, and a single-storey service building attached. The light sits at an elevation of 37.5 metres (123 ft) above sea level. It emits a white and red isophase light with a period of 4 seconds. The light has an intensity of 850,000 candela and it can be seen for about 11 nautical miles (20 km; 13 mi). A secondary light is located at an elevation of 29 metres (95 ft) above sea level and that emits a red light, occulting in groups of two.

== History ==
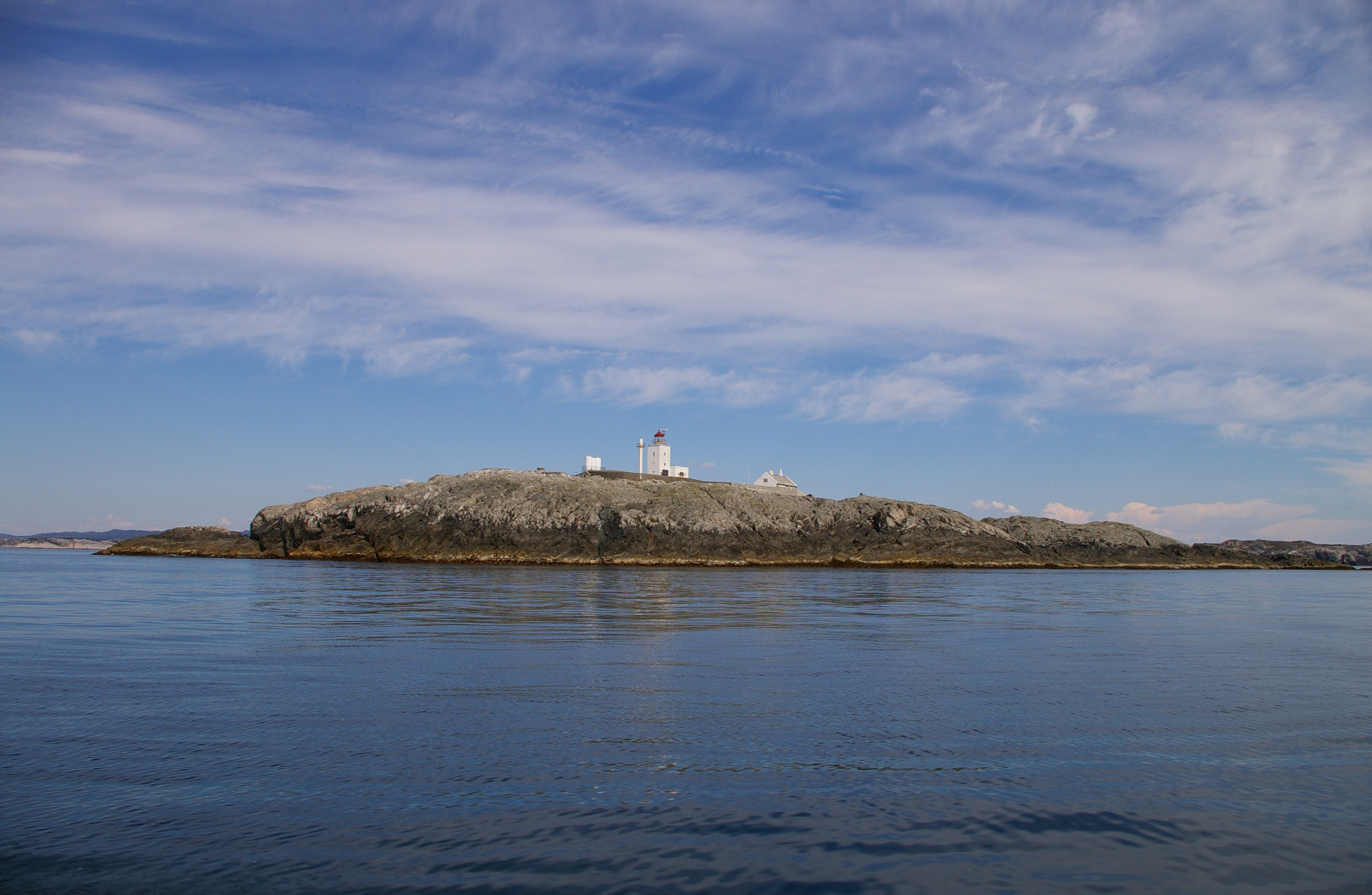
Store Marstein and the Lighthouse on a calm summer day in 2008

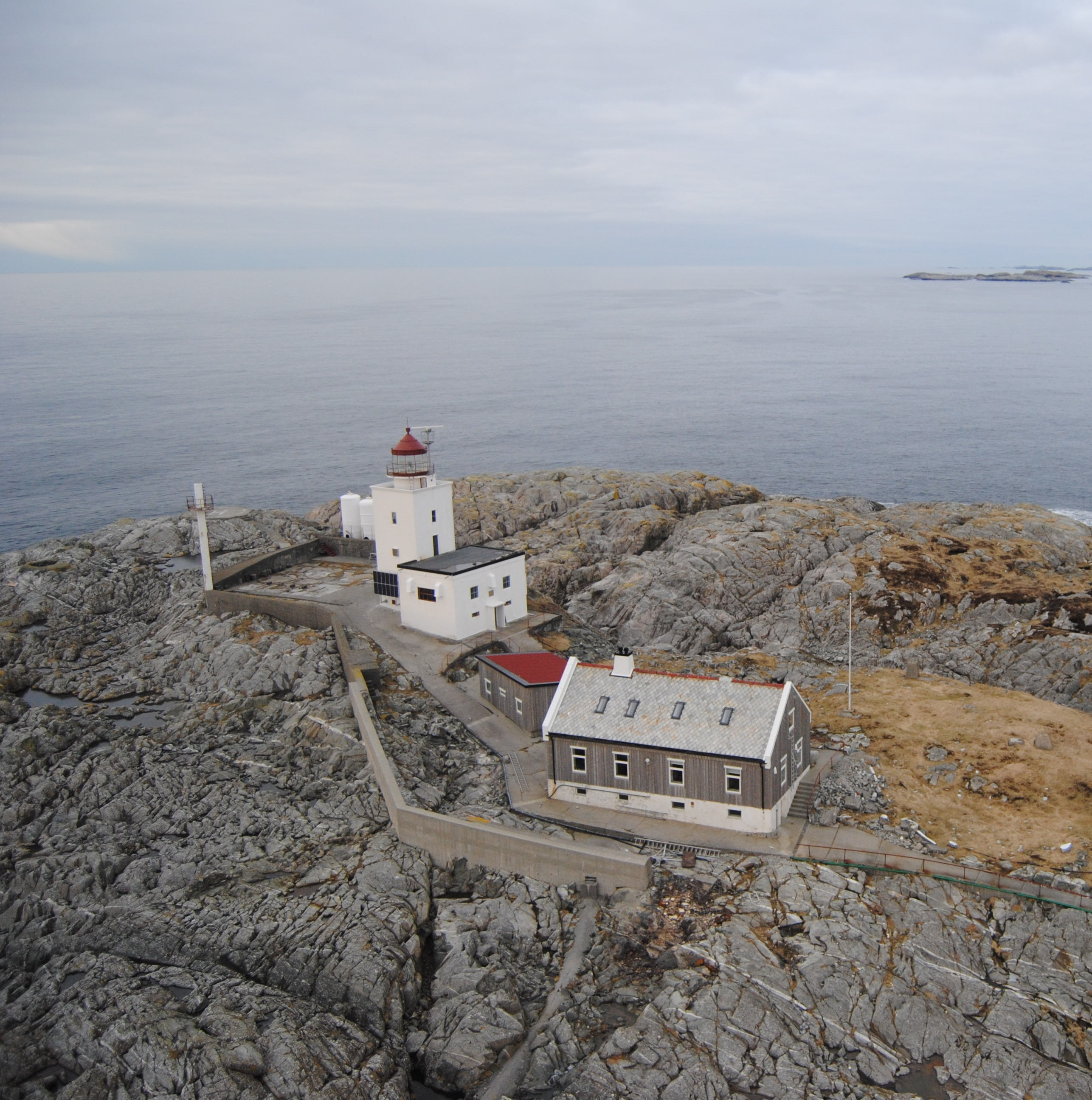
Marstein Lighthouse and Keeper's House

The original octagonal prism-shaped lighthouse was built on this site in 1877. During World War II, the island and lighthouse were occupied by German forces. Allied aircraft bombed the lighthouse on two occasions, 25 July and 1 August 1940, and caused considerable damage. From 1949 to 1950, a new square light tower, a new keeper's house, and a new surrounding, protective, bulkhead were built.

The lighthouse was automated in 1987 and in 2002 the lighthouse keeper position was eliminated and the lighthouse is now controlled electronically from the mainland. In January 2005, a severe storm breached the bulkhead wall and destroyed the keeper's house. After the keeper's house was repaired its ownership was transferred to the local Austevoll Municipality. A hotel now operates the facility as a dependency.

The newspaper Marsteinen was named after the lighthouse in 1978.

== See also ==
- Lighthouses in Norway
- List of lighthouses in Norway
