= Lokalavisa NordSalten =

Norwegian newspaper

Lokalavisa NordSalten (Lule Sami: Bájkkeavijssa NuorttaSáltto; lit. 'The North Salten Local Gazette') is a Norwegian newspaper that covers Steigen Municipality and Hamarøy Municipality in Nordland. The current version of the newspaper was established in 1996, and the first issue was published on January 5 that year. The main office is located in the village of Innhavet in Hamarøy Municipality. The chief editor is Børge Strandskog, who has served since 1996. The newspaper is published in Bokmål with a part in Lule Sami on Fridays. The Lule Sámi material first started publication in January 2003.

A test issue of Lokalavisa NordSalten was produced on May 27, 1982. The issue included a section in Lule Sami written by Sven-Roald Nystø. Another test issue was published in 1983, and then the paper appeared regularly starting in 1984 until it went bankrupt in October 1985.

== Circulation ==
According to the Norwegian Audit Bureau of Circulations and National Association of Local Newspapers, Lokalavisa NordSalten has had the following annual circulation:

- 2004: 2,465
- 2005: 2,624
- 2006: 2,581
- 2007: 2,536
- 2008: 2,428
- 2009: 2,723
- 2010: 2,655
- 2011: 2,871
- 2012: 2,838
- 2013: 2,847
- 2014: 2,789
- 2015: 2,872
- 2016: 2,626
