= VestNytt =

Newspaper published in Straume, Norway

Vestnytt (lit. 'West News') is a local newspaper published in Straume, Norway, and covers news from Øygarden Municipality.

== History and profile ==
Vestnytt was established in 1988. The paper is owned by Bergens Tidende. It is a bilingual newspaper and published in both Nynorsk and Bokmål.

It was formerly published three days a week, on Tuesdays, Thursday, and Saturdays, but since 2015 appears twice a week, on Tuesdays and Fridays. Its editorial office is in Straume, the municipal center of Fjell. The paper's first editor was Geir Magnus Nyborg, followed by Øyvind Risnes. The paper is currently edited by Marit Kalgraf, who succeeded Elisabeth Netland after 18 years.

== Circulation ==
According to the Norwegian Audit Bureau of Circulations and National Association of Local Newspapers, Vestnytt has had the following annual circulation:

- 2006: 6,022
- 2007: 6,143
- 2008: 6,176
- 2009: 6,162
- 2010: 6,069
- 2011: 6,053
- 2012: 5,948
- 2013: 5,914
- 2014: 5,718
- 2015: 5,276
- 2016: 4,876
