= Fjell-Ljom =

Norwegian weekly newspaper

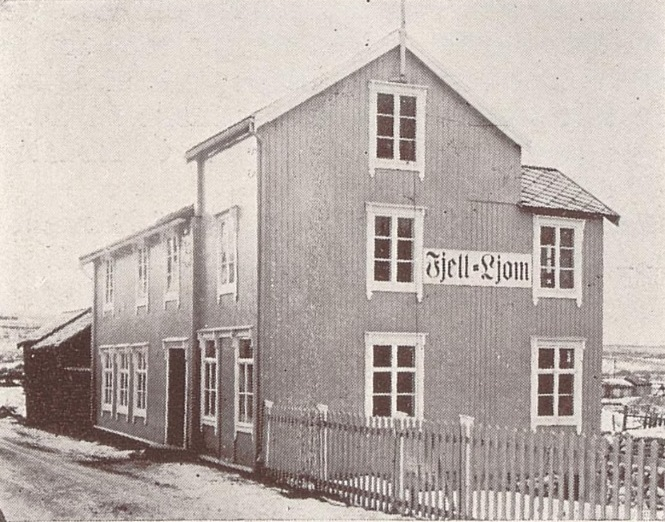
Fjell-Ljom's Editorial Offices, 1927

Fjell-Ljom (transl. The Mountain Echo), originally spelled Fjeld-Ljom, is a local weekly Norwegian newspaper published in Røros in Trøndelag county.

Fjell-Ljom has been published since January 8, 1886. In 1979 the newspaper went into bankruptcy after losing out to its competitor Arbeidets Rett, and it stopped appearing. Thanks to local interests, the newspaper was relaunched in 1993, when it was resumed as a weekly publication. The newspaper was long associated with the Liberal Party, and it was shut down from 1943 to the end of the Second World War.

Fjell-Ljom has been associated with a number of prominent cultural figures throughout its existence, the best-known being the author Johan Falkberget. Fjell-Ljom is published by the company A/S Avisdrift, the largest shareholder of which is Arbeidets Rett. The newspaper's chief editor and general manager is Bjørn Tore Hindklev.

Fjell-Ljom was previously edited and printed in facilities along the Hyttelva, the river running through the center of Røros. The newspaper and its printing press were located there for 88 years, and since 1986 the facility has been the Fjeld-Ljom Newspaper Museum.

== Circulation ==
According to Sigurd Høst (figures for 1947–1995) and the Norwegian Audit Bureau of Circulations and National Association of Local Newspapers (figures after 2004), Fjell-Ljom has had the following annual circulation:

- 1947: 2,392
- 1952: 2,454
- 1960: 2,470
- 1966: 2,121
- 1972: 2,039
- 1978: 1,693
- 1995: 2,087
- 2004: 2,155
- 2005: 2,268
- 2006: 2,474
- 2007: 2,358
- 2008: 2,272
- 2009: 2,326
- 2010: 2,282
- 2011: 2,314
- 2012: 2,263
- 2013: 2,418
- 2014: 2,421
- 2015: 2,460
- 2016: 2,471
