= Andøyposten =

Norwegian regional newspaper

- Type: Regional newspaper
- Owner: Polaris Media
- Publisher: Harstad Tidende Gruppen
- Founded: 1979; 47 years ago
- Language: Norwegian
- Headquarters: Andenes
- Circulation: 1,963 (2013)
- Website: Andøyposten

Andøyposten is a Norwegian language regional newspaper published in Andenes, Norway.

== History and profile ==
Andøyposten was established in 1979. The paper is based in Andenes and is published three times a week. As of 2005 Schibsted owned 28% of the paper. The publisher is the Harstad Tidende Gruppen, a subsidiary of the Polaris Media ASA.

Andøyposten sold 1,734 copies in 2012. The paper had a circulation of 1,963 copies in 2013.

== See also ==
- List of newspapers in Norway
