= Firda Tidend =

Norwegian newspaper

Firda Tidend is a Norwegian newspaper, published in Sandane in Gloppen Municipality, Norway. The newspaper was founded in 1924, and its first editor was Johan Lid. Anders Øvreseth was editor-in-chief for more than thirty years, until his death in 1966. Bjørn Grov was editor from 1979.
