= Lierposten =

Norwegian weekly newspaper

- Type: Weekly newspaper
- Owner: Amedia
- Editor: Pål A. Næss
- Founded: 1987; 39 years ago
- Political alignment: Independent
- Language: Norwegian
- Headquarters: Lier, Buskerud
- Country: Norway
- Circulation: 2,817 (as of 2019)
- Readership: 10,700
- Website: lierposten.no

Lierposten (lit. 'The Lier Post') is a Norwegian weekly newspaper published on Thursdays in Lier in Buskerud county. The newspaper was established in 1987 and is owned by Amedia. It is politically independent. Its editor and manager is Pål A. Næss.

== Circulation ==
According to the Norwegian Media Businesses' Association, Lierposten has had the following annual circulation:

- 2006: 3,315
- 2007: 3,382
- 2008: 3,373
- 2009: 3,340
- 2010: 3,405
- 2011: 3,382
- 2012: 3,368
- 2013: 3,498
- 2014: 3,302
- 2015: 3,134
- 2016: 3,126
- 2017: 3,038
- 2018: 2,932
- 2019: 2,817
