= Fjordabladet =

Norwegian newspaper

- Company type: Private
- Industry: Local newspaper
- Founded: 1873
- Website: www.fjordabladet.com

Logo.

Fjordabladet is a Norwegian newspaper, published two times a week in Nordfjordeid in Vestland county. The newspaper mainly focuses on coverage within Stad Municipality, but does also cover the greater Nordfjord region.

It started on 10 July 1874 as Fjordenes Blad, the Liberal Party organ in the region Nordfjord. A driving force behind the establishment was Otto Blehr, and the first editor-in-chief (until 1882) was Edvard Storm Blom. From 1885 to 1892, when Mons Syltevik was editor, the newspaper leaned more towards the Moderate Liberal Party, but with

the editorship of John Myklebust it then returned to its Liberal allegiance which lasted throughout the party newspaper period.

Fjordabladet is owned by Fjordtrykk, which is in turn owned 32.5% by Sunnmørsposten, 9.9% by competitor Fjordingen, 14.7% by Adfons and 42.9% by small, local owners. The newspaper is issued two days a week, and has a circulation of 2,796, among whom 2,620 are subscribers.
