= Birkenesavisa =

Norwegian newspaper

Birkenesavisa (lit. 'The Birkenes Gazette') is a local Norwegian newspaper in Birkenes Municipality in Agder county. The newspaper was established in 2002 and it is issued 48 times a year. It is published in Birkeland, the administrative center of the municipality. The newspaper appears on Wednesdays and covers Birkeland, Herefoss, and Vegusdal. The chief editor is Geir Willy Haugen.

== Editors ==
- Torbjørn Bjorvatn (2002–2003)
- Bjørn Vidar Lie (2003–2015)
- Geir Willy Haugen (2015–)

== Circulation ==
According to the Norwegian Audit Bureau of Circulations and the National Association of Local Newspapers, Birkenesavisa has had the following annual circulation:

- 2006: 1,416
- 2007: 1,432
- 2008: 1,637
- 2009: 1,495
- 2010: 1,445
- 2011: 1,379
- 2012: 1,344
- 2013: 1,357
- 2014: 1,335
- 2015: 1,259
- 2016: 1,278
