= Lofot-Tidende =

Norwegian newspaper

- Founded: 1952
- Ceased publication: 1958
- Relaunched: 1987
- Language: Norwegian
- Headquarters: Leknes
- Country: Norway
- Website: www.lofot-tidende.no

Lofot-Tidende (The Lofoten Times) is a Norwegian newspaper published in Leknes in Vestvågøy Municipality. It is published once a week, on Wednesdays. Lofot-Tidende covers events in the municipalities of Vestvågøy, Flakstad, and Moskenes in Nordland county and has three employees. The paper's chief editor and general manager is Karin P. Skarby.

An earlier paper called Lofot-Tidende was first published in 1952. It was owned by the Nordahl family in Leknes, but it was sold to the Conservative Party some years later, and it was discontinued in 1958. Today's Lofot-Tidende was launched on November 12, 1987. The paper was owned by Even Carlsen, Kenneth Grav, and Sverre Christoffersen. It was started because it was felt that the newspaper Lofotposten was neglecting Vestvågøy, the largest municipality in Lofoten. The newspaper was sold to A-pressen in 1998 and, after objections from the Norwegian Media Authority that were upheld by the Supreme Court of Norway, it was finally established in 2000 that the newspaper was and is a paper owned by A-pressen, later renamed Amedia.

In November 2014 the company merged Lofot-Tidende and Lofotposten. At the same time, the publication of Lofot-Tidende was cut back from twice to once a week, and the website lofot-tidende.no was shut down. This caused a strong reaction in central and western Lofoten, and local people launched a new paper called Avisa Lofoten. Amedia decided to reverse its decision in 2015, and in September 2015 Lofot-Tidende continued as a separate paper with one issue per week. On October 1, 2015 the website lofot-tidende.no was also reactivated.

Lofot-Tidende was printed at the Lofotposten press in Svolvær until October 1, 2009, when the Svolvær press was shut down. After this, both of the newspapers were printed by K. Nordahls Trykkeri in Sortland, where the newspaper Bladet Vesterålen is also printed. Today the newspaper is printed in Harstad.

== Circulation ==
According to the Norwegian Media Businesses' Association, Lofot-Tidende has had the following annual circulation:

- 2006: 5,045
- 2007: 5,182
- 2008: 4,923
- 2009: 4,649
- 2010: 4,457
- 2011: 4,267
- 2012: 4,207
- 2013: 3,950
- 2014: 3,604
- 2015: 3,067
- 2016: 2,518
