= Bygdebladet Randaberg og Rennesøy =

Norwegian newspaper

- Type: Weekly newspaper
- Owner(s): Amedia (51.0%); Randaberg kommune (34.0%); Stavanger kommune (15.0%)
- Founded: 1997
- Language: Norwegian
- Headquarters: Randaberg Municipality
- Circulation: 3,291 (2017)
- Website: https://bygdebladet.no

Bygdebladet Randaberg og Rennesøy (The Randaberg and Rennesøy Country Gazette) is a local Norwegian newspaper published in Randaberg Municipality in Rogaland county. The newspaper appears once a week and covers events in Randaberg Municipality, Stavanger Municipality, and Kvitsøy Municipality. The newspaper was founded in 1997 and is edited by Kirsti K. Sømme.

== Circulation ==
According to the Norwegian Media Businesses' Association, Bygdebladet Randaberg og Rennesøy has had the following annual circulation:

- 2006: 3,024
- 2007: 3,071
- 2008: 3,231
- 2009: 3,397
- 2010: 3,483
- 2011: 3,564
- 2012: 3,485
- 2013: 3,345
- 2014: 3,456
- 2015: 3,482
- 2016: 3,396
