= Hordaland Folkeblad =

Norwegian newspaper

Hordaland Folkeblad (lit. 'The Hordaland People's Gazette') is a local Norwegian newspaper published in Norheimsund in Vestland county.

The newspaper was established in 1873 and is one of the oldest local newspapers in Norway. It covers news in Kvam Municipality and the Jondal area of western Ullensvang Municipality. Hordaland Folkeblad is published twice a week, on Tuesdays and Fridays, and appears in Nynorsk. Locally, the newspaper is often referred to as Skaaralappen ('Skaar's slip') after Nils Nilsson Skaar (1852–1948), who became the paper's editor in 1878 and its sole owner in 1889. The current editor is Sigbjørn Linga, who assumed the position in 2013.

== Circulation ==
According to the Norwegian Media Businesses' Association, Hordaland Folkeblad has had the following annual circulation:

- 2006: 5,733
- 2007: 5,790
- 2008: 5,799
- 2009: 5,762
- 2010: 5,680
- 2011: 5,620
- 2012: 5,633
- 2013: 5,608
- 2014: 5,520
- 2015: 5,482
- 2016: 5,299
