= Sunnhordland (newspaper) =

Norwegian newspaper

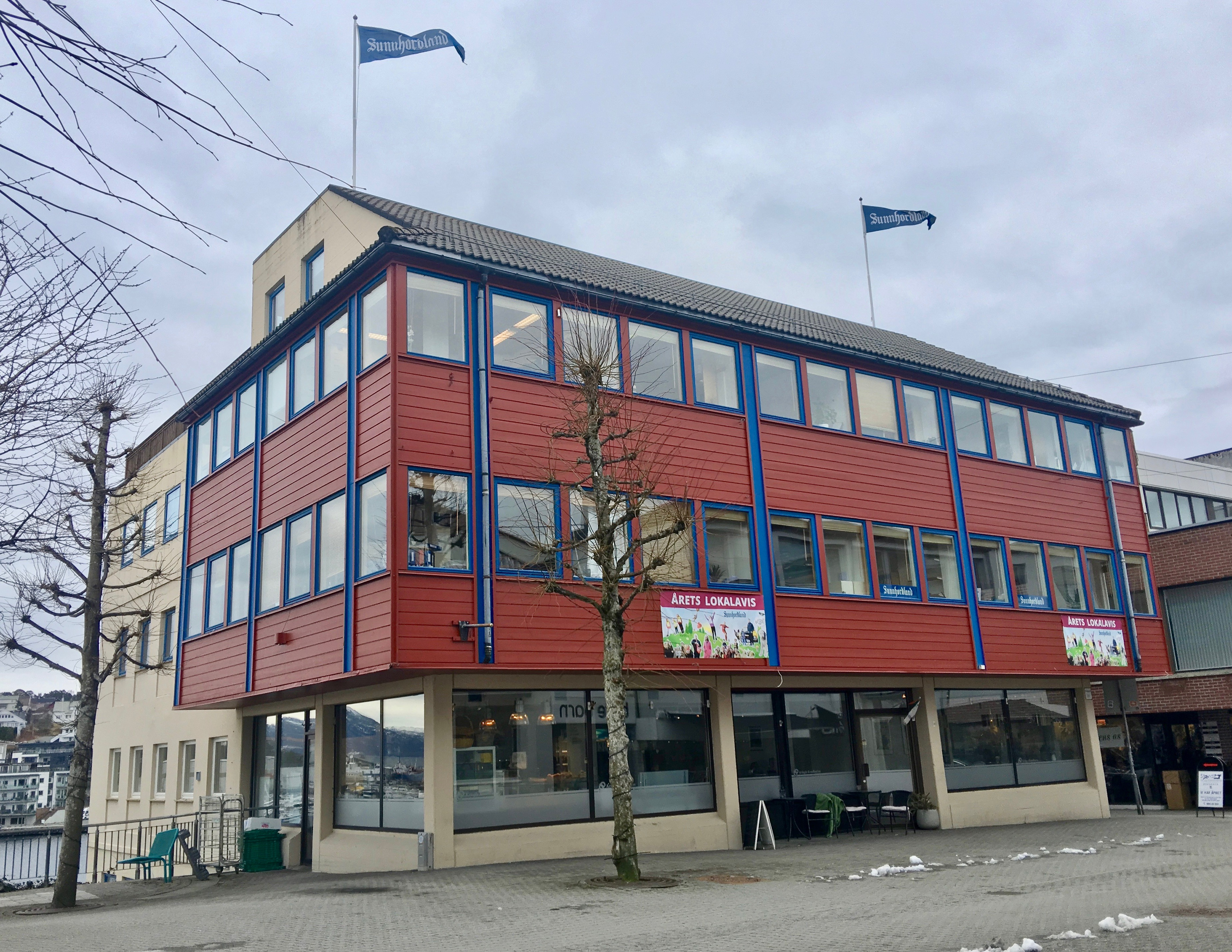
A photo of the Sunnhordland office in Leirvik

Sunnhordland is a local Norwegian newspaper published five times a week in Stord Municipality in Vestland county.

The newspaper was first published on May 1, 1902. The newspaper was started by Jens Hystad and has been owned by his family for its entire duration. Sunnhordland launched its online version as the third most-recent daily newspaper in Norway to do so on April 20, 2006.

The newspaper covers events in the municipalities of Bømlo, Fitjar, Kvinnherad, Stord, and Tysnes. The newspaper's office is located in Leirvik in the municipality of Stord. The paper is edited by Magne Kydland.

== Circulation ==
According to the Norwegian Audit Bureau of Circulations and National Association of Local Newspapers, Sunnhordland has had the following annual circulation:

- 2006: 7,985
- 2007: 7,832
- 2008: 7,832
- 2009: 7,498
- 2010: 7,137
- 2011: 7,036
- 2012: 6,697
- 2013: 6,559
- 2014: 6,571
- 2015: 6,218
- 2016: 6,129
