= Eikerbladet =

Norwegian newspaper

- Owner(s): Amedia (100%)
- Founded: 1992
- Headquarters: Mjøndalen, Norway
- Circulation: 2,345 (2021)
- Website: eikerbladet.no

Eikerbladet (The Eiker Gazette) is a local Norwegian newspaper published in Mjøndalen in Buskerud county.

The newspaper appears on Tuesdays and Fridays, and it covers events in the municipalities of Øvre Eiker and Nedre Eiker. The paper's editor is Knut Bråthen.

== Circulation ==
According to the Norwegian Media Businesses' Association, Eikerbladet has had the following annual circulation:

- 2006: 2,485
- 2007: 2,628
- 2008: 2,676
- 2009: 2,716
- 2010: 2,789
- 2011: 2,792
- 2012: 2,901
- 2013: 3,076
- 2014: 3,179
- 2015: 3,070
- 2016: 3,020
