= Bømlo-nytt =

Norwegian newspaper

Bømlo-nytt (The Bømlo News) is a local Norwegian newspaper published in Svortland in Vestland county. Bømlo-nytt covers events in Bømlo Municipality and is issued every Wednesday and Saturday. The newspaper first appeared on August 30, 1973 and it is published in Nynorsk. The chief editor is Randi Olsen, who succeeded Stein-Erik Ovesen on June 6, 2011.

== Circulation ==
According to the Norwegian Media Businesses' Association, Bømlo-nytt has had the following annual circulation:

- 2006: 3,381
- 2007: 3,398
- 2008: 3,407
- 2009: 3,337
- 2010: 3,301
- 2011: 3,152
- 2012: 3,198
- 2013: 3,294
- 2014: 3,188
- 2015: 3,141
- 2016: 3,205
