= Enebakk Avis =

Norwegian newspaper

- Owner: Amedia (100%)
- Founded: 1999
- Headquarters: Enebakk, Norway
- Circulation: 2,408 (2016)
- Website: enebakkavis.no

Enebakk Avis (The Enebakk Gazette) is a local Norwegian newspaper published in Enebakk in Akershus county.

The company Enebakk Avis AS was launched as its own business by Smaalenene Medier AS. The first issue of the paper was published on December 22, 1999. Enebakk Avis is owned by Amedia. The paper is edited by Gunnleik Seierstad.

== Circulation ==
According to the Norwegian Audit Bureau of Circulations and National Association of Local Newspapers, Enebakk Avis has had the following annual circulation:

- 2000: 1,968
- 2001: 2,405
- 2002: 3,468
- 2003: 2,527
- 2004: 2,749
- 2005: 2,845
- 2006: 2,985
- 2007: 2,984
- 2008: 3,046
- 2009: 2,935
- 2010: 2,939
- 2011: 2,864
- 2012: 2,769
- 2013: 2,671
- 2014: 2,604
- 2015: 2,389
- 2016: 2,408
