= Østhavet =

Norwegian newspaper

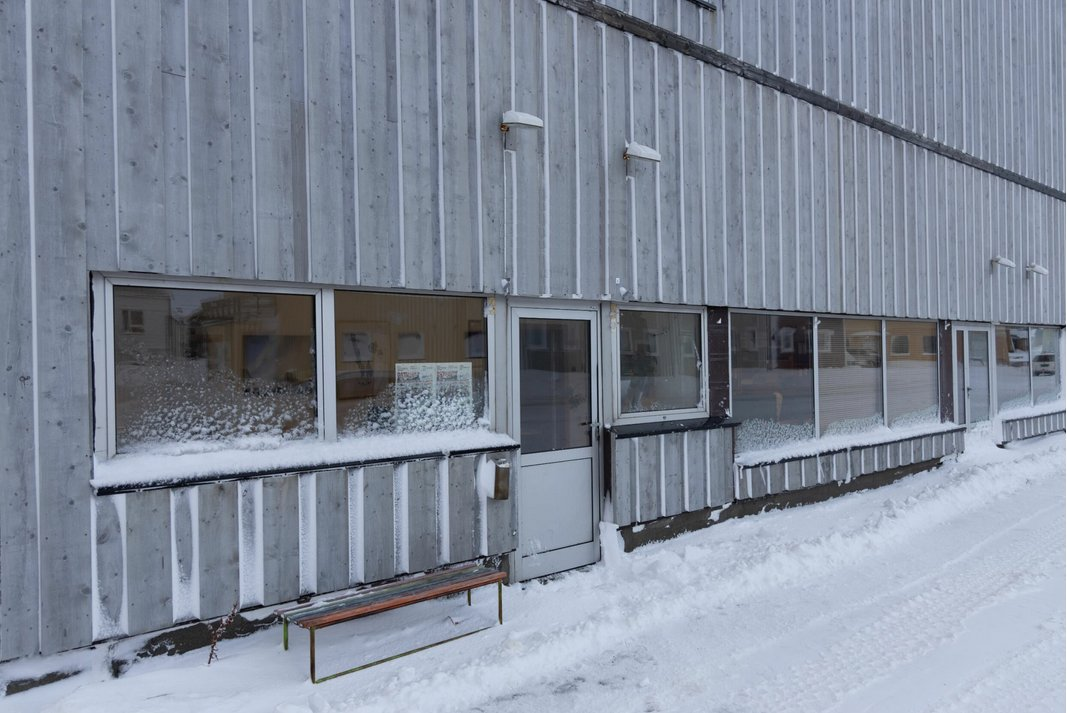

Østhavet (lit. 'the East Sea') is a local Norwegian newspaper published in Vardø Municipality in Finnmark county. The newspaper was established in 1997 and it serves the settlements of Vardø and Kiberg. The newspaper is published every Thursday and usually has 16-20 pages. The chief editor is Jan S. Krogh. The newspaper was named Norway's Local Newspaper of the Year (Årets lokalavis) in 1997.

== Circulation ==
According to the Norwegian Audit Bureau of Circulations and National Association of Local Newspapers, Østhavet has had the following annual circulation:

- 1996: 1,265
- 1997: 1,612
- 1998: 1,496
- 1999: 1,291
- 2000: 1,572
- 2001: 1,381
- 2002: 1,454
- 2003: 1,653
- 2004: 1,731
- 2005: 1,730
- 2006: 1,753
- 2007: 1,776
- 2008: 1,513
- 2009: 1,567
- 2010: 1,664
- 2011: 1,666
- 2012: 1,707
- 2013: 1,664
- 2014: 1,608
- 2015: 1,447
- 2016: 1,401
