= Lillesands-Posten =

Norwegian newspaper

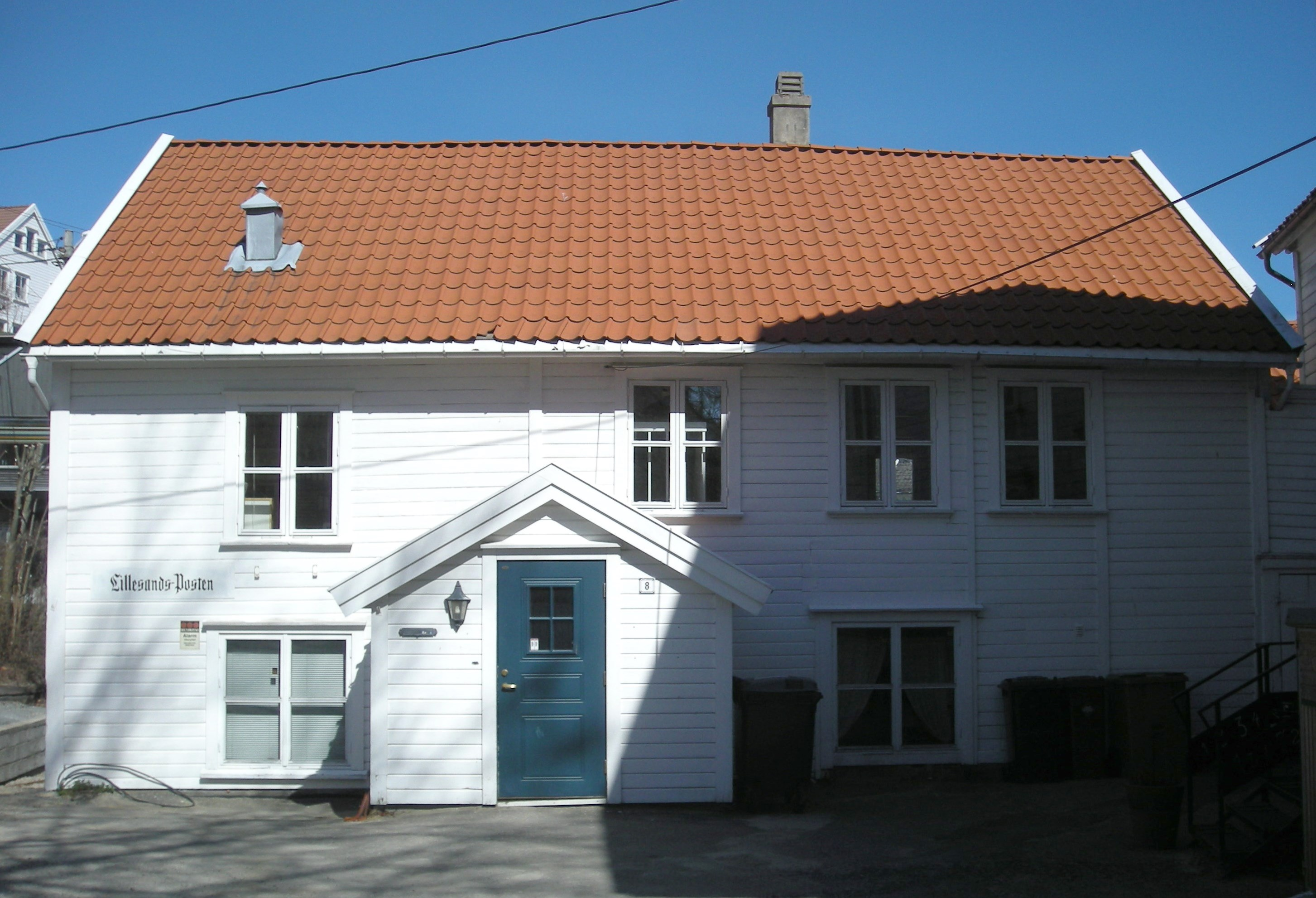
The editorial house in Lillesand

Lillesands-Posten is a local Norwegian newspaper that is published in Lillesand, Norway. The paper covers news from Lillesand Municipality and Birkenes Municipality in Agder county. It has been published since the 1870. The newspaper is owned by Agderposten Medier and is the sister paper of Agderposten. It comes out twice a week, Tuesday and Friday.

The newspapers language is Bokmål, and it is published in Tabloid (newspaper format).

== Circulation ==
Confirmed circulation figures by Mediebedriftenes Landsforening (Newspaper Publishers' Association), Norway:

- 2006: 3,571
- 2007: 3,650
- 2008: 3,792
- 2009: 3,757
- 2010: 3,759
