= Strandbuen =

Norwegian newspaper

- Type: Two days a week
- Owner(s): Jærbladet AS; Dalane Tidende & Egersund Avis AS
- Editor: Ivar Rusdal
- Founded: 1964
- Headquarters: Jørpeland
- Circulation: 4,354
- Website: www.strandbuen.no

Strandbuen is a local newspaper published in Strand Municipality, Norway. It was established in 1964.

It has a circulation of 4,354, of whom 3,895 are subscribers.

Strandbuen is published by Strandbuen AS, which is owned 100% by Jærbladet AS, which is owned 33.3% by Dalane Tidende & Egersund Avis AS and two other agents.
