= Hardanger Folkeblad =

Norwegian newspaper

- Owner: Amedia (100%)
- Founded: 1940; 86 years ago
- Headquarters: Odda, Norway
- Website: hardanger-folkeblad.no

Hardanger Folkeblad is a Norwegian newspaper, published in Odda in Vestland, and covering Ullensvang Municipality and Eidfjord Municipality. The newspaper was founded in 1940, and its first editor was Leif Granli until it was halted by the German occupants in July 1941. After the Second World War there was a merge with Communist controlled Hardanger Arbeiderblad from 1945 to 1949, when the cooperation ended, and Hardanger Folkeblad continued as a separate newspaper. The newspaper is issued three times a week. It had a circulation of 5,499 in 2008.
