= Finnmarken =

Norwegian newspaper

- Owner: A-pressen
- Editor: Karoline Almås Sørensen
- Founded: 1899
- Political alignment: Liberal (1899-1904); Labour (1904- Nazi (1942-1944)
- Circulation: 7,147
- Website: www.finnmarken.no

Finnmarken is a local newspaper published in Vadsø, Norway. It covers eastern Finnmark county. It was established in 1899 by Adam Egede-Nissen and others. From 14 June 2017 to 21 October 2023, the newspaper published issues on Mondays, Wednesdays, Thursdays and Fridays. Since 24 October 2023, the newspaper published issues on Tuesdays and Thursdays.

In 1942, Finnmarken was taken over by the national socialist occupant regime. They incorporated it into Finnmark Folkeblad in 1944. In 1945, after the occupation, this was reversed; however, both Folkets Frihet and Vadsø Arbeiderblad were absorbed into Finnmarken.

It has a circulation of 7,147, of whom 6,302 are subscribers.

Finnmarken (newspaper) is owned by A-pressen Lokale Medier AS, which in turn is owned 100% by A-pressen.

The editor is Karoline Almås Sørensen.
