= Varingen =

Newspaper in Rotnes, Norway

- Owner(s): Various
- Editor: Jan Fossen
- Founded: 1946
- Political alignment: Independent
- Headquarters: Rotnes
- Circulation: 6,020
- Website: www.varingen.no

Varingen is a local newspaper published in Rotnes, Norway. It covers the municipality of Nittedal.

It was established in 1946, and has been independent throughout its existence. It had a circulation of 3,843 in 1983, increasing to the current 6,020, of whom 5,852 are subscribers. It is owned by various local people and groups.
