= Raumnes =

Norwegian newspaper

- Type: Three days a week
- Owner(s): Various
- Editor: Fred Christian Gjestad
- Founded: 1947
- Political alignment: Independent
- Headquarters: Årnes, Norway
- Circulation: 5,247
- Website: www.raumnes.no

Raumnes is a local newspaper published in Årnes, Norway. It covers the municipality of Nes i Akershus.

== History and profile ==
Raumnes was established in 1947, and has been independent throughout its existence. It was originally published twice a week, but this has been increased to three. It had a circulation of 3,222 in 1983, increasing to 5,247 as of 2016. It is owned by various local people and groups.
