= Frostingen =

Newspaper in Frosta, Norway

- Type: Local newspaper
- Format: Tabloid and online
- Founder: Viktor Mostad
- Founded: 1919
- Language: Norwegian
- Headquarters: Frosta Municipality
- Circulation: 1,422 (as of 2013)
- Website: frostingen.no

Frostingen is a local online and weekly print newspaper in published in Frosta Municipality, Norway. Published by Frostingen AS, it covers Frosta as well as the area of Åsen in Levanger Municipality. The newspaper was founded in 1919, remains independently owned and has always been politically neutral.

== History and profile ==
The first attempts at establishing a local newspaper for Frosta were taken by the Agrarian Association in 1909. They were able to collect funds to publish a single issue of Frosta Avis, but were not able to publish any further issues.

Frostingen was established by Viktor Mostad, who was also the inaugural editor. The first issue was published on 3 July 1919. The newspaper struggled financially from the onset. There were sold a fair number of advertisements, even to companies based in Trondheim, but this was not sufficient. The Youth Society therefore took an initiative to establish a limited company to operate the newspaper, and a board to oversee the editor. The board was adamant that the newspaper remain politically neutral, and had several disagreements with Mostad concerning his editorial line, resulting in him being fired in 1920 and replaced by Bjarne Rokseth.

From 1924, Frostingen got its own printing press, and no longer had to be printed in Trondheim. The printing press was situated in the home of Olav Juberg, who worked as typographer. He took over the role as editor from 1934. During the Second World War, the newspaper was forced by the occupational forces to carry propaganda from Nasjonal Samling and the Third Reich. However, lack of paper meant that the newspaper was limited to a single sheet folded in four. Bjarne Juberg took over as editor after his brother in 1943. In 2024, Frostingen entered a strategic cooperation with Amedia to use their technical platforms, but remained locally owned.

== Scope ==
It covers Frosta Municipality and the Åsen area in Levanger Municipality and is published in tabloid format. The newspaper is independently owned. It has one weekly issue, on Thursdays. In 2013 Frostingen had a circulation of 1,422 copies.
