= Sør-Varanger Avis =

Norwegian newspaper

Sør-Varanger Avis is a Norwegian newspaper, published in Kirkenes, Norway. The newspaper covers events in Sør-Varanger Municipality. The newspaper was founded in 1949, and its first editor was Jan W. Krohn Holm. The newspaper is issued three days per week. It had a circulation of 4,036 in 2008.

The chief editor is Kjersti Nævestad (since 2024).

Former chief editors include Frode Nielsen Børfjord (until 2024), and Randi Fløtten Andreassen.
