= Vest-Telemark Blad =

Local newspaper for Vest-Telemark, Norway

Vest-Telemark Blad is a Norwegian newspaper, published in Kviteseid, Norway, and covering the district of Vest-Telemark. The newspaper was founded in 1973, and its first editor was Tore Skaug. The newspaper is issued three days per week. It had a circulation of 5,530 in 2008.
