= Tysvær Bygdeblad =

Norwegian newspaper

Tysvær Bygdeblad is a Norwegian weekly newspaper, published in Aksdal, Norway, and covering Tysvær Municipality. The newspaper was founded in 1975, and its first editor was Lars Olav Tunbø. The newspaper is issued once a week. It had a circulation of 2,180 in 2013. Its editor is Alf Einar Kvalavåg.
