= Fjuken =

Newspaper publication in Skjåk, Norway

- Type: Weekly newspaper
- Publisher: Skjåk Mediautvikling AS
- Founded: 1989
- Headquarters: Skjåk
- Circulation: 4,109 (2006)
- Website: www.fjuken.no

Fjuken is a weekly local newspaper published in Skjåk Municipality, Norway. It serves the municipalities of Skjåk, Lom, and Vågå.

== History and profile ==
Fjuken was founded in 1989. The founders were initially community members. The paper is published by the company Skjåk Mediautvikling AS, which in turn has the following owners:

- Lom og Skjåk Sparebank (21.5%)
- Fjordingen AS (21.3%)
- Polaris Media (18.7%)
- other (38.5%)

The paper had a circulation of 4,109 copies in 2006, of which 3,895 were subscribers.
