= Dalane Tidende =

Local newspaper published in Egersund, Norway

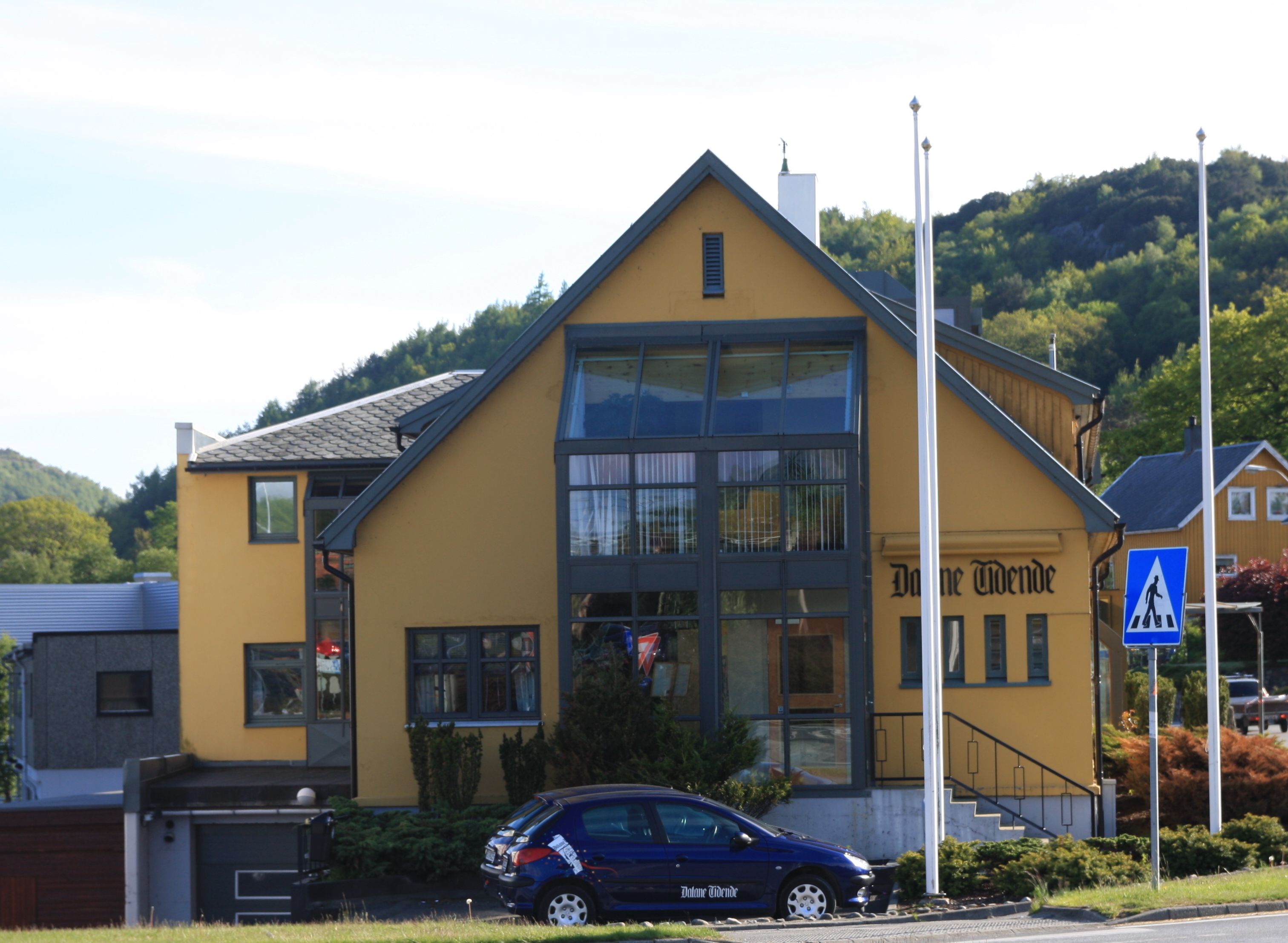
- Type: Daily newspaper
- Owner(s): Dalane Tidende & Egersund Avis AS
- Founded: 1885
- Headquarters: Egersund
- Circulation: 7,385 (2019)
- Website: www.dalane-tidende.no/

Dalane Tidende is a local newspaper published in Egersund, Norway.

== History ==
Dalane Tidende was started in 1885 as Dalernes Tidende. Its name was changed in 1934. It was stopped in 1941, but returned in 1945.

== Present Day ==
It has a circulation of 6775 (2022).

Dalane Tidende is published by Dalane Tidende & Egersund Avis AS, which is owned by half a dozen private persons.
