= Saltenposten =

Norwegian local newspaper

- Type: Local
- Format: Tabloid and online
- Founded: 1996
- Language: Norwegian
- City: Fauske
- Country: Norway
- Circulation: 4,717 (as of 2013)
- Website: saltenposten.no

Saltenposten is a local online and print newspaper published in Fauske, Norway. It covers the municipalities of Fauske, Saltdal, Beiarn and Sørfold in inner Salten. Published in tabloid format, the newspaper had a circulation of 4,717 in 2013. The newspaper is independently owned. It has three weekly issues, on Tuesdays, Thursdays and Saturdays. The newspaper was founded in 1996.
