= Akershus Amtstidende =

Norwegian newspaper

- Type: Daily newspaper
- Owner(s): Amedia (100%)
- Editor: Jan Mattias Mellquist
- Founded: 1874; 151 years ago
- Headquarters: Drøbak
- Website: www.amta.no

Akershus Amtstidende, "Amta", is a local newspaper published in Drøbak, Norway. It covers the western Follo district, with its stronghold in Frogn and Nesodden.

== History and profile ==
It was established in 1874 under the name Follo Tidende, and got its current name in the year 1884.

Akershus Amtstidende is published by the company Akershus Amtstidende AS, which is in turn owned 100% by Amedia. Its editor is Jan Mattias Mellquist. A hundred years later, it had a circulation of 5,655, and had the same editor-in-chief as Akershus Arbeiderblad and Romerikes Blad.
