= Strilen =

Norwegian newspaper

Strilen is a regional newspaper in western Norway. It has between 15,000 and 20,000 readers in the Nordhordland region.

The first edition of Strilen was published on Friday the second of June in 1961. The editor of the 12 first editions of the paper was Mons J. Risa. From 1962 till 1977 Olav L. Hannisdal was the editor of Strilen.

Strilen also has a web-edition today, which is updated approximately three times a week. It contains some of the news found in the paper-edition, but only a small percentage.
