= Nye Troms =

Norwegian newspaper

Nye Troms is a local newspaper published in Målselv Municipality, Norway.
