= Ethical Code of Practice for the Norwegian Press =

The Ethical Code of Practice for the Norwegian Press (Bokmål: Vær Varsom-plakaten, Nynorsk: Ver Varsam-plakaten, Northern Sami: Leage Várrugas) is a code regulating journalism ethics and standards in Norway.

It was first written in 1936. In 1956 it was rewritten for the first time, with important contributions from Verdens Gang editor Christian A. R. Christensen. Later revisions came in 1966, 1975, 1987, 1989, 1990, 1994, 2001, 2005, 2007, 2013 and 2015.

It applies for the written press as well as radio, television and Internet media. Complaints about breaches of the code are handled by Pressens Faglige Utvalg.

The code is supplemented by the 1953 document, the Rights and Duties of the Editor (Redaktørplakaten), as well as a code regarding advertising language (Tekstreklameplakaten).
