= Fanaposten =

Norwegian newspaper covering Fana and Ytrebygda districts in Bergen

- Owner(s): Amedia (100%)
- Founded: 1978
- Headquarters: Nesttun, Norway
- Circulation: 3,254 (2023)
- Website: fanaposten.no

Fanaposten is a Norwegian newspaper, published in Nesttun in Bergen, and covering the districts of Fana and Ytrebygda. The newspaper was founded in 1978, and its first editor was Hans D. Fasmer. The newspaper is issued twice a week. In 2004 Bergens Tidende took over as owner of Fanaposten. Its editor is Ståle Melhus. It had a circulation of 4,683 in 2008.
