= Fjordingen =

Norwegian newspaper

Logo.

Fjordingen is a Norwegian newspaper, published in Stryn in Vestland county. It was named Innfjordingen from 1928 to 1929.

It started on 14 September 1928 as Innfjordingen. The first editor Nils Hertzberg was a sympathizer of the Fatherland League, but the newspaper had no clear political allegiance. It furthermore went bankrupt after a year, but continued from 4 November 1929 with the name Fjordingen.

During the occupation of Norway by Nazi Germany a Nazi editor Bernhard Dippner was forced upon Fjordingen in 1941, before the newspaper was stopped in January 1942. The printing press was also taken away. After the war, the newspaper had some problems getting a new printing press and owner, but it resumed with a trial issue on 18 December 1945, first ordinary issue on 4 January 1946 and ownership by the Conservative Party from 1948. It was bought by local owners in the 1970s, then by Sunnmørsposten in 2003.
