= Bygdanytt =

Norwegian newspaper

Bygdanytt is a Norwegian newspaper, published in Indre Arna in Bergen Municipality, and covering the borough of Arna (in Bergen Municipality) and Osterøy Municipality. The newspaper was founded in 1951, and its first editor was Sigurd Mjeldheim. The newspaper is issued twice a week. It had a circulation of 4,587 in 2008. Its editor is Hallvard Tysse.

In 2012, Bygdanytt was awarded the prize of best local newspaper at European Newspaper Award.
