= Hordaland (newspaper) =

Local newspaper published in Voss, Norway

- Owner: Hordaland Bladdrift
- Editor: Sigmund Midttun
- Founded: 1883; 143 years ago
- Political alignment: Liberal (1884–1972); Non-partisan
- Headquarters: Voss, Norway
- Circulation: 9,600 (2008)
- Website: www.avisa-hordaland.no

Hordaland is a local newspaper published in Voss, Norway. It is published three days a week, and covers news in Ulvik Municipality, Vaksdal Municipality, Voss Municipality, and Modalen Municipality.

== History and profile ==
Established in 1883, Hordaland was affiliated with the Liberal Party of Norway. The party ties were abolished in 1972. The chief editor is Sigmund Midttun.

It had a circulation of 9,600 of whom 8,726 are subscribers in 2008. It is published by Hordaland Bladdrift AS, which is in turn owned by private persons.

The paper was awarded the European Newspaper of the Year in the category of local newspaper by the European Newspapers Congress in 2011.
