= Norwegian Media Businesses' Association =

The Norwegian Media Businesses' Association (Norwegian: Mediebedriftenes Landsforening, MBL) is an employers' organisation in Norway, organized under the national Confederation of Norwegian Enterprise. It is a member of the Norwegian Press Association.
