= Norwegian Audit Bureau of Circulations =

Norwegian monitoring company

The Norwegian Audit Bureau of Circulations (Norwegian: Norsk Opplagskontroll AS) is a company that monitors the print runs of Norwegian newspapers, magazines, and weekly publications, and offers advice on calculating circulation numbers. It was established in 2001 and is owned by:

- The Norwegian Media Businesses' Association (MBL), which represents the country's largest newspapers and a number of magazines and magazines. The organization includes about 128 newspapers and 75 magazines;
- The National Association of Local Newspapers (LLA), which has about 110 small newspapers as members; and
- The Norwegian Media Authority, which manages about NOK 300 million in press subsidies.

The three partners each have a one-third stake in the company and act as the contracting authority for the company. The three owners also prepare the regulations used to carry out the monitoring.

In practice, the publications submit circulation figures through their organizations. The Norwegian Audit Bureau of Circulations usually provides advance recognition based on the figures, and then performs local checks on a portion of the member papers. The approved net circulation figures are of major economic importance to the various publications: they are the decisive factor for income from the advertising market, and are the basis for receiving press subsidies.

The Norwegian Audit Bureau of Circulations has an office in Porsgrunn and it has been headed by Henry Nilsen since 2010. The company is an affiliate member of the International Federation of Audit Bureaux of Circulations.
