= Butler-Henderson =

Butler-Henderson may refer to:

- Charlie Butler-Henderson (born 1978), British motor racing driver
- Capt. The Hon. Eric Butler-Henderson (1884–1953), British soldier and company director
  - GCR Class 11F locomotive no. 506, named Butler–Henderson after the above
- Vicki Butler-Henderson (born 1972), British racing driver and television presenter

== See also ==
- Butler (surname)
- Henderson (surname)
