= Saunders Mucklebackit =

Fictional character by Walter Scott

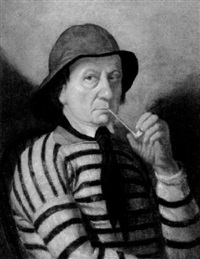
- Saunders Mucklebackit, the Old Fisherman (1853) by Henry Stacy Marks
- First appearance: The Antiquary (1816)
- Created by: Walter Scott

In-universe information
- Gender: Male
- Occupation: Fisherman
- Spouse: Maggie Mucklebackit
- Relatives: Reginald Cheyne (Grandfather); Elspeth Mucklebackit (née Cheyne) (Mother); Simon Mucklebackit (Father); Steenie Mucklebackit (Son); Jenny Mucklebackit (Daughter); Patie Mucklebackit (Son)
- Religion: Presbyterian
- Nationality: Scottish

Saunders Mucklebackit is a character in Walter Scott's 1816 novel The Antiquary, an elderly fisherman and smuggler who is bereaved of his son. Though a comparatively minor character he has often been singled out for praise as one of the novel's most masterly creations.

== His role in the novel ==
Mucklebackit first appears in the novel as one of the rescuers of Sir Arthur Wardour and his companions when they are stranded on a cliff-face and in danger of drowning. His impatience of the title-character Jonathan Oldbuck's interference is also seen for the first time. Much later Mucklebackit's son Steenie is drowned, and at the lad's funeral Saunders is almost incoherent with grief. Since he is too overcome to help to carry the coffin to the graveyard Oldbuck takes his place. While the interment is taking place the Mucklebackit cottage is visited by Lord Glenallan, who, unaware of the funeral, wishes to speak with Saunders' mother Elspeth. Saunders indignantly refuses him entrance, but is over-ruled by his mother. Oldbuck returns to find Mucklebackit repairing the fishing-boat from which Steenie had been swept, and says how pleased he is to find him capable of that job. Mucklebackit replies,

"And what would you have me to do…unless I wanted to see four children starve, because ane is drowned? It's weel wi' you gentles, that can sit in the house wi' handkerchers at your een when ye lose a friend; but the like o' us maun to our wark again, if our hearts were beating as hard as my hammer."

Finding the job too much for him he flings his hammer aside, and Oldbuck offers to send a professional carpenter to repair the boat. Mucklebackit thanks him for this and for the honour he did him in helping to carry the body, and the two men break into tears.

== Critical assessment ==
Several contemporary reviews of The Antiquary quoted the scene of the Mucklebackit funeral as a highlight of the novel. The Monthly Review found the scene strongly drawn with a terrible effectiveness, Francis Jeffrey in the Edinburgh Review found it "in the highest degree striking and pathetic", and the British Critic commented on how cold, forced and heartless various of Byron's poems seemed by comparison. Byron himself and Scott's son-in-law and biographer J. G. Lockhart were both struck by the power of the scene in which Mucklebackit is found repairing his boat despite his son's death.

Moving forward to the 20th century, Andrew Lang found the character of Mucklebackit to be an example of Scott's art at its very best. Virginia Woolf presented the same opinion through her character Mr. Ramsay in To the Lighthouse, and in her own voice said that in the funeral scene the various elements "come together…drawn, one knows not how, to make a whole, a complete presentation of life". The boat-repairing speech put Catherine Macdonald Maclean in mind of David's lament for Absalom in the Second Book of Samuel. John Buchan wrote that Mucklebackit and Edie Ochiltree were the true heroes of The Antiquary, and that through strong emotion the fisherman rose to an epic dignity with the austere quality of the sagas. Scott's biographer Edgar Johnson praised the "racy and picturesque Scots" of Mucklebackit's dialogue, and found his rhetoric "beautiful and effective", but wondered whether its poetry and eloquence were true to life. David D. Brown thought the interchange between Mucklebackit and Oldbuck the most poignant in all Scott's work, Mucklebackit being Scott's "only spokesman for the incipient working classes". Likewise Harry E. Shaw found the boat-repairing scene unforgettable, and saw Mucklebackit as the voice of social protest by the Scottish peasant class against the gentry. Jane Millgate considered the tragedy of Mucklebackit's bereavement an essential strand of the novel's plot, in that it shows us the empathetic and humane side of Oldbuck's character and prepares both Oldbuck and the reader for his generous response to Lord Glenallan's plea for help in recovering his lost son. The scholar Robin Mayhead, noting that Mucklebackit is, with Edie Ochiltree, the character furthest from sham and pretension, was reminded of the stoical Scott who endured the troubled years that followed the death of his wife Charlotte.
