= GCR Class 11F =

Type of steam locomotive

GCR Class 11F LNER Class D11
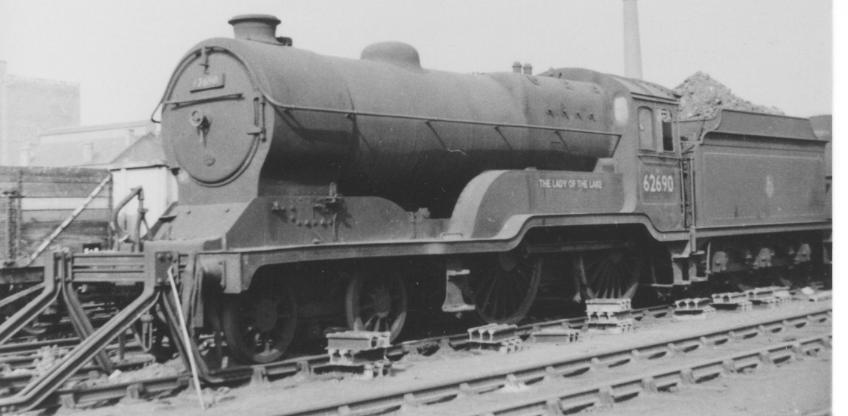
- GCR Class 11F 62690 (LNER D11/2 No. 6397) The Lady of the Lake at Haymarket MPD, Edinburgh, in 1958
Type and origin
- Power type: Steam
- Designer: John G. Robinson
- Builder: GCR Gorton Works (11); Kitson & Co. (12); Armstrong Whitworth (12)
- Build date: 1919–1924
- Total produced: 35
Specifications
- Configuration
  - Whyte: 4-4-0
  - UIC: 2′B h2
- Gauge: 4 ft 8 1/2 in (1,435 mm) standard gauge
- Leading dia.: 3 ft 6 in (1.067 m)
- Driver dia.: 6 ft 9 in (2.057 m)
- Length: 56 ft 5.5 in (17.209 m)
- Loco weight: 61.15 long tons (62.13 t; 68.49 short tons)
- Tender weight: 48.30 long tons (49.08 t; 54.10 short tons)
- Fuel type: Coal
- Fuel capacity: 6 long tons 0 cwt (13,400 lb or 6.1 t)
- Water cap.: 4,000 imp gal (18,000 L; 4,800 US gal)
- Firebox
  - Grate area: 26.5 sq ft (2.46 m^{2})
- Boiler
  - Diameter: 5 ft 0.5 in (1,537 mm) to 5 ft 3 in (1,600 mm)
- Boiler pressure: 180 psi (1.24 MPa)
- Heating surface
  - Firebox: 155 sq ft (14.4 m^{2})
  - Tubes: 972 sq ft (90.3 m^{2})
  - Flues: 416 sq ft (38.6 m^{2})
  - Total surface: 1,543 sq ft (143.3 m^{2})
- Superheater
  - Heating area: 209 sq ft (19.4 m^{2})
- Cylinders: Two, inside
- Cylinder size: 20 in × 26 in (508 mm × 660 mm)
- Valve gear: Stephenson
- Valve type: 10 inches (254 mm) piston valves
Performance figures
- Tractive effort: 19,645 lbf (87.4 kN)
Career
- Operators: Great Central Railway; → London and North Eastern Railway; → British Railways
- Class: GCR: 11F; LNER: D11/1, D11/2
- Power class: BR: 3P2F
- Withdrawn: 1958–1962
- Disposition: One preserved, remainder scrapped

The Great Central Railway Class 11F or Improved Director Class is a class of 4-4-0 steam locomotive designed by John G. Robinson for passenger work. The LNER classified them as Class D11 in 1923. They were based on the earlier GCR Class 11E "Director" class (LNER D10).

There were two subclasses: D11/1 were the original GCR engines and D11/2 were those built in 1924 by the LNER to a reduced loading gauge with smaller boiler mountings for hauling passenger trains in Scotland.

== Operational career ==
The 11F Class was initially used on passenger work on the GCR system, including fast expresses from Sheffield Victoria to London Marylebone. Later in their careers, they were used on short-distance passenger trains. On lines of the Cheshire Lines Committee during the late 1940s and early 1950s, they hauled expresses between Manchester Central and Liverpool Central; also semi-fast trains from Manchester Central via Northwich to Chester Northgate.

Their 6 ft 9 inches driving wheels made them fast locos, but consequently unsuitable for hauling freight trains. The eleven original 11F locos were withdrawn during 1959 and 1960 as diesel multiple units took over operation of the shorter distance passenger trains. The final Scottish D11/2 was withdrawn in January 1962.

== Preservation ==
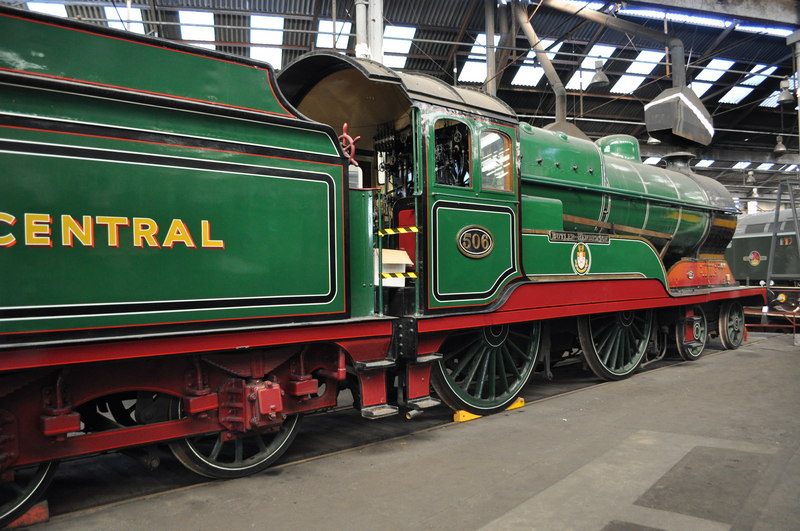
Barrow Hill in March 2011

The sixth member of the class, No. 506 Butler-Henderson, was withdrawn from use by British Railways during 1960. It has been preserved as part of the UK National Collection and currently wears restored GCR colours. No. 506 is the only surviving GCR passenger locomotive.

The locomotive operated passenger trains on the preserved Great Central Railway in Leicestershire during the late 1970s, 1980s and early 1990s but is now out of running order. The locomotive was placed on long-term loan for static display at Barrow Hill Engine Shed, near Chesterfield, in 2005, where she currently resides.

== Stock list ==
GCR/LNER stock list
GCR No.	Name	Date built	LNER No.	1946 LNER No.	BR No.	Date withdrawn	Notes
501	Mons	September 1922	5501	2665	62665	May 1959	
502	Zeebrugge	October 1922	5502	2666	62666	December 1960	
503	Somme	November 1922	5503	2667	62667	August 1960	
504	Jutland	November 1922	5504	2668	62668	November 1960	
505	Ypres	December 1922	5505	2669	62669	August 1960	
506	Butler-Henderson	December 1919	5506	2660	62660	November 1960	Preserved
507	Gerard Powys Dewhurst	February 1920	5507	2661	62661	November 1960	
508	Prince of Wales	March 1920	5508	2662	62662	August 1960	
509	Prince Albert	March 1920	5509	2663	62663	May 1960	
510	Princess Mary	May 1920	5510	2664	62664	August 1960	
511	Marne	December 1922	5511	2670	62670	November 1960	
1378	Bailie MacWheeble	July 1924	6378	2671	62671	May 1961	
1379	Baron of Bradwardine	August 1924	6379	2672	62672	September 1961	
1380	Evan Dhu	August 1924	6380	2673	62673	July 1959	
1381	Flora MacIvor	August 1924	6381	2674	62674	July 1961	
1382	Colonel Gardiner	August 1924	6382	2675	62675	October 1959	
1383	Jonathan Oldbuck	August 1924	6383	2676	62676	October 1959	
1384	Edie Ochiltree	September 1924	6384	2677	62677	August 1959	
1385	Luckie Mucklebackit	September 1924	6385	2678	62678	March 1959	
1386	Lord Glenallan	October 1924	6386	2679	62679	September 1958	First one to be withdrawn
1387	Lucy Ashton	October 1924	6387	2680	62680	September 1961	
1388	Captain Craigengelt	October 1924	6388	2681	62681	July 1961	
1389	Haystoun of Bucklaw	October 1924	6389	2682	62682	September 1961	
1390	Hobbie Elliott	October 1924	6390	2683	62683	September 1958	
1391	Wizard of the Moor	October 1924	6391	2684	62684	October 1959	
1392	Malcolm Graeme	October 1924	6392	2685	62685	January 1962	Last one to be withdrawn
1393	The Fiery Cross	October 1924	6393	2686	62686	July 1961	
1394	Lord James of Douglas	October 1924	6394	2687	62687	August 1961	
1395	Ellen Douglas	November 1924	6395	2688	62688	July 1961	
1396	Maid of Lorn	November 1924	6396	2689	62689	July 1961	
1397	The Lady of the Lake	November 1924	6397	2690	62690	July 1961	
1398	Laird of Balmawhapple	November 1924	6398	2691	62691	November 1961	
1399	Allan-Bane	November 1924	6399	2692	62692	November 1959	
1400	Roderick Dhu	November 1924	6400	2693	62693	November 1961	
1401	James Fitzjames	November 1924	6401	2694	62694	November 1959	

== Models ==
In 2012, Bachmann Branchline introduced models of the D11 in other Great Central liveries, LNER liveries and British Railway liveries. In 2012, Bachmann produced an exclusive OO gauge model of No. 506 Butler-Henderson for the National Railway Museum shop, as a hundred-piece limited edition in Great Central livery. Bachmann's general production run of the model totalled 1,500.
