= Glommen (newspaper) =

Norwegian newspaper

Glommen was a Norwegian newspaper published in Sarpsborg in Østfold county.

== History and profile ==
Glommen was started on 19 September 1888. It was published by Tollef Ellefssøn, and edited anonymously by Oluf Falck-Ytter. The newspaper was started as a competitor to the city's dominant, conservative newspaper Sarpen, and became even more outspokenly liberal with time. It had a sound economy and circulation, and it even helped other liberal newspapers in the county, such as Halden which it helped press from 1931.

The German occupation of Norway changed the situation. The last edition of Glommen came on 1 October 1941, and then it was stopped as a part of the Germans' press policies. It never returned.
