= Audun Munthe-Kaas Hierman =

Norwegian newspaper editor and novelist

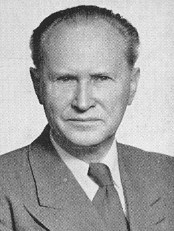
Audun Munthe-Kaas Hierman

Audun Munthe-Kaas Hierman (8 September 1892 – 27 February 1975) was a Norwegian newspaper editor and novelist.

He was born in Kinn Municipality. He was the editor-in-chief of Smaalenenes Amtstidende from 1919 to 1931, then Sarpen, Larvik Morgenavis and finally Tønsbergs Blad from 1950 to 1954. He published several novels; some for a juvenile audience under the pseudonym Peder Flint.
