= Tú alfagra land mítt =

National anthem of the Faroe Islands

English: Thou fairest land of mine
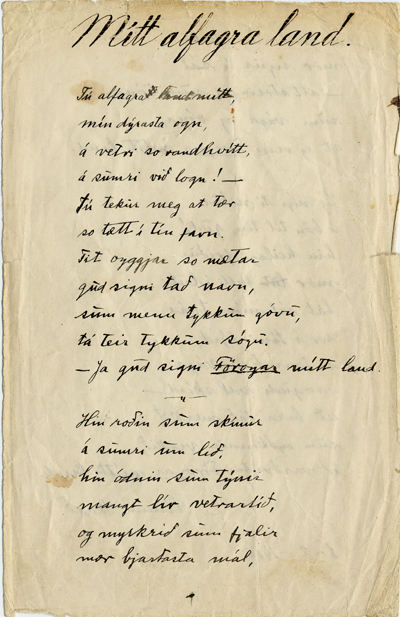
- Original manuscript of 1906
- National anthem of Faroe Islands
- Also known as: Mítt alfagra land (English: My fairest land)
- Lyrics: Símun av Skarði, 1 February 1906
- Music: Petur Alberg, 1907
- Adopted: 1948

Audio sample
- Instrumental version: file; help

"Tú alfagra land mítt" ("Thou fairest land of mine"), officially "Mítt alfagra land" ("My fairest land"), is the national anthem of the Faroe Islands. It was written in 1906 by headteacher Símun av Skarði, and the melody was composed in 1907 by violinist Petur Alberg.

== History ==
=== Composition ===
The song was written in a work dated 1 February 1906 by Símun av Skarði, the headmaster of a high school in Føgrulið, southwest of Klaksvík. It was written during a time of strong division in the Faroe Islands between conservatives who wanted to preserve Danish rule and autonomists who wanted more self-government, of which Símun was the latter.

Violinist Petur Alberg wrote the first notes of the music of the anthem on 4 September 1907, after the melody came to him that evening. He later sang the melody down the phone in the Løgting to Símun av Skarði, who liked it. Petur then sent it to a music teacher he knew in Akureyri, Iceland, and to asked him to harmonise it for a male quartet. In October 1907, the male quartet arrangement arrived, and singers began to practice it for a Boxing Day concert in Sloan's Hall in Tórshavn. Petur, not daring to reveal the song's author, told the singers the song was Icelandic, by a certain Jón Sveinsson. However, the singers liked the song. The song was performed at the concert on 26 December 1907, which was the first time any song by Petur had been performed publicly and the first time "Tú alfagra land mítt" was performed publicly.

=== Distribution ===
On 8 January 1908, "Tú alfagra land mítt" was published in the Faroese newspaper Tingakrossur. It was then published in the Lesibók, a literary history in chronological order, in 1911. It was later published in many editions of the Songbók Føroya fólks (Faroese People's Songbook), generally in the number one position, from 1913 through 1959.

In 1925, a Nynorsk translation of the song by Rolf Hjort Schøgen was published in the Tingakrossur. In 1928, a Danish translation by university student Tormod Jørgensen was published in Højskolebladet No. 7928. An Icelandic translation by Jochum M. Eggertsson appeared in the magazine Dvöl in 1935. The same year, a German translation by Ernst Krenn was published in the Føroyaheftið ("Faroese Instalment"), a Faroese booklet at the Nordic Society in Vienna, Austria. In 1943, an English translation by Padre G. C. C. Knowleson was featured in the notes of the magazine The Pioneer by some British soldiers in the Faroe Islands during World War II.

=== As the national anthem ===
"Tú alfagra land mítt" won out in a rivalry with "Eg oyggjar veit" ("I know some islands"), from 1877, on which song should become the national anthem of the Faroe Islands. "Tú alfagra land mítt" has been sung at all festivals in the Faroe Islands, and it has been in the psalm book of the Faroese Church since 1990. The national radio station Útvarp Føroya, established in 1957, played it every night before ending its broadcast for the evening.

== Lyrics ==
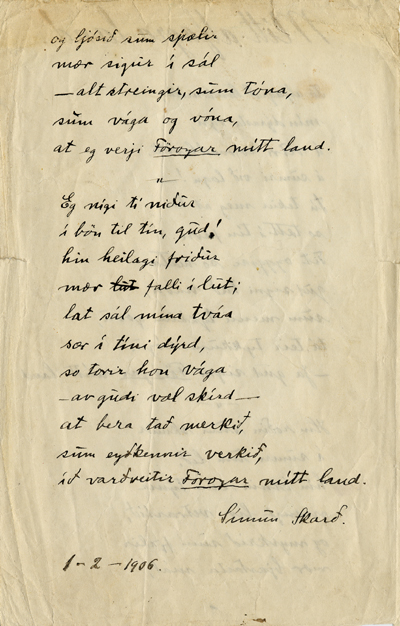
Second page of the original manuscript

Faroese original

I
Tú alfagra land mítt, mín dýrasta ogn!
á vetri so randhvítt, á sumri við logn,
tú tekur meg at tær so tætt í tín favn.
Tit oyggjar so mætar, Guð signi tað navn,
sum menn tykkum góvu, tá teir tykkum sóu.
Ja, Guð signi Føroyar, mítt land!

II
Hin roðin, sum skínur á sumri í líð,
hin ódnin, sum týnir mangt lív vetrartíð,
og myrkrið, sum fjalir mær bjartasta mál,
og ljósið, sum spælir mær sigur í sál:
alt streingir, ið tóna, sum vága og vóna,
at eg verji Føroyar, mítt land.

III
Eg nígi tí niður í bøn til tín, Guð:
Hin heilagi friður mær falli í lut!
Lat sál mína tváa sær í tíni dýrd!
So torir hon vága - av Gudi væl skírd -
at bera tað merkið, sum eyðkennir verkið,
ið varðveitir Føroyar, mítt land!

IPA transcription (Note: See Help:IPA and Faroese phonology.)

1
[tʉu̯ː ˈal̥.fa.g̊ra̯ː lant mʊi̯t mʊi̯n tʊi̯ː.ɹas.ta ɔg̊n]
[ɔaː ˈveː.tɹɪ soː ˈɹan(t).kvʊi̯t (ɔ̯)aː ˈsʊm.ɹɪ viː lɔkn]
[tʰʉu̯ː ˈtʰeː.kʊɹ meː ɛa̯ːʰt tʰɛa̯ːɹ soː tʰatː(ʰ) ʊi̯ː tʰʊi̯ːjn fau̯n]
[tʰiːt ˈɔd.d͡ʒaɹ soː ˈmɛa̯ːʰ.taɹ kuː(t) ˈsɪk.nɪ tʰɛa̯ nau̯n]
[sʊmː mɛnː ˈtʰɪʰ.kun ˈɡɔu̯.ʋʊ tʰɔɑ̯ː tʰai̯ːɹ ˈtʰɪʰ.kun ˈsɔu̯.wʊ]
[jɛa̯ː kuː(t) ˈsɪk.nɪ ˈfœɹ.jaɹ mʊi̯t lant]

2
[hiːn ˈɹoː.jɪn suːmː ˈskʊi̯.nʊɹ (ɔ̯)aː ˈsʊm.ɹɪ ʊi̯ː lʊi̯ː]
[hiːn ˈœt.nɪn sʊmː ˈtʰʊi̯.nɪɹ mɛŋ(k)t lʊi̯ːv ˈveː.tɹaɹ.tʰʊi̯ːj]
[o(ɔ̯)ː ˈmɪʂ.kɹɪ sʊmː ˈfjaː.lɪɹ mɛa̯ːɹ ˈbjaʂ.tas.ta mɔɑ̯ːl]
[o(ɔ̯)ː ˈljɔu̯ː.sɪ sʊmː ˈspɛa̯ː.lɪɹ mɛa̯ːɹ ˈsiː.jʊɹ ʊi̯ː sɔɑ̯ːl]
[al̥t ˈstɹaɲ.d͡ʒɪɹ ʊi̯ːj ˈtʰɔu̯.na sʊmː vɔː.(w)a oː vɔu̯ː.na]
[ɛa̯ːʰt eː ˈvɛɹ.jɪ ˈfœɹ.jaɹ mʊi̯t lant]

3
[eː ˈnʊi̯ː.jɪ tʰʊi̯ː ˈniː.jʊɹ ʊi̯ː bøːn tʰiːl tʰʊi̯ːjn kuː(t)]
[hiːn ˈhai̯ː.la.jɪ ˈfɹiː.jʊɹ mɛa̯ːɹ fat.lɪ ʊi̯ː luː(t)]
[lɛa̯ːt sɔɑ̯ːl ˈmʊi̯.na tʰvɔː.(w)a sɛa̯ɹ ʊi̯ː tʰʊi̯.nɪ tʊɹt]
[soː ˈtʰoː.ɹɪɹ hoːn vɔː.(w)a ɛa̯ːʋ kuː.tɪ vɛa̯ːl skʊɹt]
[ɛa̯ːʰt ˈpeː.ɹa tʰɛa̯ ˈmɛʂ.t͡ʃɪ sʊmː ˈɛ(j)ʰ.tʃɛn.nɪɹ vɛʂ.t͡ʃɪ]
[ʊi̯ːj ˈvaɹ.vai̯.tɪɹ ˈfœɹ.jaɹ mʊi̯t lant]

Literal English translation

I
You fairest land of mine, my dearest own!
in winter so edge-white, in summer with calm,
you take me to you so tight in your embrace.
You islands so valuable, God bless the name
that men gave to you when they saw you.
Yes, God bless the Faroes, my land!

II
The red that you shine in summer on hillside,
the tempest that destroys many lives wintertime,
and the darkness that hides from me the brightest goal,
and the light that plays me victory in the soul:
all strings that sound, that dare and hope
that I defend the Faroes, my land!

III
I bow therefore down in prayer to you, God:
The holy peace, that I fall to fate!
Let my soul be washed itself in your glory!
So may it be dared – well cleansed by God –
to bear the flag that distinguishes the work
that preserves the Faroes, my land!

Metered Danish translation
(by Tormod Jørgensen, 1928)

I
O, Færø så fager, min dyreste skat!
Når vinterstorm brager, i lun sommernat
du drager derude mig hjem i din favn.
I øer så prude, Gud signe det navn,
som fædrene gav jer, da de fandt bag hav jer.
Ja, Gud signe Færø, mit land.

II
Hin solglans, som svæver om sommergrøn lid,
og stormen, som kræver mangt liv vintertid,
og mørket, som dølger mig fjeldryg og tind,
og lyset, som bølger og hvisker i sind:
Alt strenge, som klinger og lønligt mig tvinger
at værge dig, Færø, mit land.

III
Mit knæ vil jeg bøje i bøn til dig, Gud:
Din fred, o du høje, lad bringe mig bud!
Min sjæl vil sig sænke i dit nådebad,
så tør den vel tænke – frimodig og glad –.
at frembære mærket, som vidner om værket,
der tjerner dig, Færø, mit land!

Metered English translation

I
My land, oh most beauteous, possession most dear,
Thou drawest me to thee, embracing me near;
becalmed in the summer, in winter snow covered,
magnificent islands, by God named beloved.
The name which men gave thee when they thee discovered,
Oh, God bless thee, Faroes my land.

II
Bright gleam, which in summer makes hill-tops so fair;
rough gale, which in winter drives men to despair;
oh life taking storm, oh conquest of soul,
all making sweet music uniting the whole.
Each hoping and trusting, inspiring us all,
To guard thee, O Faroes my land.

III
And therefore, I kneel down, to Thee God, in prayer,
may peaceful my lot be, and do thou me spare,
my soul cleansed; in glory; I ask Thee to bless,
when I raise my banner and venture the stress.
The sign of my task, be it lifted on high,
To guard thee, O Faroes my land.

== Literature ==
- W.B. Lockwood: An Introduction to Modern Faroese, Tórshavn 1977
