= Idd og Marker =

Norwegian newspaper

Idd og Marker was a Norwegian newspaper, published in Halden in Østfold county.

It was started on 1 September 1936, and named after the rural municipalities Idd and Marker outside of Halden. It was an organ for the Norwegian Agrarian Association, started by Agrarian Party politician Birger Braadland. The first and only editor was Christian Aalborg, who also edited Rakkestad Avis. Idd og Marker competed with both Smaalenenes Amtstidende, Halden and Halden Arbeiderblad.

During the German occupation of Norway, Halden Arbeiderblad was stopped by the Germans, and Idd og Marker tried to adapt to a Nazi rule. It did not help, and after its last issue on 28 February 1942, Idd og Marker was amalgamated into Smaalenenes Amtstidende because of "rationalization". It never returned.
