= Bidding stick =

Wooden object carried by a messenger to rally people

A bidding stick (sometimes also referred to as a budstikke, war arrow, or stembod) is a term for a wooden object, such as a club or baton, carried by a messenger and used by Northern Europeans, for example in Scotland and Scandinavia, to rally people for things (assemblies) and for defence or rebellion.

== Scotland ==
In Scotland, such a token (Scottish Gaelic: crann-tara, translated as "fiery cross" or "cross of shame") was used to rally clan members to arms. The practice is described in the novels and poetry of Sir Walter Scott. A small burning cross or charred piece of wood would be carried from town to town. A widely known use was in the 1715 Jacobite rising, although it was used more recently among Scottish settlers in Canada during the War of 1812. In 1820, over 800 fighting men of the Scottish Clan Grant were gathered, by the passing of the Fiery Cross, to come to the aid of their Clan Chief and his sister in the town of Elgin.

The name Crann Tara was used for a Scottish Gaelic current affairs programme on Grampian Television (ITV) and a political magazine edited by Norman Easton between 1977 and 1982.

== Scandinavia ==
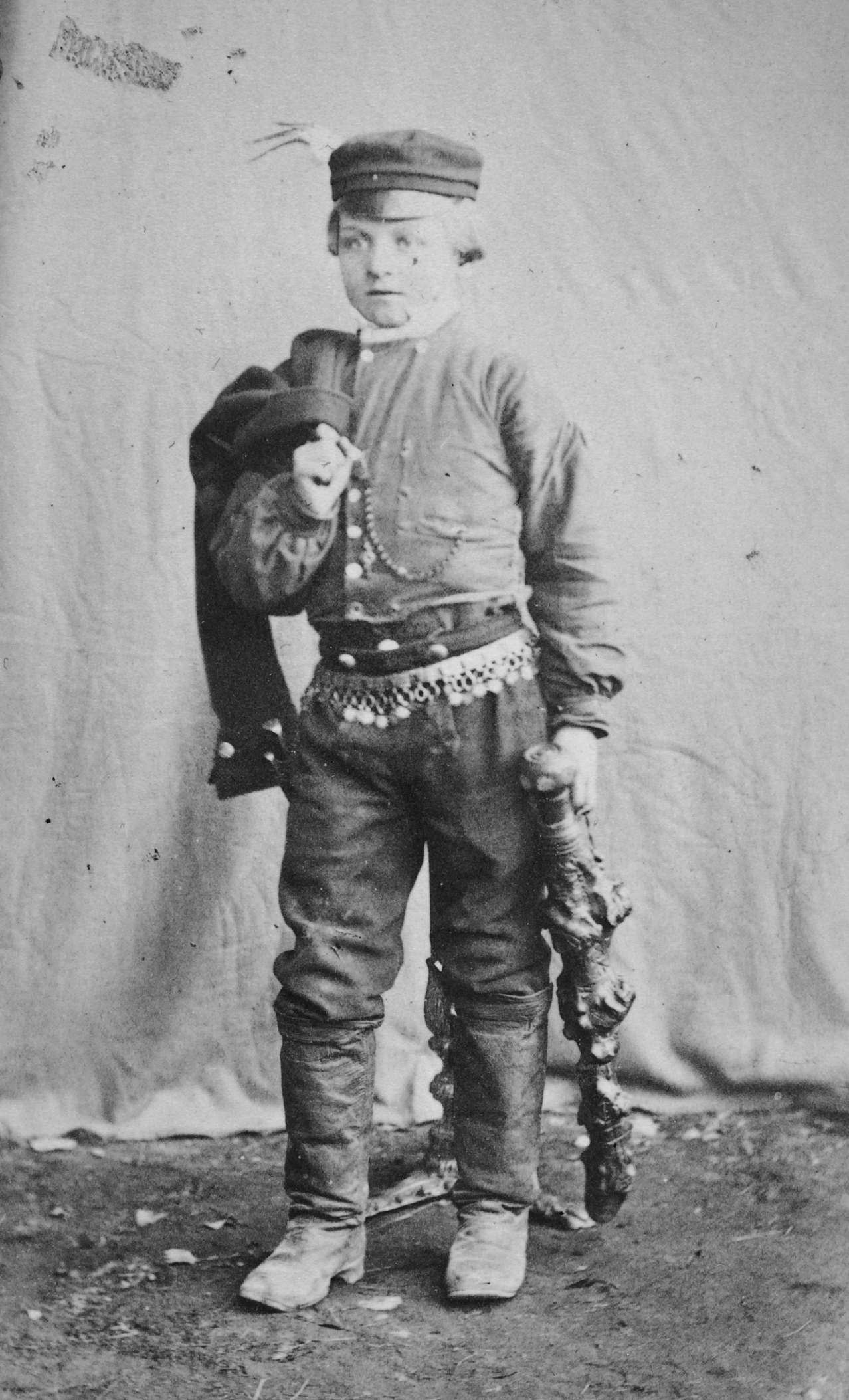
A Finnish boy with a bidding stick from 1876

When an enemy had arrived, bidding sticks (Old Swedish: buþkafle (sg.)) were sent in all directions. In Sweden, they consisted of clubs, or just wooden chunks; in Norway, there were repurposed arrows. Sometimes the bidding sticks had a string attached to one end and were charred on the other end; Olaus Magnus (1555) relates that those who did not bring the club to the next village would be hanged and their homesteads burnt down.

When the people were assembled to a thing, the object was in the shape of an axe, or if the meeting concerned blasphemy, it was a cross.

The objects were signed with runes or other marks in order to indicate the reason for the assembly (e.g. election of king at the Stone of Mora), and who had sent them. During the Middle Ages, using buþkaflar was the official method of assembling people, and they were only allowed to be carved by certain officials, e.g. governors and sheriffs.

They were especially efficient, however, when they were used to levy people against royal oppression and high taxes. After the Dalecarlian rebellion of 1743, strong checks were placed on the use of bidding sticks.

In Sweden, the bidding stick was standardized during the village reorganizations in 1742, and it was at the village level that they were frequently used. During the 19th and 20th centuries, more specific messages were attached to the clubs or inserted into a hollow space. Still in the early 20th century, there was a paragraph in Swedish law that stated that the bidding stick would be sent between the villages if there was a forest fire. — Similar paragraphs were also present in the Finnish legislation concerning the correct use of arpakapula, or budkavle in Finland's Swedish, till the 20th century.

== Newspapers ==
The concept of the bidding stick has been used as the name for several newspapers, including the Norwegian papers Budstikka, Budstikken, and Bremanger Budstikke, and the Faroese paper Tingakrossur.

Bidding stick has many ways it can be grammatically in Norwegian. There's the bidding stick the object, and bidding stick as a name for something like a newspaper. Different newspapers might use different grammatical ways for spelling the word. These entities containing bidding stick as "names" can be completely unrelated to each other. Terms such as "Budstikken", "Budsikke", "Budstikka", all refer to a Bidding stick in newspapers.

=== List of some Norwegian newspapers ===
- Budstikken Weekly newspaper by a governmental commission (1808) Note: There's other newspapers with this name such as one from WW2
- Romsdals Budstikke used to be a newspaper for the Liberal Party, published in Molde, Norway (1884)
- Fredrikshalds Budstikke Norwegian newspaper published in Halden in Østfold county, by Chr. Olsen (1844). Note: Originally had the name "Budstikken av Fredrikshald"
- Flekkefjords Budstikke was a Norwegian newspaper, published in Flekkefjord (1874)
- Budstikka Daily local newspaper published out of Billingstad in Asker, Norway, by Jørgen Chr. Kanitz (1898)
- Søgne og Songdalen Budstikke local Norwegian newspaper covering the municipalities of Søgne and Songdalen (1990)
- Bremanger Budstikke a local Norwegian newspaper published in Svelgen in Vestland county by Geir Nybø. (2009)

=== Other newspapers with related names ===
- Tingakrossur (1901 published) was a Faroese newspaper, written primarily in Danish. Name comes from the Faroese common noun tingakrossur 'bidding stick'. Many of the newspaper's editors were leading politicians in the Home Rule Party and later it became the organ and party newspaper of the Home Rule Party (Faroese: Sjálvstýrisflokkurin) in 1906.
- Smaalenenes Amtstidende (1832 published) In 1852 the owner of Fredrikshalds Budstikke bought Smaalenenes Amtstidende and amalgamated the newspapers, but publishing continued under the latter name and Fredrikshalds Budstikke became defunct. Smaalenenes Amtstidende was the first newspaper in Østfold county.
