= I Didn't Know That =

- Genre: Science
- Created by: Richard Ambrose and Jonny Phillips
- Starring: Richard Ambrose and Jonny Phillips
- Narrated by: Vicki Butler-Henderson
- Country of origin: United Kingdom
- Original language: English
- No. of episodes: 31

Production
- Running time: 30 mins

Original release
- Network: National Geographic Channel
- Release: 2006

I Didn't Know That is a documentary television show hosted by British industrial scientists Richard Ambrose and Jonny Phillips. Since 2006, 30 episodes and a "DIY Green" special have been made. A new series is not expected as the National Geographic Channel has made other science programmes (including Planet Mechanics and What Would Happen If...?). In some episodes, the hosts nearly kill themselves in order to prove certain theories or to finish a dangerous experiment. In a certain episode section "Fact of Fiction", the show hosts seem to promote dowsing as an actual science.

== Episode 24 ==
Celebrates the 100th anniversary of the bra. Richard and Jonny discover that 80% of women wear the wrong size bra. In particular, this is because chest diameter and maximum breast diameter rather than the volume is measured. An English engineer doctor, Tyra, has developed a bra design with crossed straps in the back. That uses the weight of one breast to lift the other, using counterbalance. Standard designs constrict chest movement during breathing. One of the tools used in the development has been a projective differential shape body analyzer for 40 000 GBP.

== Reception ==
The Age reviewer Brad Newsome called the show "a fantastic source of pub trivia" and said "it all moves so fast that you don't have time to get anywhere near bored". Commenting on Richard Ambrose and Jonny Phillips wearing gorilla costumes to make a Bigfoot video, Karina Foo of the New Straits Times found it "entertaining to see two men in gorilla suits running head on to each other". According to the Leicester Mercury, the series is "packed full of unusual facts and fun experiments".
