= Eric Butler-Henderson =

British soldier and company director

Capt. The Hon. Eric Brand Butler-Henderson
- Born: Eric Brand Henderson; 26 September 1884; Norwood Green
- Died: 18 December 1953 (aged 69); Andover
- Spouse: Sophia Isabelle Butler Massey
- Relatives: Vicki Butler-Henderson; Charlie Butler-Henderson
- Military career
- Branch: British Army
- Service years: 1908–21
- Rank: Captain
- Unit: Berkshire (Hungerford) Yeomanry
- Memorials: GCR Class 11F locomotive no. 506 Butler–Henderson
- Other work: Company director

Capt. The Hon. Eric Brand Butler-Henderson (26 September 1884 – 18 December 1953) was the seventh child of Alexander Henderson, 1st Baron Faringdon, and the great-grandfather of Vicki (born 1972) and Charlie Butler-Henderson. He was a soldier and company director, who was honoured when a steam locomotive was named after him.

== Biography ==
Born Eric Brand Henderson on 26 September 1884 at Norwood Green in Middlesex, the son of Alexander and Jane Henderson, his father was a stock broker. He was schooled at Eton College. He married Sophia Isabelle Butler Massey (known as Zoë) on 10 December 1910, and on 21 December 1910 used a deed poll to legally change his name to Eric Brand Butler-Henderson. They had six children: Lionel (born 1911); Patrick (born 1913); Mary (born 1915); Edward (born 1916); Doreen (born 1920); and Kenneth (born 1929).

His eldest son Lionel Butler-Henderson raced cars for Frazer Nash in the 1930s; Lionel's second child Guy (born 1948) raced in the British Karting team; and two of Guy's children, Vicki (born 1972) and Charlie (born 1978), also became accomplished motor racing drivers.

By 1926, Eric Butler-Henderson was living at Winwick Manor, Rugby; in that year he was appointed one of the Sheriffs of Northamptonshire; in 1927 he was again appointed Sheriff for that county, and once again in 1928, but in 1929 was appointed High Sheriff of Northamptonshire.

Eric Butler-Henderson was appointed a Commander of the Most Venerable Order of the Hospital of Saint John of Jerusalem (C.St.J.) on 20 December 1937.

He died in Andover, Hampshire on 18 December 1953, aged 69.

== Army career ==
He was appointed to the Berkshire Imperial Yeomanry (as a second lieutenant) on 30 March 1908 and (when the Territorial Force was formed), transferred to the Berkshire (Hungerford) Yeomanry with a number of other officers on 1 April 1908, retaining his rank. He was promoted to temporary captain on 9 April 1915, and achieved the rank of captain on 20 December 1915. As part of the Mediterranean Expeditionary Force he was reported as wounded in 1915. He transferred from the Yeomanry to the Territorial Force Reserve on 6 November 1917, as a captain. He relinquished his Territorial Army Reserve commission on 30 September 1921, retaining his rank of captain but not the right to wear the uniform.

== Railways ==
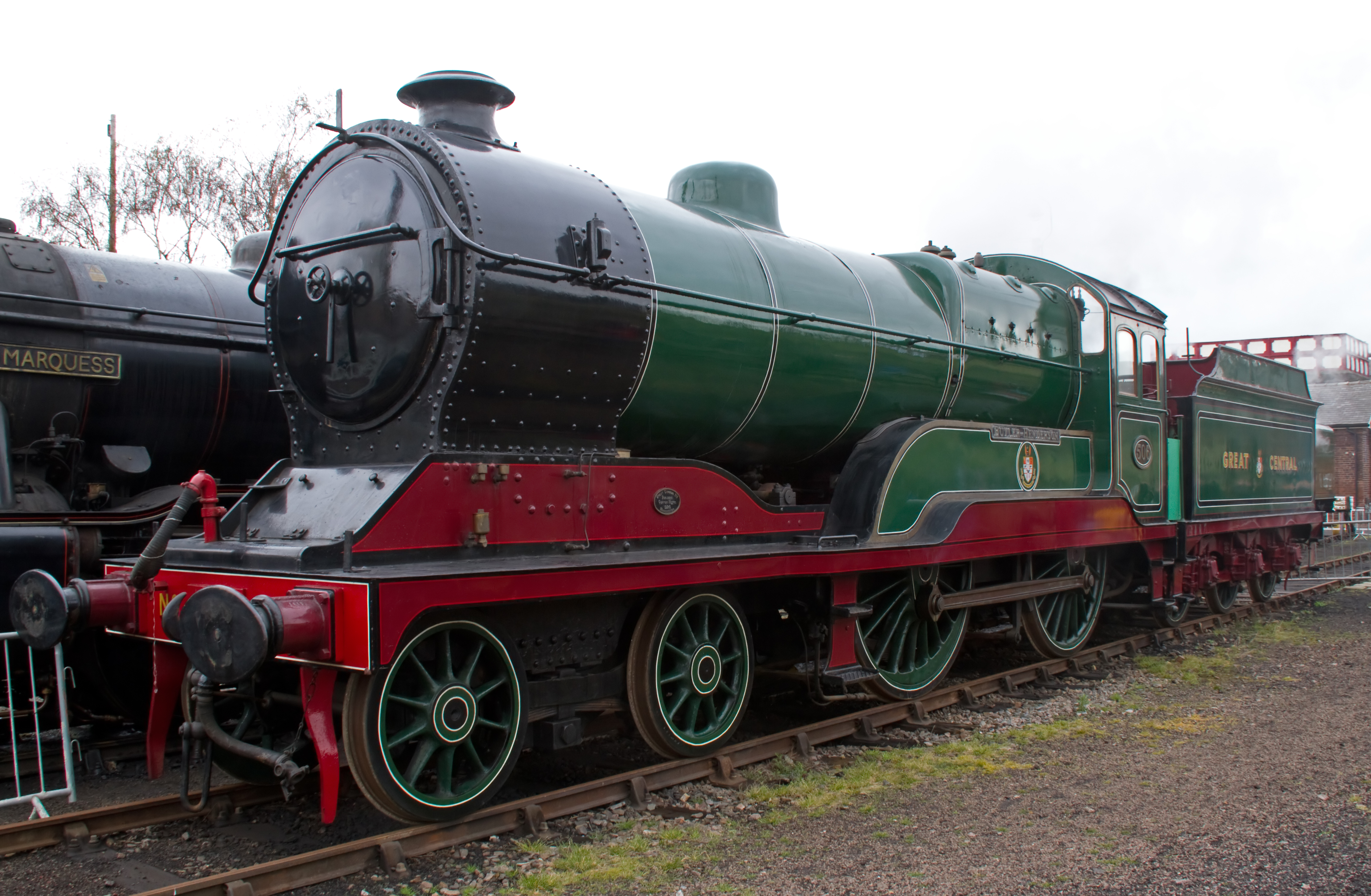
No. 506 Butler–Henderson

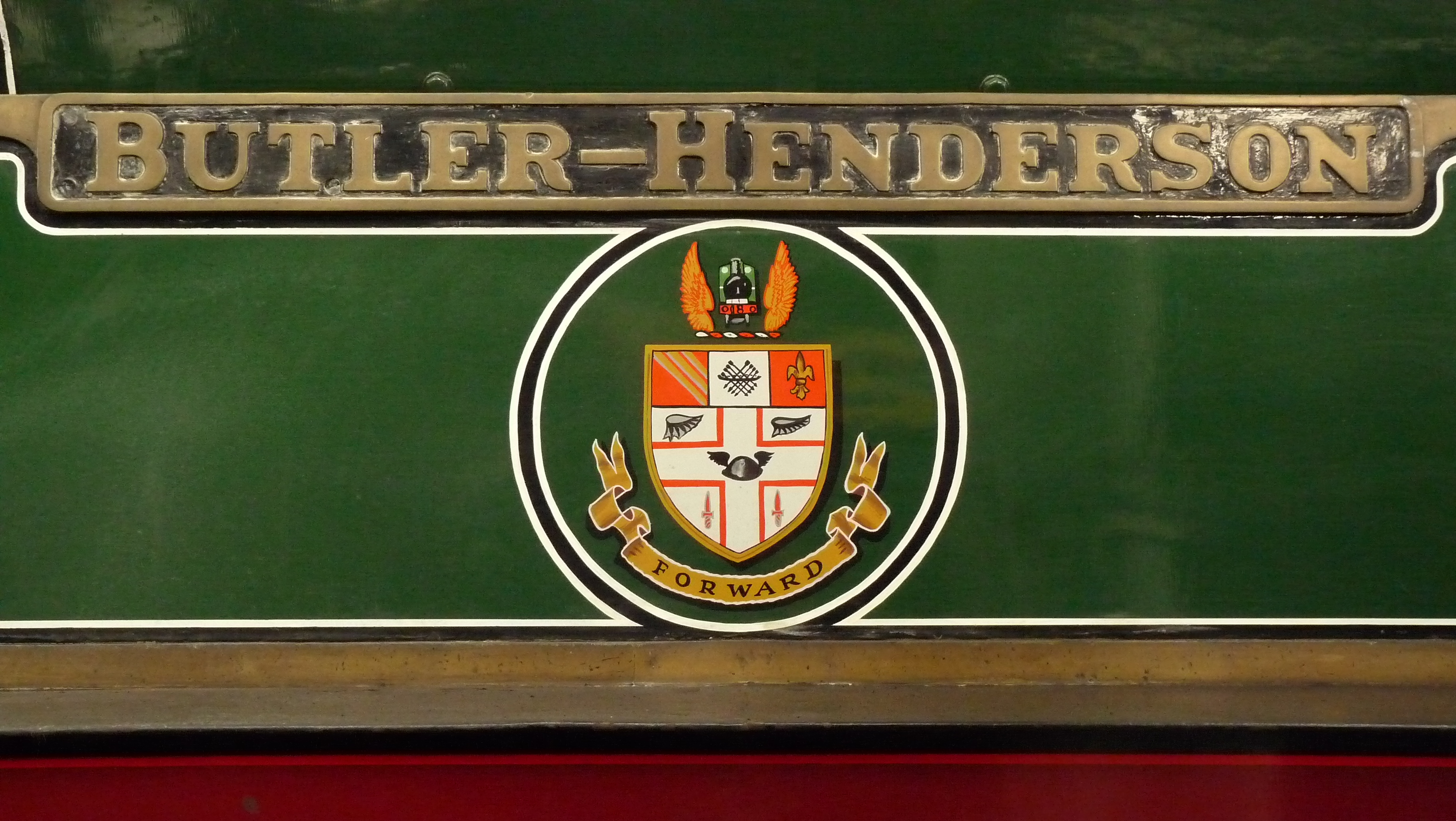
The nameplate of no. 506; the coat of arms is that of the Great Central Railway

In May 1918, Butler-Henderson was elected a Director of the Great Central Railway (GCR), where his father, Lord Faringdon, was chairman of the board. Like other GCR Directors of the period, he was accorded the honour of having one of the railway's latest express passenger locomotives named after him: no. 506, the first locomotive of GCR Class 11F, was named Butler–Henderson when it entered service on 27 December 1919.

Butler-Henderson was the last new Director of the GCR; at the start of 1923, the GCR amalgamated with several other railways to form the London & North Eastern Railway (LNER), and Butler-Henderson was one of four GCR nominees who became Directors of the LNER, his appointment being confirmed on 17 November 1922. He remained a director of the LNER until at least 1930. Locomotive no. 506 was also inherited by the LNER, and it latterly bore numbers 5506 (from June 1924), 2660 (from October 1946) and finally 62660 (from October 1949). It remained in service with the LNER and its successor, British Railways, until October 1960. After it was withdrawn from service, it was selected for preservation, being restored during 1961. It is part of the National Collection, and as of 25 November 2009 is on loan to Barrow Hill Engine Shed, where it is on static display.

He was a director of Catalinas Warehouses and Mole Co. Ltd., resigning upon the appointment of liquidators on 27 October 1953.
