= Tingakrossur =

1901–1990 Faroese newspaper

- Launched: 1901
- Ceased publication: 1990
- Political alignment: Home Rule Party
- Language: Faroese
- City: Tórshavn

Tingakrossur was a Faroese newspaper. The first copy of the paper was published on January 1, 1901 and it ceased publication in 1990. It was not published between 1955 and 1959.

Although the newspaper was initially written mainly in Danish, it was autonomy oriented, and later it became the organ and party newspaper of the Home Rule Party (Faroese: Sjálvstýrisflokkurin) in 1906. The avowed purpose of the paper was to promote education and fight against oppression. Poetry and prose held a central place in the newspaper, and the first Faroese novel, Rasmus Rasmussen's Babelstornið (The Tower of Babel, 1909), was published serially in it.

The newspaper's name comes from the Faroese common noun tingakrossur 'bidding stick'. A cross-shaped bidding stick was carried to summon people to the Løgting at Tinganes.

Many of the newspaper's editors were leading politicians in the Home Rule Party.

== Editors ==
- Kristin í Geil (a.k.a. Christen Holm-Isaksen), 1901–1911
- Sverri Patursson, 1911–1912
- Petur Alberg, 1912–1914
- Kristin í Geil, 1914–1935
- Eivind Isholm, 1935–1939
- S.E. Matras, 1940–1943
- Louis Zachariasen, 1943–1954
- Hans David Matras, 1960–1963
- Tummas Lenvig, 1963–1966
- Marius Johannesen, 1967–1978
- Hanna Absalonsen, 1979–1985
- Johan Petur Petersen, 1985–1987
- Petur Martin Rasmussen, 1988–1989
- Bergur Jacobsen, 1990
