= Bremanger Budstikke =

Local Norwegian newspaper

Bremanger Budstikke (lit. 'Bremanger Bidding Stick') is a local Norwegian newspaper published in Svelgen in Vestland county. Bremanger Budstikke covers events in Bremanger Municipality.

The newspaper was founded by and is edited by Geir Nybø. It was first published as a test edition in the fall of 2009. At that time, the plan was for it to be issued as a weekly paper on a permanent basis if at least 1,000 subscribers were registered. In its first year of operation, the newspaper had a circulation of 1,285, all subscribers. Due to falling circulation, its subsidy was cut by 36.7% in 2012, the most of any newspaper that year.

== Circulation ==
According to the Norwegian Audit Bureau of Circulations and National Association of Local Newspapers, Bremanger Budstikke has had the following annual circulation:

- 2010: 1,285
- 2011: 1,074
- 2012: 686
