= Budstikken =

Norwegian newspaper

Budstikken ('Bidding Stick') was a Norwegian newspaper.

It was started as a weekly newspaper by a governmental commission on 14 April 1808, to counter rumours and false information that arose because of the Gunboat War (1807–1814). Its first editor was Danish-born Norway-patriot Envold de Falsen. In 1808 Ludvig Stoud Platou took over. The newspaper gradually became the organ of the Norwegian Society for Development (Selskabet for Norges Vel), founded (partly by Platou) in 1809. After a break from January to February 1814, the newspaper continued with the subtitle "from the Norwegian Society for Development" until 11 July 1814, still with Platou as editor.

The newspaper and the people involved with it were especially concerned with the establishment of Norway's first university, which came in 1811.
