= Vicki Butler-Henderson =

British racing driver

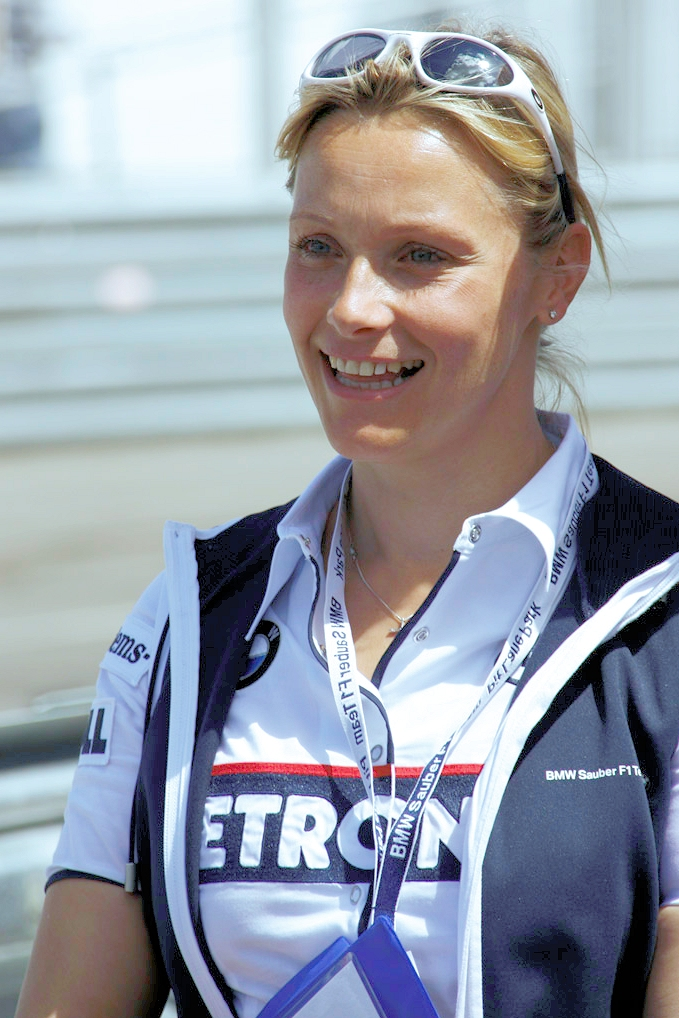
- Butler-Henderson in 2008
- Born: Victoria Jemma Butler-Henderson; 16 February 1972 (age 54); Hertfordshire, England
- Occupations: Racing driver Television presenter
- Years active: 1994–present
- Employer(s): BBC (1994–2001); Channel 5 (2002–2011); Discovery (2012–2014); Quest (2018–present)
- Known for: Top Gear (1994–2001) Fifth Gear (2002–present)
- Spouse: Phil Churchward (m. 2007)
- Children: 2

Victoria Jemma Butler-Henderson (born 16 February 1972) is a British racing driver, former presenter of Top Gear and current presenter of Fifth Gear.

== Biography ==
Butler-Henderson was born into a racing family. Her grandfather used to race a Frazer Nash at Brooklands, her father was in the British karting team and her brother Charlie is a racing driver. Butler-Henderson grew up on the family farm, and was educated at the independent schools St Francis' College in Letchworth and Perse School for Girls in Cambridge. She is the great-granddaughter of Eric Butler-Henderson, a director of the Great Central Railway, after whom the preserved GCR Class 11F locomotive Butler-Henderson is named.

Butler-Henderson started racing karts at the age of 12, being overtaken by David Coulthard in her first race. She holds a car race licence as well as a power boat racing licence. After supplementing her income as a racing instructor at Silverstone Circuit, she also undertook a dual career in journalism where she worked on numerous British motoring magazines including Auto Express, What Car? and Performance Car. She was the assistant launch editor and mechanic in Max Power magazine, referred to simply as "VBH."

=== Media career ===
In 1994, Butler-Henderson joined the BBC's flagship motoring show Top Gear. After the BBC cancelled the original show in 2001, Butler-Henderson, along with co-presenters Quentin Willson and Tiff Needell, moved to Channel 5 in 2002 to continue their work on a show called Fifth Gear. In 2004, she presented ITV's coverage of the British Touring Car Championship, in which her brother Charlie briefly competed in 2004; and from February 2006 the ten-part series Wrecks To Riches for Discovery Real Time. Also in 2004, she was a presenter for Formula Woman on ITV.

Butler-Henderson has in later years broadened her media career outside racing and cars to become a general presenter. After co-hosting radio shows on Virgin Radio, in 2005, she presented a daytime television show for ITV called Date My Daughter in which a single man 'dates' three mothers after which they decide if he is worthy enough to date their daughter.

Butler-Henderson has recorded voice overs for radio and television advertisements, including Wrigleys Extra Thin Ice and Sony Centres. She also provided a voiceover for the PlayStation 2 game Gran Turismo 4 Prologue. In January 2006, Butler-Henderson appeared in a TV commercial for the Kent & Medway Safety Camera Partnership in which she stated that the Partnership "don't want your cash, they just want you to slow down". Butler-Henderson was also a narrator for National Geographic Channel (UK)'s science documentary entitled I Didn't Know That. In 2009, she starred in several Dutch commercials for Toyota. She worked at Absolute Radio doing traffic news on the Christian O'Connell Breakfast Show. She left the breakfast show on 9 July 2009.

Butler-Henderson lent her views in the Golden Garages Award, a search for the United Kingdom's best garage run by Motor Codes. Butler-Henderson was part of a professional panel of six independent judges including the Telegraph's Honest John and motoring editor of Which? magazine, Richard Headland. She later presented the prize in person to the winners of the competition, Kinghams of Croydon.

In 2016, Butler-Henderson's fourteen-year stint at Fifth Gear ended after the show was cancelled. In 2018, the programme returned on Quest with all of the original presenters (incl. Butler-Henderson) returning.

Since 2019, Butler-Henderson and Alex Riley have co-presented The Car Years; a motoring series shown on ITV4.

=== Personal life ===
In 2007 Butler-Henderson married television producer and director Phil Churchward. Churchward worked on several motoring programmes as a producer of Fifth Gear, series director of Top Gear and The Grand Tour.

Butler-Henderson owns or has owned a Mk II VW Golf GTI, a Honda S2000, a Ducati Monster 750 and a Ford Ranger (T6) Raptor.
