= Oluf Falck-Ytter =

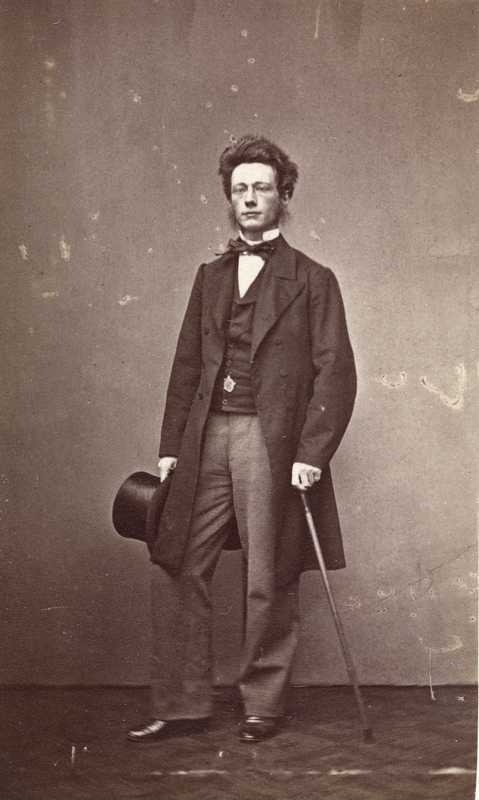
Oluf Vilhelm Falck-Ytter

Oluf Vilhelm Falck-Ytter (6 March 1832 – 24 October 1914) was a Norwegian jurist, civil servant, author, editor, and publisher.

== Biography ==
He was born in Stange in Hedmark county, Norway. He was a son of bailiff (fogt) Nils Ytter (1788–1868) and his wife Marie Dorothea Falck (1786–1867). After taking the cand.jur. degree in 1857 he spent his career in two civil jobs, as a civil servant in the Ministry of Finance from 1857 to 1884, and then as stipendiary magistrate in Sarpsborg city from 1884 to 1914.

He was active in the fledgling sports movement, predecessor of the present Norwegian Olympic Committee, and co-founded the skiing club Christiania SK and the shooting club Kristiania SL.

He wrote the gymnastics textbook Ude og inde. Om Legemsøvelser og Leg in 1867, and became involved in the production of children's magazines. He was asked to be an editorial board member of the magazine Børnenes Blad in 1864, and although he left in 1867, he started his own magazine For Ungdommen in 1868. It existed for three years, and in 1872 he took over Børnenes Blad and amalgamated his own magazine into it. The name of the new magazine was Børnenes Blad until 1884, except for the years 1875 to 1883 when the name For Ungdommen was used. The magazine went defunct in 1884 when Falck-Ytter moved to Sarpsborg.

Falck-Ytter also ran a publishing firm, Falck Ytters Forlag, which was established 1868. According to the work Norsk presses historie 1660–2010, he was the first editor-in-chief of the liberal newspaper Glommen, started in Sarpsborg in 1888, although he edited anonymously.

Falck-Ytter also wrote several books in the genres children's literature and young adult fiction. The best known book today is 1873's Haakon Haakonsen: En norsk Robinson ("Haakon Haakonsen: A Norwegian Robinson"), which was made into the 1990 Walt Disney Pictures film Shipwrecked. He also released books in 1871 and 1874, one in 1896 and three in 1913–1914.

Falck-Ytter was decorated with HM The King's Medal of Merit in gold in 1910. He was married to Gleny Louise Anziøn (1838–1925) from October 1860. He died in October 1914 in Kristiania.
