= Shipwrecked (1990 film) =

1990 film by Nils Gaup

- International theatrical release poster by John Alvin
- Directed by: Nils Gaup
- Written by: Nils Gaup; Bob Foss; Greg Dinner; Nick Thiel
- Based on: Haakon Haakonsen: En Norsk Robinson by Oluf Falck-Ytter
- Produced by: John M. Jacobsen; Nigel Wooll
- Starring: Stian Smestad; Gabriel Byrne
- Cinematography: Erling Thurmann-Andersen
- Edited by: Nils Pagh Andersen
- Music by: Patrick Doyle
- Production companies: Walt Disney Pictures; AB Svensk Filmindustri
- Distributed by: Buena Vista Pictures Distribution
- Release dates: 3 October 1990; (Norway); 1 March 1991 (United States); 1 August 1991 (Sweden)
- Running time: 93 minutes
- Countries: Norway; Sweden; United States
- Languages: Norwegian; English
- Budget: 60 million Norwegian Kroner (around $8.7 million in 1989)
- Box office: $17 million (Norway/USA)

Shipwrecked (Norwegian: Haakon Haakonsen) is a 1990 family action-adventure film directed by Nils Gaup and starring Stian Smestad and Gabriel Byrne. The film is a dramatization of Norwegian author Oluf Falck-Ytter's book Håkon Håkonsen. En norsk Robinson.

The film was produced by a consortium of Scandinavian companies and released in the US in an English-language version by Walt Disney Pictures.

== Plot ==
Haakon Haakonsen, a young Norwegian boy in the 1850s, becomes the sole support of his family as a cabin boy on a ship after his father is injured. Jens, who was a shipmate of Haakon's father and a friend of the Haakonsens, agrees to be a "sea daddy" to Haakon, teaching him seamanship and acting as an older brother during their voyage.

At first, Haakon has a difficult time adjusting to life at sea, but eventually earns the respect of his shipmates. After shore-leave in London, a British naval officer, Lieutenant Howell, joins the crew ostensibly to provide protection from pirates. Unbeknownst to the crew, he is actually a notorious pirate named John Merrick, who has murdered the real Howell and taken his identity. Haakon learns that "Howell" has secretly brought guns onto the ship, and Howell attempts to persuade Haakon not to say anything about the guns to the captain.

After the mysterious death of the admired captain (who had been poisoned by Howell's first mate), Howell assumes command. Upon arriving in Sydney, shore-leave is abruptly cancelled and a suspicious new batch of sailors come on board. After departing Australia, Haakon discovers a stowaway named Mary, who teaches Haakon to read English. Work on board the ship soon becomes terrible for Haakon, Jens, and the original sailors, which intensifies when the new captain finds Mary, he puts her in the brig and demands whoever has been stealing food for her to show his face. Haakon admits responsibility, and the captain sentences him to be lashed with the cat o' nine tails. Jens protests, saying that whipping Haakon would kill the boy, to which Howell orders that Jens will administer the punishment to Haakon instead of Howell. However, the court martial is interrupted by a terrible storm that damages the mainmast, then sinks the ship. Haakon manages to rescue Mary from the brig but in the confusion is separated from the crew and wakes alone up on a deserted tropical island.

After searching the island, Haakon discovers the wreck of the ship with its contents as well as hidden chests containing treasure, weapons and a newspaper clipping with a drawing of English pirate, Merrick. Haakon realises Merrick is actually Howell, and the suspicious shipmates are really pirates, who hid their treasure during a hot pursuit from naval forces.

Following a self-training with a sword and gun, Haakon manages to use a bugle when a gorilla attacks. This makes the gorilla docile, who then starts to befriend Haakon, behaving like a pet. Haakon devises a set of booby traps anticipating that the pirates will soon return for their treasure. Although Haakon adjusts to the island, he misses Jens, and more so his family back in Norway. One day, Haakon uses a telescope and sees smoke from a distant island and tries various attempts to get there on a raft of his own.

Upon successfully arriving there, he finds a village of natives doing a night dance. Haakon encounters Mary wearing a native dress and native shoes in the middle of an altercation with several of the natives. Misinterpreting the situation, Haakon reveals himself and frightens the natives with a gunshot until he backs into Jens, who explains that the natives are peaceful and saved his and Mary's lives. The reunited trio happily depart for Haakon's island the next day.

Shortly thereafter, the three friends witness the arrival of Merrick and his crew on a new ship, along with Berg and Steine, two of Jens' friends who survived the sinking ship and are being held prisoner. After Haakon's traps fail to work, he quickly devises a plan to save their friends. At night, Mary sneaks aboard the ship and frees the remaining crew who manage to overpower their guards and take the pirate ship. Meanwhile, on land, Haakon and Jens manage to distract the pirates long enough to free Berg and Steine and narrowly make it back to the ship whilst being chased by the pirates. Mary uses the ship's cannon to destroy the pursuing boat containing Merrick and his men, stranding them on the island. Haakon, Jens, Mary and the liberated crew return to their native Norway.

Back home in Norway, Haakon reunites with his family, revealing he has bought the family farm with his new wealth and introduces them to Mary. His parents agree to take her in until she can re-establish contact with her own relatives.

== Cast ==
- Stian Smestad as Haakon Haakonson, a Norwegian youth who signs on as cabin boy aboard a ship whose captain is his father's close friend. At first he is shy and timid from years of being teased and picked on because he is poor, but after being stranded alone on the island and forced to survive, he becomes more confident.
- Gabriel Byrne as John Merrick, a pirate captain who poses as a member of the English military. He eventually takes over the ship Haakon is on after the original captain mysteriously dies, and proceeds to make life difficult for everyone.
- Trond Peter Stamsø Munch as Jens, a friend of Haakon's family and a sailor who sailed with Haakon's father. He considers himself Haakon's guardian on the ship and promises Haakon's father to look out for him.
- Louisa Milwood-Haigh as Mary, a young stowaway searching for her uncle in Calcutta. She escaped from a workhouse in Australia, where she was placed after the death of her parents.
- Knut Walle as Berg, one of Jens' shipmates.
- Harald Brenna as Steine, one of Jens' shipmates.
- Kjell Stormoen as the captain of the ship that Haakon and Jens work on, who gets killed by Merrick.

== Production ==
The original 1873 Norwegian novel, aimed at young readers, was inspired by another adventure classic, Daniel Defoe's 1719 novel Robinson Crusoe.

The film was shot on location in Fiji, Norway, Spain and the United Kingdom in July to October 1989.

In the original version of the film, the Norwegian characters speak Norwegian to each other and English to English characters, while the English characters speak English only. In the international version, all lines in Norwegian are dubbed over in English, in most cases by the Norwegian actors themselves.

== Reception ==
The film received favorable reviews as a well-made adventure movie for all ages.

It grossed $15.1 million in the United States and Canada and $1.3 million in Norway.

=== Awards ===
Shipwrecked was nominated for three Young Artist Awards in 1992:

- Best Family Motion Picture — Drama
- Best Young Actor Starring in a Motion Picture — Stian Smestad
- Best Young Actress Co-starring in a Motion Picture — Louisa Milwood-Haigh
