= The Antiquary =

1816 novel by Walter Scott

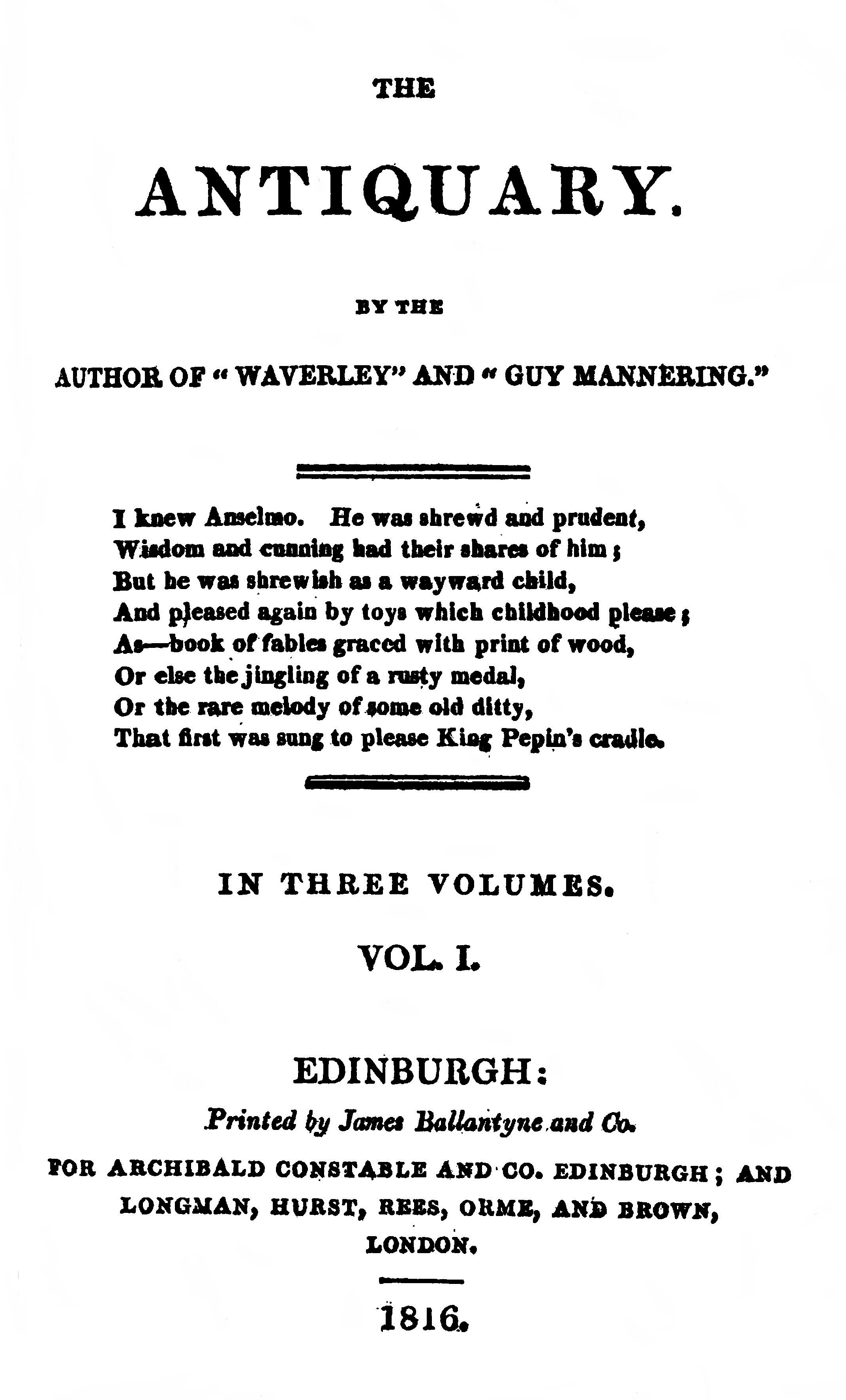
- Author: Walter Scott
- Language: English, Lowland Scots
- Series: Waverley Novels
- Genre: Historical novel
- Publisher: Archibald Constable (Edinburgh); Longman, Rees, Orme, Brown and Green (London)
- Publication date: 4 May 1816
- Publication place: Scotland
- Media type: Print
- Pages: 356 (Edinburgh Edition, 1995)
- Preceded by: Guy Mannering
- Followed by: The Black Dwarf

The Antiquary, the third of the Waverley novels published in 1816 by Walter Scott, centres on the character of an antiquary: an amateur historian, archaeologist and collector of items of dubious antiquity. He is the eponymous character and for all practical purposes the hero, though the characters of Lovel and Isabella Wardour provide the conventional love interest. The Antiquary was Scott's own favourite of his novels, and is one of his most critically well-regarded works; H. J. C. Grierson, for example, wrote that "Not many, apart from Shakespeare, could write scenes in which truth and poetry, realism and romance, are more wonderfully presented."

Scott wrote in an advertisement to the novel that his purpose in writing it, similar to that of his novels Waverley and Guy Mannering, was to document Scottish life of a certain period, in this case the last decade of the 18th century. The action can be located in July and August 1794. It is, in short, a novel of manners, and its theme is the influence of the past on the present. In tone it is predominantly comic, though the humour is offset with episodes of melodrama and pathos.

Scott included a glossary of Scottish terms as an appendix to the novel.

== Composition ==
Scott contracted to write The Antiquary in January 1815 with a publication date of 4 June, but a substantial part of the year was taken up with other commitments, social and literary, the most substantial being his expedition to Belgium and France which resulted in the poems The Field of Waterloo and 'The Dance of Death' and Paul's Letters to His Kinsfolk. Composition seems to have begun at the end of the year and was complete, apart from the glossary, by mid-April 1816.

== Editions ==
The Antiquary appeared in three volumes in Edinburgh on 4 May 1816, published by Archibald Constable and Co., and in London on 8 May, published by Longman, Hurst, Rees, Orme, and Brown. As with all the Waverley novels before 1827 publication was anonymous. The price was £1 4s (£1.20). This first edition of 6000 copies was followed by a revised second edition some three months later. There is no clear evidence for authorial involvement in this, or in any of the novel's subsequent appearances except for the 18mo Novels and Tales (1823) and the 'Magnum' edition. Some of the small changes to the text in 1823 are attributable to Scott, but that edition was a textual dead end. In October 1828 he provided the novel with an introduction and notes, and revised the text, for the Magnum edition in which it appeared as Volumes 5 and 6 in October and November 1829.

The standard modern edition, by David Hewitt, was published as Volume 3 of the Edinburgh Edition of the Waverley Novels in 1995: this is based on the first edition, corrected from the manuscript and incorporating verbal changes introduced in the second edition; the Magnum material appears in Volume 25a.

== Plot summary ==
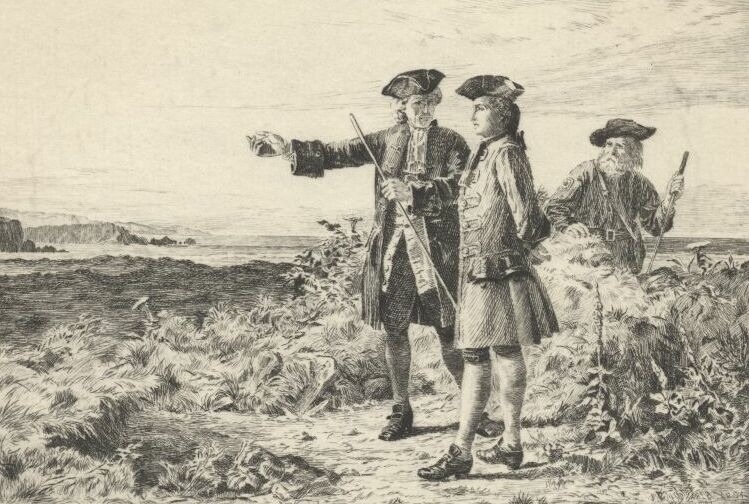
Oldbuck shows Lovel an historical landmark

At the opening of the story, Lovel meets Oldbuck while taking a coach from Edinburgh. Oldbuck, interested as he is in antiquities, has with him Gordon's Itinerarium, a book about Roman ruins. The book interests Lovel, to the surprise of Oldbuck, and by their shared interest the two become friends. Oldbuck invites Lovel to come to Monkbarns and takes the opportunity of a willing listener to divulge his ancient knowledge. In the process of which, Oldbuck shows Lovel a plot of land he purchased at great cost where he found an inscription "A.D.L.L", which Oldbuck takes to mean "Agricola Dicavit Libens Lubens". Edie Ochiltree, the local beggar, disputes the antiquary's history, in one of the more amusing scenes of the story (see image at left).

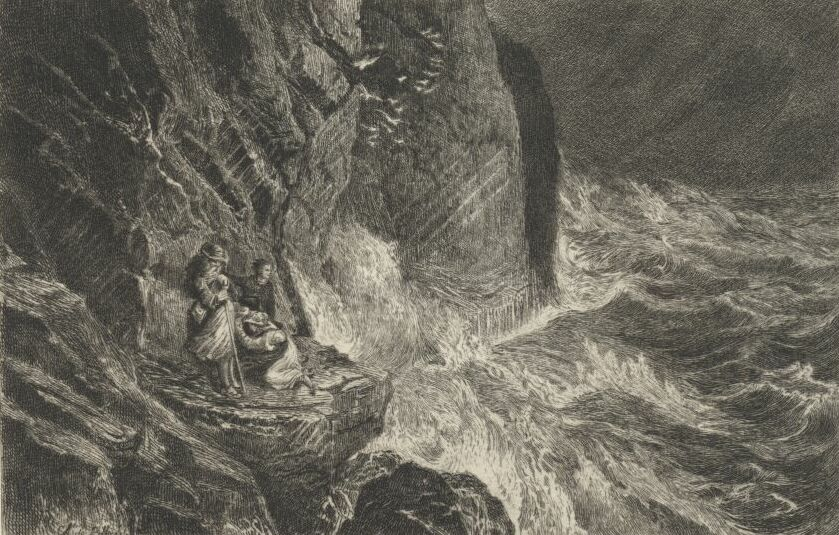
Taking refuge on a cliff

Oldbuck decides to introduce Lovel to his good friend, Sir Arthur Wardour. When Sir Arthur arrives, Lovel meets Arthur's daughter, Isabella and the two realize they have seen each other before. Because Lovel is illegitimate, she knows her father would not approve of a marriage between them. When she sees Lovel standing in the road waiting to talk to her, she convinces her father to take the long way home, walking down to the beach. Luckily, Edie Ochiltree, having the insight that someone may be trapped on the beach not knowing that the tide was coming in, finds the Wardours and helps them escape the rising waters. Then, Lovel appears and gets them to relative safety, huddling on the side of a rocky cliff. Finally, Oldbuck arrives with men and ropes to pull the four up over the cliff to safety.

A while later, Oldbuck takes Lovel, the Wardours, his niece and nephew, Dousterswivel and a minister to the ancient ruins of Saint Ruth on Sir Arthur's property. While exploring the property, they discuss an ancient treasure that they believe to be buried at the ruins. Captain M'Intyre dominates Isabella's attention, which she leaves in favor of Lovel's to the dismay of M'Intyre. M'Intyre, angered at this slight, discovers that Lovel is in the military, but realizes he knows of no one named Lovel in his division and calls him out upon the topic. They agree to a duel and return to the scene to fight for their individual honor. Lovel's bullet strikes best and leaves M'Intyre bleeding on the ground, when Lovel flees with Edie to avoid a potential arrest. In their hiding, Edie and Lovel see Dousterswivel and Sir Arthur return to the ruins, looking for treasure. They see Dousterswivel attempting to convince Sir Arthur of his magical abilities to find gold and he does conveniently find a small bag under a stone. After they leave, Lovel boards a military ship and departs.

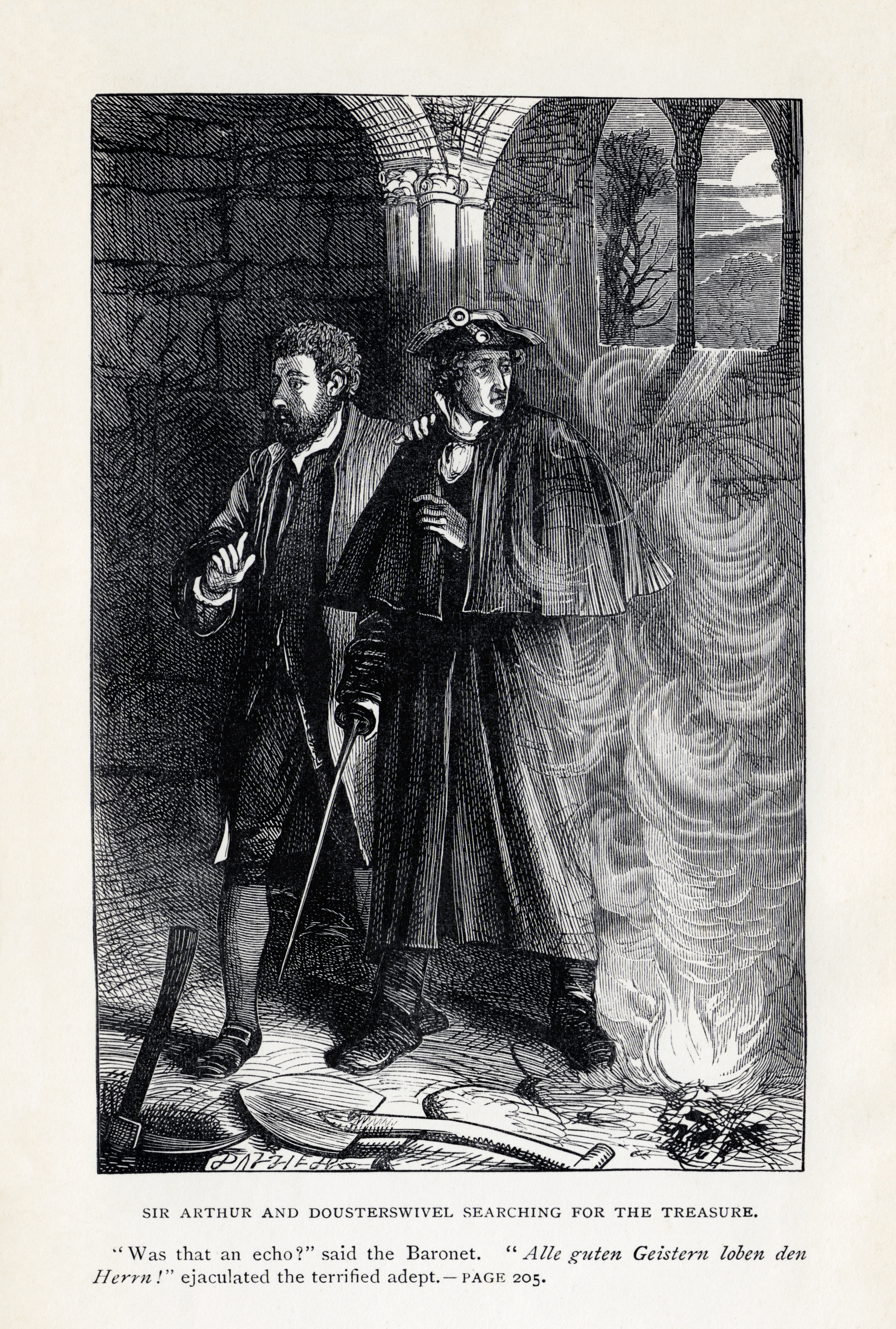
Sir Arthur and Dousterswivel Searching for the Treasure, the Dalziel Brothers, 1886.

Oldbuck, understanding Dousterswivel's knavery, confronts him about his cons and takes Sir Arthur back to the ruins to look for treasure without Dousterswivel's magical intervention. Digging further under the same stone under which Dousterswivel had previously found treasure, they discover a chest full of silver, which Sir Arthur promptly takes back home. Edie hangs behind and whispers for Dousterswivel to join him. Then, showing the con artist the lid to the chest, with the phrase "Search 1" written on it. Edie convinces the German mage that this phrase means there is a second chest nearby, this time full of gold. They return at night and dig, but cannot find another chest. Just as Dousterswivel is starting to realize that Edie is mocking him, Steenie Mucklebackit jumps from the shadows and knocks Dousterswivel unconscious.

Steenie and Edie flee to Steenie's house, where Steenie shows him Dousterswivel's pocketbook, accidentally picked up during the excitement. Edie makes him promise to return the pocketbook and then leaves. Alas, Steenie is not long for this world and dies in a fishing accident the next day. As the family is in mourning, Elspeth, Steenie's grandmother, comes out of a long senility to tell Edie to take a ring and a message to Lord Glenallan. Oldbuck, whose land the Mucklebackits occupy, comes to help carry the casket and pay his respects, to the awe and thanks of the family.

Edie meets Lord Glenallan and gives him the ring and tells him to go visit Elspeth. Glenallan does and learns from her his own history. He had married a woman named Eveline Neville, who his mother helped convince was his sister after she had already become pregnant. Eveline attempts to commit suicide by jumping into the sea. She is taken from the water barely alive and dies after giving birth. The child is taken by another maid named Theresa and is raised by Glenallan's younger brother as his own illegitimate son. Glenallan does not know this. Glenallan never recovers from believing that he committed a violation of nature. Elspeth tells him that Eveline was not his sister and that his marriage with her was perfectly legitimate. It relieves his mind and he desires to find his son.

Meanwhile, Edie is arrested for attacking Douster-swivel. Oldbuck proves that Dousterswivel is merely a thief and frees Edie, who immediately goes upon a mission. Oldbuck then receives word that Sir Arthur, who has been heavily in debt, is under arrest and has the valuables of his home being taken. Edie returns with money sent by Wardour's son and an order to stop the arrest.

Finally, a mistake causes the national warning system—a series of towers with fires that can be lit to warn of invasion—to be lit and everyone believes the French are invading. Oldbuck dons his sword and travels to town to help with defence along with his nephew, who promptly assumes the role of a commander. As they prepare for the defence, Lord Glenallan comes in with his highland troops. Finally, Lovel and Captain Wardour arrive to take command of the defence and it is revealed that Lovel is actually Major Neville. Further, Oldbuck realizes that Major Neville is Glenallan's son and the two are reunited. Major Neville becomes the next Lord Glenallan and is now free to marry Isabella Wardour.

== Characters ==
Principal characters in bold

- William Lovel, afterwards **Lord Geraldin, Earl of Glenallan**
- Mrs Macleuchar, proprietress of the Edinburgh-Queensferry coach
- **Jonathan Oldbuck**, of Monkbarns
- Miss Griselda Oldbuck, his sister
- Mary MacIntyre, his niece
- Jenny Rintherout, his maid
- **Captain Hector MacIntyre**, his nephew
- Mr Lesley, Hector's military friend
- Jacob Caxon, a barber
- Jenny Caxon, his daughter
- Lieutenant Richard Taffril, her sweetheart
- **Edie Ochiltree**, a licensed mendicant
- **Sir Arthur Wardour**, of Knockwinnock Castle
- Captain Reginald Wardour, his son
- **Isabella Wardour**, his daughter
- Ringan Aikwood, his estate officer
- **Herman Dousterswivel**, a charlatan
- Mrs Mailsetter, postmistress of Fairport
- Davie Mailsetter, her son
- Mrs Heukbane
- Mrs Shortcake
- Mr Blattergowl, minister of Trotcosey
- Miss Rebecca Blattergo, his sister
- **Elspeth Mucklebackit**, of the Craigburnfoot
- Saunders Mucklebackit, her son
- Joscelind, Countess of Glenallan
- William, Earl of Glenallan, her son
- Eveline Neville, his late wife
- Francie Macraw, his porter
- Baillie Littlejohn

== Chapter summary ==
Volume One

Ch. 1: Two gentlemen, one elderly the other young, travelling independently, take the coach from Edinburgh to South Queensferry.

Ch. 2: The narrator provides a sketch of the older man, Jonathan Oldbuck. Oldbuck and young William Lovel dine at the Hawes inn and travel on to Fairport.

Ch. 3: Oldbuck introduces Lovel to his antiquarian 'sanctum sanctorum' at Monkbarns.

Ch. 4: Edie Ochiltree, a licensed beggar, indicates that what Oldbuck takes to be a Roman praetorium is of modern construction.

Ch. 5: Oldbuck (a Whig) invites his Tory neighbour Sir Arthur Wardour and his daughter Isabella to meet Lovel at dinner.

Ch. 6: Sir Arthur and Oldbuck have an antiquarian dispute at dinner, after which the Wardours choose to walk home by the sands to avoid meeting Lovel again. Jacob Caxon the barber expresses his concern about their safety.

Ch. 7: On the sands Edie warns the Wardours, but it is too late and they are all cut off by the tide. Lovel climbs down the cliff to help them.

Ch. 8: The rescue is completed.

Ch. 9: Lovel is to be put up in the Green Room at Monkbarns, which Griselda Oldbuck indicates has a reputation for being haunted by the spirit of the printer Aldobrand Oldenbuck.

Ch. 10: In the Green Room Lovel dreams of Aldobrand.

Ch. 11: At breakfast Oldbuck and Lovel discuss Aldobrand, after which they go to the beach to buy fish.

Ch. 12: Isabella offers Edie a place, but he declines, preferring his peripatetic existence. He indicates that he has seen her rebuffing Lovel at a recent secret meeting and urges her to treat him well.

Ch. 13: Isabella tells Lovel that she can never return his love. Oldbuck informs him of the charlatan Dousterswivel's plans to take advantage of the impecunious Sir Arthur's gullibility.

Ch. 14: Lovel allows Oldbuck to believe that he is a budding poet.

Ch. 15: At the post office Mrs Mailsetter and her gossips examine the incoming mail, and an express letter to Lovel is entrusted to little Davie Mailsetter.

Volume Two

Ch. 1 (16): Oldbuck visits Lovel, who says he is in mourning for a friend.

Ch. 2 (17): On a general excursion to the ruins of St Ruth's priory, Dousterswivel finds water by divining.

Ch. 3 (18): Still at St Ruth's, Lovel reads to the company Isabella's version of the German story of Martin Waldeck.

Ch. 4 (19): Oldbuck's nephew Hector MacIntyre arrives, pays attention to Isabella, and quarrels with Lovel.

Ch. 5 (20): Next morning, Mr Lesley makes arrangements with Lovel for a duel with Hector, his friend. Edie's attempts to prevent the encounter are ignored and Hector is wounded.

Ch. 6 (21): Edie conceals Lovel at St Ruth's, where they overhear Dousterswivel duping Sir Arthur. Lovel is taken off by Lieutenant Taffril, who had acted as his second.

Ch. 7 (22): Sir Arthur shows Oldbuck a cache of old coins, which he has witnessed Dousterswivel dig up at St Ruth's with the promise of more to come.

Ch. 8 (23): Oldbuck, Sir Arthur, and Dousterwivel find silver ingots by digging in a place indicated by Edie at St Ruth's.

Ch. 9 (24): Dousterswivel agrees to look for more treasure with Edie who assures him it is present.

Ch. 10 (25): Dousterwsivel digs, but he is beaten by a mysterious dark figure. He witnesses the Roman Catholic burial service for the Countess of Glenallan, and is offered accommodation by Sir Arthur's estate officer Ringan Aikwood.

Ch. 11 (26): Old Elspeth of the fishing family at Craigburnfoot is told of the Countess' death and comments on her pride. Steenie and Edie arrive, having been chased by one of the funeral party: Steenie says he was Dousterswivel's assailant.

Ch. 12 (27): Elspeth sends Edie to Glenallan with a token ring to summon the Earl to come to her. He is admitted by Francie Macraw, the porter.

Ch. 13 (28): Edie delivers his message to Glenallan.

Ch. 14 (29): Edie hears that Steenie Mucklebackit has been drowned. He is arrested for the assault on Dousterswivel.

Volume Three

Ch. 1 (30): Oldbuck and Hector proceed light-heartedly to Steenie's funeral.

Ch. 2 (31): Steenie's funeral.

Ch. 3 (32): Glenallan arrives to speak to Elspeth.

Ch. 4 (33): Elspeth tells Glenallan of her part in bringing about the death in childbirth of his wife Eveline, hated by the late Countess and herself, and of the disappearance of his infant son.

Ch. 5 (34): Glenallan relays Elspeth's account to Oldbuck, who had unconsciously been his rival in seeking Eveline's affection.

Ch. 6 (35): At Monkbarns Glenallan and Oldbuck plan action to locate the Earl's son.

Ch. 7 (36): Caxon tells Oldbuck of reactions in the village to the unwonted appearance at Monkbarns of Glenallan, who bonds with the family at breakfast.

Ch. 8 (37): Edie is unresponsive before the unsympathetic Baillie Littlejohn, but Oldbuck arrives and persuades the magistrate to hand the examination over to him.

Ch. 9 (38): Oldbuck grants Edie bail after hearing his version of events.

Ch. 10 (39): Oldbuck takes Hector and Edie to see Elspeth.

Ch. 11 (40): Elspeth dies without imparting any further information. Oldbuck receives a summons to Knockwinnock.

Ch. 12 (41): Sir Arthur is faced with financial ruin. Isabella meets Edie, who seems to have a secret which will help the family.

Ch. 13 (42): At his request, and with Hector's help, Edie is provided with transport to Tannonburgh, the next post town. Sir Arthur is arrested for debt.

Ch. 14 (43): Edie returns with a letter from Sir Arthur's son Reginald announcing that 'the generosity of a matchless friend' has enabled him to discharge his father's debts.

Ch. 15 (44): Edie and Oldbuck laugh together as the plot is further tied up: Lovel had arranged for the ingots to be buried at St Ruth's for Sir Arthur's benefit.

Ch. 16 (45): The local militia assemble when a beacon gives warning of a French invasion, but this is revealed to be a false alarm on the arrival of Major Neville, who turns out to be Glenallan's lost son, and is married a month later to Isabella.

== Reception ==
Most of the reviewers considered that The Antiquary maintained the high standards set by Waverley and Guy Mannering, especially in its insights into human nature and its delineation of manners, and in the big set scenes of the rescue from the tide and the fisherman's funeral. The figure of Edie Ochiltree attracted particular praise, recalling Meg Merrilees from Guy Mannering but in a more natural mode. Oldbuck was also generally admired, though The European Magazine considered him tediously minute. Lovel's disappearance from the action and Isabella Wardour's ineffectiveness were seen as blemishes, and the plot as a whole was often judged ill-conducted, especially the abruptness of the winding up. The Monthly Review, The Quarterly Review, and The New Monthly Magazine all considered the author's claim to have followed an overall plan in the first three novels to be wisdom after the event.
