= Fredrikshalds Budstikke =

Norwegian newspaper

Fredrikshalds Budstikke was a Norwegian newspaper, published in Halden in Østfold county.

Budstikken av Fredrikshald (Fredrikshald was the old name of Halden) was started on 2 January 1844 by Chr. Olsen. On 1 January 1846 it changed its name to Fredrikshalds Budstikke. It lasted until the 1850s. The newspaper's owners bought the competitor newspaper Smaalenenes Amtstidende in 1852, but soon discontinued publication under the name Fredrikshalds Budstikke. The last edition came on 29 December 1853, while Smaalenenes Amtstidende lived on.
