= Halden (newspaper) =

Norwegian newspaper

- Type: Newspaper
- Founded: 1882
- Ceased publication: 1941
- Political alignment: Liberal
- Headquarters: Halden, Østfold, Norway
- Circulation: 1,500 (1932)

Halden was a Norwegian newspaper, published in Halden in Østfold county.

Halden was started in 1882 as a liberal competitor to the city's dominant, conservative newspaper Smaalenenes Amtstidende. The first editor was Jens Olsen. Sigurd Østensen Sandberg later took over informally, then formally from 1906 until his death in 1931. From the same year the newspaper was jointly printed with Glommen. The circulation was stable at around 1,500 copies in both 1920 and 1932.

The newspaper struggled to survive, and the German occupation of Norway worsened the situation. The last edition of Halden came on 1 October 1941. The stop came at the same time as Glommen was forcibly shut down, and neither newspaper returned.
