= Lord Glenallan =

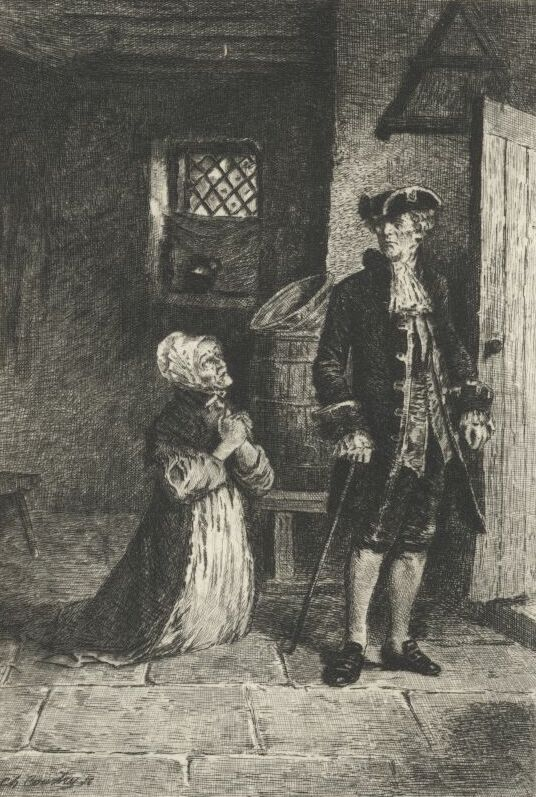
- Elspeth Mucklebackit and Lord Glenallan, engraved by Charles Courtry from a design by Alfred Holst Tourrier
- First appearance: The Antiquary (1816)
- Created by: Walter Scott

In-universe information
- Full name: William, Earl of Glenallan, formerly Lord Geraldin
- Occupation: Laird
- Spouse: Eveline Neville
- Children: William Neville, alias Lovel
- Religion: Roman Catholic
- Nationality: Scottish

William, Earl of Glenallan, otherwise Lord Glenallan, is a character in Sir Walter Scott's 1816 novel The Antiquary, a Scottish aristocrat whose life has been ruined by the suicide of his wife and the belief that he has unwittingly committed incest. His story forms the melodramatic Gothic strand in an otherwise largely realistic comic novel.

== Role ==
Lord Glenallan first makes a brief appearance in the novel as the chief mourner at the midnight funeral procession of his mother, the Countess of Glenallan, near the north-eastern Scottish town of Fairport. Later, a former servant of his, the half-senile Elspeth Mucklebackit, learns of the Countess's death and persuades the beggar Edie Ochiltree to go to Lord Geraldin, now become Earl of Glenallan in succession to the Countess, and tell him that she wishes to see him before she dies. We are told that the Glenallans are a Catholic family, that the present earl has for many years lived a life of withdrawn and melancholy devotion to his religion, and that he had a younger brother called Edward, now dead. Ochiltree finds Lord Glenallan a wreck of a man, old beyond his years, and apparently in deep penance for some hideous crime. He tells the earl that Elspeth wishes to confide to him something of great importance that hangs on her conscience. As he leaves Glenallan House the beggar learns from an old family servant that the earl had in his youth loved a woman called Eveline Neville, a cousin of his, but that she had committed suicide.

Glenallan responds to the summons by visiting the Mucklebackit cottage, and there finds the whole family in mourning for Elspeth's drowned grandson, young Steenie Mucklebackit who has been buried that day. Steenie's parents wish to deny him admittance, but Elspeth takes command and sends them out. She reminds Glenallan of the arrival in his life many years ago of Eveline Neville, the young woman with whom he fell in love, and tells him that his mother opposed their marriage because the birth of any son to them would deprive her of her legal rights to the Glenallans' house and estate. She hoped to prevent such a match by telling him falsely that Eveline was his own half-sister, and not the cousin she claimed to be, but she was unaware that the two lovers had some months before married secretly. When Eveline was told her husband was also her half-brother she was so overcome by horror and despair that she threw herself from a cliff into the sea, but was recovered from the waves, and before dying gave birth to a premature baby. The whole business was hushed up, the baby was taken away, and Elspeth is unable to say what its fate was. Here they are interrupted by a visit from Jonathan Oldbuck, who we discover had also been a suitor of Eveline Neville. Oldbuck leaves the house to avoid the unpleasant memories his rival evokes, but Glenallan persuades Oldbuck to listen to his story. When he hears the full story, and learns for the first time of the supposed incest and actual deception, Oldbuck is won over to the earl's cause and promises to help him discover the baby and prove its legitimacy. He invites him to Monkbarns, the Oldbuck family home, and the uproarious household there show the gloomy earl its best hospitality, though Glenallan follows his usual practice of eating with penitential sparingness. Oldbuck gives reasons for believing that the baby was not killed, but rather spirited off to the earl's younger brother and raised by him. He promises to set enquiries on foot, and the two men part on the best of terms.

The novel ends with the neighbourhood being set into turmoil by an invasion scare, to which all respond by rallying round their country's cause. Glenallan raises a body of troops from his vast Lowland and Highland estates and leads them in person to Fairport, where he meets a cavalry officer called Major Neville, who has been sent with the news that the invasion is a false alarm. Glenallan has already privately learned that Neville is his younger brother's foster-son, and on meeting him he is immediately struck by the man's resemblance to Eveline and recognizes him as his own long-lost son.

== Character ==
Lord Glenallan is almost the only representative in the novel of the old feudal Scotland, now in the last stages of decline. His character is dominated by his sense of loss over the disappearance of his son, and by the all-consuming Catholic guilt he feels over his supposedly incestuous marriage, which leads him to a life of despondent penitence and which he has come to self-destructively embrace. Though the finding of his son is the only redemption he can aspire to, he is emotionally incapacitated from taking any positive action toward that end, and when he finally recognizes Major Neville he cannot hope to resume any real life, but can only wait for death.

== Sources ==
Glenallan's gloomy and penitential withdrawal from secular life reminded A. N. Wilson of the austerely pious Philip II of Spain, but it might alternatively have been modelled on Lord Byron. When the two met in 1815, the year that Scott began writing The Antiquary, he told Byron that he did not, like some, expect him to convert to Methodism: “I would rather look to see you retreat upon the Catholic faith, and distinguish yourself by the austerity of your penances.” The theme of Glenallan's marriage to his supposed half-sister Eveline was almost certainly inspired by the scandal of Byron's affair with his half-sister Augusta.

== Critical assessment ==
Early 19th century opinions about the Glenallan strand of the story diverged sharply. In a contemporary review of The Antiquary the British Lady’s Magazine protested against “the illiberality of appropriating dark and horrible doings to Catholic families” and criticized the melodrama of the Glenallan story as being unfitted to a story with a modern setting. On the other hand, the Radical critic William Hazlitt some years later was thoroughly pleased by “that striking picture of the effects of feudal tyranny and fiendish pride”, while Scott's biographer J. G. Lockhart thought that his “highest art, that of skilful contrast” was nowhere better exemplified than in his setting off of the Glenallan story against the Oldbuck one.

20th century critics were also split. Peter Cochran found the scene between Glenallan and Elspeth “very moving”, and John Buchan wrote approvingly that “the dark stateliness of the Glenallans…skirts, but does not stumble into, melodrama”, but Edgar Johnson found Lord Glenallan not only melodramatic but insufficiently realized for us to care about the final clearing up of all his troubles, and complained that though we are told he has learned greater wisdom we are not shown it. E. M. Forster thought the story of Glenallan and his long-lost son formed the main point of interest in the novel apart from the character of Oldbuck, but H. J. C. Grierson preferred Edie Ochiltree. A. N. Wilson thought the whole Glenallan strand unconvincing, its Gothic nature being incompatible with the rest of the novel, while David Daiches believed that it gives “a sense of depth and implication to the action” without altering its essential atmosphere.
