= Petur Alberg =

Faroese violin player and songwriter

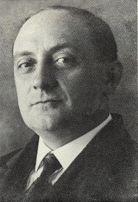
- Born: 15 December 1885; Tórshavn, Faroe Islands
- Died: 1940 (aged 54–55); Faroe Islands
- Occupation: composer
- Known for: composing the Faroese national anthem

Petur Alberg (15 December 1885 – 1940) was a Faroese violin player and songwriter from Tórshavn. He composed the anthem of the Faroes, "Mítt alfagra land", or "Tú alfagra land mítt", as it is usually called.
