= Jonathan Oldbuck =

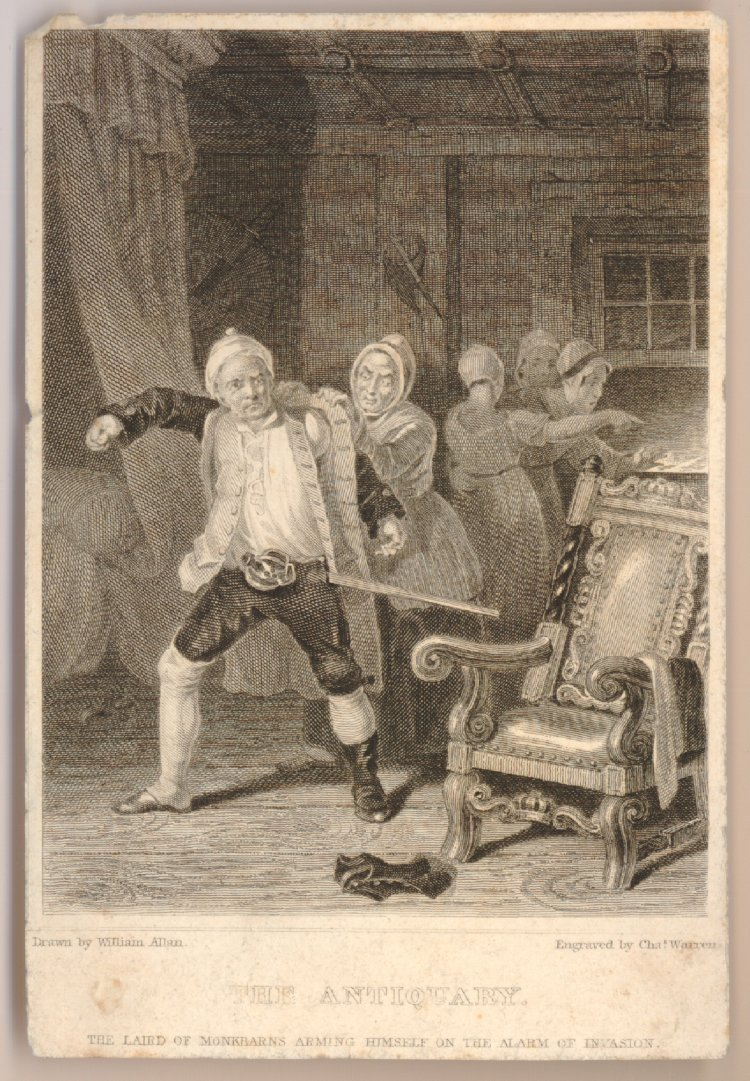
- "The Laird of Monkbarns Arming Himself on the Alarm of Invasion" by William Allan, engraved by Charles Warren
- First appearance: The Antiquary (1816)
- Last appearance: Tales of the Crusaders (1825)
- Created by: Walter Scott

In-universe information
- Aliases: Jonathan Oldenbuck, Jonathan Oldinbuck
- Nickname: Monkbarns
- Occupation: Laird, lawyer, antiquary
- Relatives: Aldobrand Oldenbuck (Great-great-great-grandfather); Griselda Oldbuck (Sister); Maria M'Intyre (Niece); Hector M'Intyre (Nephew)
- Religion: Presbyterian
- Nationality: Scottish

Jonathan Oldbuck is the leading character in Sir Walter Scott's 1816 novel The Antiquary. In accordance with Scottish custom he is often addressed by the name of his house, Monkbarns. He is devoted to the study and collection of old coins, books and archaeological relics, and has a marked tendency to misogyny due to disappointment in an early love affair. His characteristics have been traced back to several men known to Scott, and to the author himself, an enthusiastic antiquary. Many critics have considered him one of Scott's finest creations.

== His role in the novel ==
Jonathan Oldbuck is the laird of Monkbarns, a country house on the north-east coast of Scotland. Returning from a trip to Edinburgh he falls in with a young Englishman calling himself Lovel, befriends him, and spends time showing him the local historical sights, though Oldbuck's antiquarian gullibility is comically exposed by an acquaintance, the beggar Edie Ochiltree. Oldbuck quarrels with an old friend, an antiquarian dilettante called Sir Arthur Wardour, but they are reconciled after Wardour narrowly escapes death by drowning. He proposes that Lovel write a long historical poem to be called The Caledoniad, and offers to write the scholarly notes to it. They are invited on a trip to the ruins of Saint Ruth's Priory, where the party discuss a treasure rumoured to be buried there. When another member of the party, the fraudulent German alchemist Herman Dousterswivel, succeeds in getting money from Wardour to finance a search for the treasure Oldbuck warns his friend against the charlatan. Without Dousterswivel's help Oldbuck and Wardour discover a hoard of silver ingots. Oldbuck begins to find his troubles multiplying. On the one hand his hot-headed young nephew Hector M'Intyre, who has been shot by Lovel in a duel, is convalescing at Monkbarns and upsetting the smooth running of the household; on the other hand one of his tenants, the fisherman Steenie Mucklebackit, is drowned. Oldbuck attends his funeral, and on a later visit to the dead man's father's cottage encounters the Earl of Glenallan, awakening painful memories. We learn that Oldbuck had once loved a certain Eveline Neville, who had preferred to secretly marry Glenallan, but the marriage had ended with the wife's suicide, the husband's nervous breakdown, and the spiriting away of their only son. Now, after many years, Glenallan wants to find this son, and Oldbuck agrees to help him. He also has to help to get the beggar Ochiltree, who has been accused of an assault on Dousterswivel, freed from prison, and to advise the hapless Wardour on how to handle his impending bankruptcy. The novel ends with a rumour of impending French invasion, which rouses Oldbuck and the whole town of Fairport to take up arms and if necessary fight for their country together. This false alarm is suppressed by the arrival of a famous cavalry officer, Major Neville, who proves to be not only Oldbuck's friend Lovel but also Glenallan's son. So the Antiquary can return to his life of contented historical research.

== His character ==
Oldbuck functions in the novel as a comic foil to the down-to-earth realist Ochiltree, the gothically tragic Glenallan, and the absurdly self-important Wardour. The most obvious aspect of his character is an obsessive devotion to the pursuit of antiquarianism. He writes on castrametation, the science of ancient fortification, and contributes papers on learned subjects to journals; he argues heatedly with his friends over the nature of the Pictish language; he buys overpriced land purely for the pleasure of owning the site of a Roman camp and of the battle of Mons Graupius. His devotion to his scholarship, and his celibacy, make him a modern equivalent of the monks of St. Ruth's Priory, as he recognises himself. But this enthusiasm can lead him into self-delusion, as with his supposed Roman camp which was in fact built as a shelter by local peasants only twenty years before, partly because his approach to the past is not that of a scientific historian, deducing hypotheses from solid evidence, but that of an antiquary, forming opinions first and justifying them with whatever evidence comes to hand afterwards. He also has a legal training, and believes strongly in its usefulness in all matters of business, but in the early stages of the novel both his antiquarian and his legal skills tend to be in practice of little use to him. He is, like his author, a Stoic, but this philosophy is compromised by his Scottish materialism. His rejection by Eveline Neville has left him with a marked lack of regard for “womankind”, but has not embittered him to the extent of drying up all capacity for human sympathy. His futility as an agent in human affairs is only ended when he begins to feel for the troubles of others, and to listen and observe rather than acting on preconceived theories. Then, as A. N. Wilson says, “Oldbuck's stature as a man is measured by the depth of his sympathies, by his Christian charity”. Though Oldbuck is in politics a Whig and a supporter of the French Revolution, yet at the novel's end when the Revolution seems to be coming too close to home he finds himself to be a patriot ready to fight for his country.

== The origins of Oldbuck ==
The writer W. S. Crockett considered Jonathan Oldbuck to be more firmly based on real-life models than any other of Scott's characters, Edie Ochiltree alone excepted. Scott himself tells us that the character was loosely based on a friend of his father's, one George Constable, a retired lawyer who lived at a country house called Wallace-Craigie, near Dundee. Scott first got to know him when only six years old, and for the first time learned from Constable about Falstaff, Hotspur and other characters from Shakespeare. Scott's biographer Hesketh Pearson attributes to this the fact that The Antiquary contains more quotations from and allusions to Shakespeare than any other of his novels. The resemblance between the real and fictional characters was detected by a friend of Constable and of Scott's father, George Chalmers, much to Scott's astonishment, since he believed he had erased all such similarities as might be recognized. He claimed that

there is not a single incident in the novel which is borrowed from his real circumstances except the fact that he resided in an old house near a flourishing seaport, and that the Author chanced to witness a scene betwixt him and the female proprietor of a stage coach, very similar to that which commences the history of The Antiquary. An excellent temper, with a slight degree of subacid humour; learning, wit, and drollery, the more piquant that they were a little marked by the peculiarities of an old bachelor; a soundness of thought rendered more forcible by an occasional quaintness of expression, were, the Author avers, the only qualities in which the creature of his imagination resembled his benevolent and excellent old friend.

George Gleig, one of Scott's early biographers, was certain that another model for Oldbuck was a Highlander called John Ramsay of Ochtertyre, whom Scott knew for many years. Ramsay was a keen collector of Roman and prehistoric antiquities, and was an authority on Scottish traditions concerning the Jacobite rebellion of 1745–6. However Ramsay, like Constable, by no means shared Oldbuck's contempt for “womankind”.

W. S. Crockett asserted that another figure behind the fictional Oldbuck was Alexander Gordon (1692?–1755), whose Itinerarium Septentrionale… Containing an Account of all the Monuments of Roman Antiquity [and] of the Danish Invasions on Scotland was much admired in its day, not least by Jonathan Oldbuck himself, who carries a prized copy of it home at the opening of the novel and goes on to quote his opinions approvingly in later chapters.

Scott's son-in-law and biographer J. G. Lockhart suggested that yet another model could be found in the character of John Clerk of Eldin, a naval writer; and certainly an incident in the life of Clerk's grandfather Sir John Clerk, 1st Bt. was the inspiration for an episode in chapter 4 of The Antiquary:

[T]he old Baronet carried some English virtuosos to see a supposed Roman camp; and on his exclaiming at a particular spot, “This I take to have been the Praetorium”, a herdsman, who stood by, answered, “Praetorium here, Praetorium there, I made it wi' a flaughter-spade.”

But he was also sure that Oldbuck's greatest resemblance was to his own author, and this view has been widely accepted by modern critics. Scott's pursuit of antiquities was every bit as enthusiastic as Oldbuck's, and he could easily have said with the laird of Monkbarns “My great-great-great-grandfather – it's a shame to the English language that we have not a less clumsy way of expressing a relationship of which we have occasion to think and speak so frequently.” A particular obsession of Scott's was the tracking down of Border ballads, which he edited in Minstrelsy of the Scottish Border, and likewise Oldbuck was “a diligent collector of these scraps of ancient poetry”. In later years Scott repeatedly compared himself to Oldbuck when discussing his antiquarian pursuits in his letters. The two men were equally capable of being taken in by fraudulent impositions on their credulity, as when Scott accepted the fake ballad “Barthram's Dirge” and a manufactured Latin legend about a spectre knight from his friend Robert Surtees. They were also equally prone to buying land purely for its historical associations, Scott being in the process of completing his acquisition of the entire wide-ranging site of the battle of Melrose while he was writing The Antiquary. Oldbuck's preference for publishing his scholarly papers and the proposed notes for Lovel's Caledoniad anonymously or pseudonymously recall the fact that The Antiquary, like all the earlier Waverley novels, first appeared without Scott's name. Both men were careful in their daily expenditure, yet generous to others. Scott gave to his creation many of his own family circumstances, legal training, and experiences in love, with the young Oldbuck's rejection by Eveline Neville echoing quite closely Scott's own by Williamina Belsches, even to the retreat into antiquarianism as a distraction from his sorrows. John Sutherland has suggested that the name of Oldbuck's house, Monkbarns, is analogous to that of Scott's new home Abbotsford. Scott and his brainchild took opposite sides in politics – Oldbuck being a Whig, Scott a Tory – and many critics have been surprised at the defence of the French Revolution Scott allows Oldbuck to voice, but it has been claimed that Oldbuck's views on this question are identical with those expressed by Scott in his Life of Napoleon Bonaparte, the Revolution being for both of them a historical necessity. A. N. Wilson believed that if Scott had continued to quietly cultivate his friendships and the life of the mind like Oldbuck, rather than indulging a folie de grandeur like Wardour's, he would have died a happier man.

== Later appearances ==
Scott did not wholly put Oldbuck to one side once he had completed the novel. His 1819 work Ivanhoe is prefixed by a “Dedicatory Epistle” from the fictional character Laurence Templeton to his friend Dr. Jonas Dryasdust, mentioned in The Antiquary as a correspondent of Oldbuck's, in which Templeton points out that a historical novel “might not suit the severer genius of our friend Mr. Oldbuck”. The 1825 Tales of the Crusaders has an Introduction describing a meeting between various characters from the Waverley novels, in which Oldbuck acts as Secretary. And when Scott compiled a guidebook to his home, Abbotsford, he used the pseudonym Jonathan Oldbuck, thus pointing up once more the extent to which he recognized himself in that character.

== Critical assessment ==
Contemporary reviews had comparatively little to say about Oldbuck. The British Critic offered the opinion that “If his blunders cause amusement, his learning will afford instruction”. The British Lady's Magazine and John Wilson Croker in the Quarterly Review agreed in thinking him a repetition of a character from an earlier Scott novel, though they differed as to whether this was the Baron of Bradwardine from Waverley or Counsellor Pleydell from Guy Mannering. The Edinburgh Review’s initial impression was that Oldbuck, as an “oddity”, was the great blemish on the novel, but later found that he “is so managed as to turn out both more interesting and more amusing than we had any reason to expect”. Lockhart agreed better with the second thoughts of the Edinburgh reviewer, Francis Jeffrey, than his first, going so far as to say that Scott had “nowhere displayed his highest art, that of skillful contrast, in greater perfection…than the oddities of Jonathan Oldbuck and his circle are relieved, on the one hand by the stately gloom of the Glenallans, on the other by the stern affliction of the poor fisherman”.

20th century critics, just like Francis Jeffrey, have debated how well Scott solved the problem of describing a pedant in a way that would make him more interesting to the reader than he is to his fictional compeers. The biographer Edgar Johnson found his humours entertaining, if “a bit prolonged and overindulged”, but Hesketh Pearson called him “the most entertaining bore in literature; his humour redeems him”. For Charles Harold Herford he was a great creation drawn from the heart of Scottish life. Some critics have found that the charm and the main sentimental interest of The Antiquary lies in the antiquary himself more than in any other character. Robert C. Gordon considered him to be “the most fully and extensively developed character” of Scott's first three novels. Virginia Woolf found that, like Shakespeare's and Jane Austen's characters, he is different every time one reads the novel. V. S. Pritchett declared that Oldbuck “stands solidly and aglow beside all the well-found comics of our literature”. Andrew Lang also had no doubts, calling him “perennially delightful”, and the scholar Aubrey Bell cited Oldbuck in support of his and Georg Brandes' view that Scott was one of the finest drawers of character ever to have lived.
