= Edie Ochiltree =

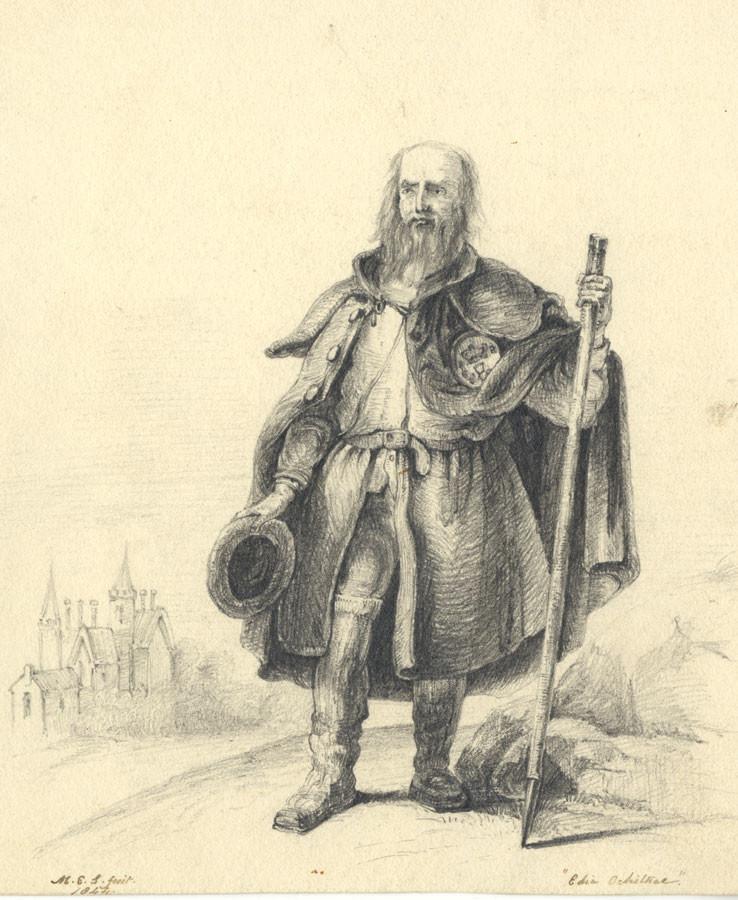
- Edie Ochiltree in an 1844 graphite drawing by Mary E. Sealy
- First appearance: The Antiquary (1816)
- Created by: Walter Scott

In-universe information
- Gender: Male
- Title: Royal Bedesman
- Occupation: Beggar
- Religion: Presbyterian
- Nationality: Scottish

Edie Ochiltree is a fictional character in Sir Walter Scott's 1816 novel The Antiquary, a licensed beggar of the legally protected class known as Blue-gowns or bedesmen, who follows a regular beat around the fictional Scottish town of Fairport. Scott based his character on Andrew Gemmels, a real beggar he had known in his childhood. Along with Jonathan Oldbuck, the novel's title-character, Ochiltree is widely seen as one of Scott's finest creations.

== His character ==
Jonathan Oldbuck, the antiquary of the novel's title, says that Ochiltree "has been soldier, ballad-singer, travelling tinker, and is now a beggar…a sort of privileged nuisance – one of the last specimens of the old-fashioned Scottish mendicant, who kept his rounds within a particular space, and was the news-carrier, the minstrel, and sometimes the historian of the district". Ochiltree's great love and knowledge of the old ballads and traditions echoes Oldbuck's more scholarly antiquarian lore. They have a mutual respect and liking for each other, and between them they solve the other characters' problems and bring the novel to a happy resolution, but on the way they sometimes clash comically, Oldbuck's antiquarian fantasy and self-delusion being punctured by Ochiltree's realism and good sense. Both characters are presented as being sticklers for exactness, Ochiltree being remarkable for the accuracy of the local news he brings and for his insistence on old traditions being remembered correctly. In the first half of the novel the two are differentiated by Ochiltree's greater practical effectiveness in the help he brings to others. He could be described as a Cynic in the tradition of Diogenes, and he is at odds with modern commercial society in his traditional reliance on the support of the community at large rather than on any single patron. His overall function in the Fairport community is to bind it together.

== The originals of Ochiltree ==
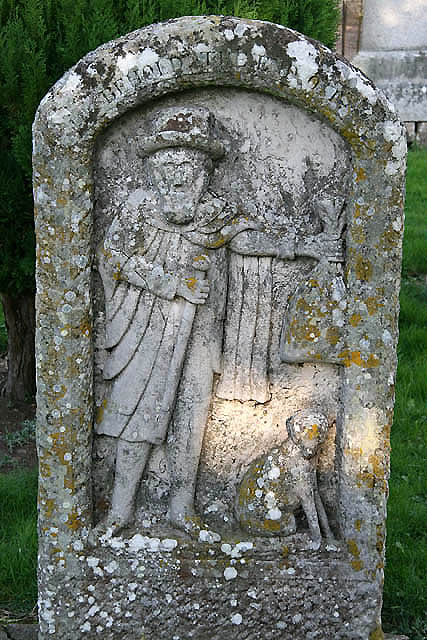
The gravestone of Andrew Gemmels

The writer W. S. Crockett considered Edie Ochiltree to be more firmly based on a real-life model than any other of Scott's characters, Jonathan Oldbuck alone excepted. His original was one Andrew Gemmels, a beggar whom Scott, then a boy in Kelso, had often met. Gemmels came from the parish of Old Cumnock in Ayrshire, and he was, like Ochiltree, an army veteran who had fought at the battle of Fontenoy. Scott described him in his introduction to the 1829 edition of The Antiquary as "a remarkably fine old figure, very tall, and maintaining a soldierlike or military manner and address. His features were intelligent, with a powerful expression of sarcasm…It was some fear of Andrew's satire, as much as a feeling of kindness or charity, which secured him the general good reception which he enjoyed everywhere." He prospered better than most beggars, and died, by his own reckoning, at the age of 105, leaving a small fortune to a nephew.

Scott's son-in-law and biographer J. G. Lockhart pointed out another model for Ochiltree in an anecdote concerning Sir John Clerk, 1st Bt., which was certainly the inspiration for an episode in chapter 4 of The Antiquary:

[T]he old Baronet carried some English Virtuosos to see a supposed Roman camp; and on his exclaiming at a particular spot, "This I take to have been the Praetorium", a herdsman, who stood by, answered, "Praetorium here, Praetorium there, I made it wi' a flaughter-spade."

Some critics have claimed that Scott's own character can be discerned in Ochiltree, particularly in the capacity to stoically accept personal misfortunes which supported Scott in his later years.

== Critical assessment ==
At least five reviews of The Antiquary, in the Quarterly Review, the Edinburgh Review, the Monthly Review, the Critical Review, and the British Lady's Magazine, agreed in considering Ochiltree a male version of Scott's eldritch gypsy Meg Merrilies in his previous novel Guy Mannering. The Quarterly 's reviewer, John Wilson Croker, thought the imitation improved on the original, while the Monthly thought him unforgettable and sometimes sublime, but Francis Jeffrey in the Edinburgh could give him only qualified approval. The Augustan Review could not accept the idea of a mere beggar expressing moral eloquence and poetic feeling, and it detected in this the influence of Wordsworth. William H. Prescott in the North American Review believed that such characters as Edie Ochiltree showed Scott to have a "worldly, good-natured shrewdness" surpassing that of Shakespeare himself. Later in the century a critic in the London Quarterly thought he ranked among "the most complete and remarkable characters created by Scott or any other man", and this opinion was echoed by many 20th-century commentators. Andrew Lang considered the treatment of the character of Ochiltree was an example of Scott's art at its very best. For Charles Harold Herford he was a great creation drawn from the heart of Scottish life. The scholar Aubrey Bell cited Ochiltree in support of his and Georg Brandes' view that Scott was one of the finest drawers of character ever to have lived. John Sutherland was unconvinced by Ochiltree's readiness to put the welfare of his betters before his own, and interpreted this as a symptom of Scott's nostalgia for the national solidarity of Britain in the 1790s, when men of all classes felt threatened by Revolutionary France. Scott's biographer Edgar Johnson acknowledged that some readers find the scenes between Ochiltree and the fraudster Herman Dousterswivel too redolent of low comedy. He himself doubted if Ochiltree's eloquence was entirely realistic in a beggar, and he also noted his tendency to be conveniently present whenever the plot needs to be moved forward. The academic Robin Mayhead however disagreed, arguing that The Antiquary does not have the conventions of the realist school; for him Ochiltree functions as an embodiment of dependability, necessary to offset the faults and fallibilities of other characters in the novel. This, rather than the attraction of Ochiltree's "racy vernacular", led Mayhead to declare himself as great an admirer as any of this character. A. N. Wilson wrote about Ochiltree's "strangely moving (though so stagey) wisdom". John Buchan noted that he was depicted with "minute realism" as a typical Scottish beggar, and yet was sometimes able "to speak words which, though wholly in character, are yet part of the world's poetry". He approvingly quoted another critic as saying that Ochiltree is the most Shakespearean figure outside Shakespeare. Hesketh Pearson also compared Ochiltree with Shakespeare's creations, and found him more realistic than any of them, and more humorous than all but Falstaff. He was, for Pearson, Scott's first great character. Henry A. Beers likewise numbered him among Scott's greatest creations, one of those who "brought into play his knowledge of men, his humour, observation of life, and insight into Scotch human nature".

== Legacy ==
When the Scott Monument was erected in Edinburgh in the 1840s, its many figurative statues included one of Edie Ochiltree, executed by George Anderson Lawson. It shows Ochiltree with a straggly beard, a broad-brimmed hat, and a badge on his shoulder identifying him as a licensed beggar.

The GCR Class 11F steam locomotive Edie Ochiltree was built for the London and North Eastern Railway in September 1924, and remained in service on the LNER and on its successor British Railways until August 1959.
