= Charlie Butler-Henderson =

British racing driver (born 1978)

Charlie Guy Butler-Henderson (born 23 November 1978) is a British auto racing driver who now works as a racing instructor and presenter. He was the champion of the Mini Challenge UK in 2015. He is the younger brother of racing driver and Fifth Gear presenter Vicki Butler-Henderson.

== Racing career ==
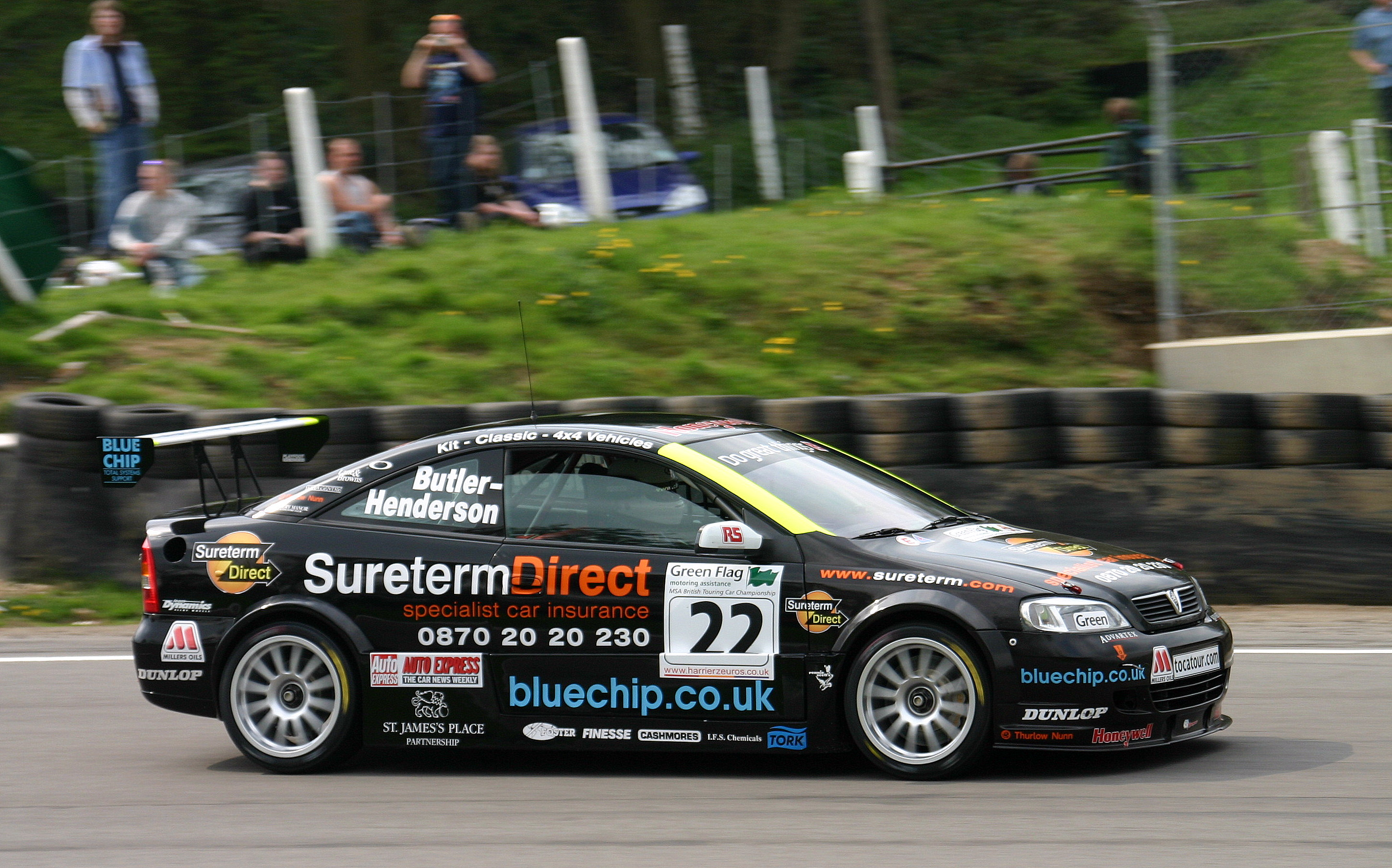
Butler-Henderson driving the GA Motorsport-entered Vauxhall Astra Coupé at Brands Hatch during the 2004 British Touring Car Championship season.

Part of a family with strong ties to motor sport, including a father who was a karting champion, Butler-Henderson started in motorsports winning several titles in karting. He moved up to single-seat racing in the 1995 Formula Vauxhall Junior Championship.

After time as a test driver and doing some instructing, Butler-Henderson was in the Marcos Mantis Challenge, finishing the season in second. In 2000, he progressed to the British GT championship driving a Marcos LM 600 for the Ohana Team. For 2001, he also drove in the British and French GTO championships. In 2002, he drove in the British GT for TFM-GT Team. In 2003 he competed in the Renault Clio Cup, finishing twelfth in points for Xcel Motorsport.

For 2004, Butler-Henderson got a drive in the British Touring Car Championship. He drove in half a season for the Gary Ayles-run Team Sureterm, in a Vauxhall Astra Coupe. the year was not a particularly successful one, finishing tenth in the independents cup, and twenty-second overall. He then left racing to concentrate on instructing.

In 2009 and 2010, Butler-Henderson had two one-off appearances in the Ginetta G50 Cup with Speedworks Motorsport, finishing three out of five races he started.

For 2010, Butler-Henderson was signed by Advent Motor Sport to drive in the Trofeo Abarth 500 Great Britain. He scored seven podiums including a second at Round 1 at Oulton Park and finished 3rd in the championship.

In 2015, Butler-Henderson won the UK Mini Challenge championship and was a runner up in 2016.

== Racing record ==
=== Complete British Touring Car Championship results ===
(key) (Races in bold indicate pole position – 1 point awarded in first race) (Races in italics indicate fastest lap – 1 point awarded all races) (* signifies that driver lead race for at least one lap – 1 point awarded all races)

Year	Team	Car	1	2	3	4	5	6	7	8	9	10	11	12	13	14	15	16	17	18	19	20	21	22	23	24	25	26	27	28	29	30	DC	Pts
2004	Team Sureterm GA Motorsports	Vauxhall Astra Coupé	THR; 1; 12	THR; 2; 11	THR; 3 Ret	BRH; 1; 11	BRH; 2 Ret	BRH; 3; 11	SIL; 1 Ret	SIL; 2 Ret	SIL; 3; 13	OUL; 1 Ret	OUL; 2; 10	OUL; 3 Ret	MON; 1	MON; 2	MON; 3	CRO; 1 Ret	CRO; 2; 15	CRO; 3 Ret	KNO; 1	KNO; 2	KNO; 3	BRH; 1	BRH; 2	BRH; 3	SNE; 1	SNE; 2	SNE; 3	DON; 1	DON; 2	DON; 3	21st	1
