= Sarpen =

Norwegian newspaper

Sarpen was a Norwegian newspaper, published in Sarpsborg in Østfold county between 1854 and 1991.

== History and profile ==
Sarpen was started as Dagbladet Sarpen in 1854, and eventually became affiliated with the Conservative Party, which was founded in 1884. Struggling in the competition with Sarpsborg Arbeiderblad, in 1974 Sarpen was brought under the wings of fellow conservative newspaper Fredriksstad Blad from the neighboring city Fredrikstad. However, this cooperation did not help. In 1983 it had a circulation of 2,525, about six times less than the circulation of Sarpsborg Arbeiderblad. Sarpen went defunct in 1991.
