= List of defunct newspapers of Norway =

This is a list of defunct newspapers of Norway.

== Agder ==
Newspaper	Category	Founded	Closed	Notes	Political
Agder tidend		1919	1985		
Allemansblad		1873	1873		
Andvake		1884	1887		
Christianssands Adresse-Contors Efterretninger		1790	1896		
Kristiansands Stiftsavis og Adressekontors-Efterretninger		1790	1896		
Christiansandske ugeblade		1780	1788		
Christianssandsposten		1839	1847		
Christianssands Tidende		1883	1973		
Correspondenten(Tvedestrand)		1899	1900		
Flekkefjords budstikke		1874	1890		
Flekkefjordsposten		1893	1973		
Folketanken (Risør)		1887	1945		
Folketidende	national	1865	1879		Classical liberal
Folkets Tidende		1891	1907		
Andvake		1884/1945	1904/1951		
Grømstad-Posten		1884/1945	1904/1951		
Grømstadposten		1884/1945	1904/1951		
Lillesands Tidende		1882	1884		
Lillesands Tilskuer		1886	1918		
Lister		1878	1934		
Lister og Mandals Amtstidende		1909	1919		
Mandalsbladet	local	1899	1901		
Nedenæs Amtstidende		1867	1924		
Politisk folkeblad for alle stænder		1870	1871		
Samleren		1909	1960		
Søndenfjeldske avis		1892	1903		
Sørlandets Social-Demokrat		1907	1990		
Tvedestrand og Omegns Avis		1902	1948		
Tvedestrands Tidende		1890	1890		
Vestlandske Tidende		1832	1973		

== Akershus ==
Newspaper	Category	Founded	Closed	Notes	Political
Aker og Lørenskog avis		1926	1927		
Akershus (avis)		1886	1966		
Akershus Arbeiderblad		1922	1990		Labour
Akershus Folkeblad (Dal: 1932-1935)		1932	1935		Free minded liberal party
Akershus Folkeblad (Drøbak: 1924)		1924	1924		Labour
Akershus Social-Demokrat		1913	1990		Labour
Akershus Arbeiderblad		1913	1990		Labour
Akershus-Budstikken		1896	1902		Liberal
Akershusposten(Lillestrøm: 1905-1919)		1905	1919		Liberal
Bærums Blad		1909	1932		Liberal-conservative
Drøbak dagblad					
Eidsiva		1909	1936		Conservative Free minded liberal party
Eidsvoll Arbeiderblad		1927	1951		Labour
Follo (Ski: 1929-1940)		1929	1940		Labour
Follo Arbeiderblad		1922	1924		Labour and later Communist
Follo Socialdemokrat		1919	1922		Labour
Hurumposten	local	1980	1990s		
Rigsforsamlings-Tidende		1814	1814		
Romerike (Avis)		1913	1966		Labour Democrats and Liberal Party
Romeriksposten (Lillestrøm: 1931-42)		1931	1942		Liberal

== Innlandet ==
Newspaper	Category	Founded	Closed	Notes	Political
Arbeiderbladet (Gjøvik)		1889	1891		
Bonden (Lillehammer: 1897)					
Demokraten (Hamar:1909-22)					
Framgang					
Gjøviks Blad (1884-1920)					
Glomdalens Arbeiderblad					
Glomdalens Tidende					
Glommendalen					
Gudbrandsdalens Folkeblad (Gjøvik: 1909-1930)					
Gudbrandsdalens Arbeiderblad					
Gudbrandsdalens blad					
Gudbrandsdølen					
Hamar Dagblad					
Hamar Stiftstidende (1866-1916)					
Hamar Stiftstidende (1929-1959)					
Hamar Stiftstidende (1929-1971)					
Hamar Stiftstidende og Oplandenes Avis					
Hamars Budstikke					
Hedemarkens Amtstidende					
Hedemarkingen					
Indlandsposten					
Kristians Amtstidende (Gjøvik: 1861-1883)					
Laagen		1923	1945		
Lillehammer Tilskuer		1841	1990		
Nes og Helgøya					
Ny Dag (Gjøvik: 1913-1924)					
Ny Dag (Kongsvinger: 1937)					
Nye Stiftstidende					
Oplandenes Avis		1872	1916		
Oplands-Posten (Hamar: 1852-1856)					
Oplands-Tidende					
Oplandsposten (Gjøvik: 1930-31, 1945)					
Oplandsposten (Randsfjord: 1892-1893)					
Oplendingen					
Oplændingen (Gjøvik: 1893-1904)					
Ringebo Tidende					
Samhold (Gjøvik)					
Samhold (Gjøvik: 1885-1920)					
Samhold-Velgeren					
Solungen					
Solørposten					
Torpingen					
Vaalebro Avis					
Valdres Blad (Aurdal: 1928-1929)					
Valdres tidende (Aurdal: 1926-1927)					
Velgeren					
Vestopland					
Vestoplændingen					
Østerdal arbeiderblad					
Østerdal Folkeblad					
Østerdalen					
Østerdalens Arbeiderblad					
Østerdalens Avis (Elverum: 1911-1929)					
Østerdølen (Tynset: 1904-1971)					

== Møre og Romsdal ==
Newspaper	Category	Founded	Closed	Notes	Political
Aalesunds Handels- og Søfartstidende		1856	1904		
Aalesunds Tidende (1872-1876)					
Aalesunds blad		1871	1895		
Christianssunds Adresseavis		1871	1873		
Christiansunds Dagblad (Kristiansund: 1894-1896)					
Express		1915			
Folkebladet (Kristiansund: 1930-1935)					
Folkebladet (Kristiansund: 1930-35)					
Framstig (Volda: 1910-1911)					
Framstig (Volda: 1913-1919)					
Fylket (I)					
Heimhug (Ørsta: 1898-1901)					
Jordbrukeren					
Kristiansundsposten (Kristiansund: 1882-1911)					
Kristiansundsposten (Kristiansund: 1940)					
Landboe-Avisen					
Molde Annonceblad (Molde: 1893-1928)					
Møre Arbeiderblad (Ålesund: 1923-1931)					
Møre Bygdeblad					
Møre Social-Demokrat					
Møre Tidend (Ålesund: 1917-1927)					
Møre Tidende (Kristiansund: 1898-1903)					
Møringen (Ekset: 1869-1873)					
Nordmør (Kristiansund: 1903-1921)					
Nordmør (Kristiansund: 1933-1940)					
Nordmøringen					
Nordmøringen (Sunndalsøra: 1915-1959)					
Postbudet					
Rauma Tidende					
Romsdal (Åndalsnes: 1912-1927)					
Romsdal Folkeblad					
Romsdals Amtstidende					
Romsdals Tidende					
Romsdalsposten					
Sunnmøre (Volda: 1921-1926)					
Sunnmøre Arbeideravis					
Sunnmøre tidend					
Sunnmøringen (Sykkylven)					
Søndmøre Avis					
Søndmøre Folkeblad					
Søndmøre folketidende					
Søndmørsposten					
Ørsta Avis					
Øyavis					

== Nordland ==
Newspaper	Category	Founded	Closed	Notes	Political
Andøya Avis		1925	1982		
Bodø Tidende		1881	1937		
Friheten (Svolvær)					
Helgeland		1910	1957		
Helgelands Tidende					
Lofot-Posten (Kabelvåg: 1885)					
Lofot-Tidende (Vestvågøy: 1987-)					
Lofoten (Kabelvåg: 1895-1897)					
Lofoten Folkeblad					
Lofotens Tidende					
Lofotposten (Svolvær: 1896-)					
Narvik Tidende					
Nordland					
Nordland Arbeiderblad					
Nordlands Amtstidende		1862	2002		Liberal
Nordlandsposten		1862	2002		Liberal
Nordlands Avis		1893	1978		
Nordlands Bondebladet (Hemnesberget 1921-1922)					
Nordlands Folkeblad		1880	1955		
Nordlands Nytt					
Saltens fremtid		1910	2002		
Nordlands Social-Demokrat		1910	2002		
Nordlands framtid		1910	2002		
Nordlandskysten					
Nordlendingen					
Ofoten Folkeblad		1922	1956		
Ofotens Tidende		1899	2000		
Ranens Folkeblad (Mo i Rana: 1913-1918)					
Ranens Folkeblad (Mo i Rana: 1921-1922)					
Ranens Tidende					
Salten					
Saltværingen (Fauske: 1903)					
Saltværingen (Fauske: 1907-1913)					

== Oslo ==
Newspaper	Category	Founded	Closed	Notes	Political
ABC (avis)	national	1927	1940		Fatherlandsparty
Adressebladet		1855	1892		
Aftenbladet		1855	1881		
Aftenposten: Ukens nytt		1889	1989		
Aftenpostens Landbrugstidende					
Akershus Folkeblad		1903	1912		
Akershusposten	local	1920	1943		
Alarm (Norwegian Newspaper)		1919	1940		Syndicalist
Arbeider-Politikken		1920	1927		Social democrats
Arbeiderbladet : Fram		1930			Labour
Arbeideren (Oslo: 1884-90)		1884	1890		Labour
Arbeideren		1929-	1940		Communist
Arbeiderforeningernes Blad					
Arbeideridrett					
Austland		1922	1965	nynorsk	
		1893	1929		
Budstikken					
Budstikken (Oslo: 1881-87)		1881	1887		
Christiania Adresse-Tidende		1842	1857		
Christiania Dagblad					
Christiania Intelligentssedler					
Christiania Nyheds- og Avertissementsblad					
Christiania-Posten					
Christianias Almindelige Adresse-Tidende					
Dag i Norden					
Dagbladet (Oslo: 1869-)					
Dagbladet Oslo: 1863					
Dagbladet Oslo: 1869					
Dagen (Oslo)					
Dagens Nytt					
Demokraten (Oslo: 1883-84)					
Den 17de mai					
Den Constitutionelle					
Den Norske Rigstidende					
Den nye social-demokraten					
Det Norske Nationalblad					
Dølen					
Eidsvold (Oslo: 1893-1901)					
Folkets Vel (Oslo: 1892-1900)					
For fattig og rik (Oslo)					
Forposten					
Forstadsposten					
Fremad (Oslo: 1894-1900)					
Fædrelandet					
Fædrelandet : den norske arbeider (Oslo: 1872-1875)					
Gaa Paa (Oslo: 1895-1899)					
Handels- og Søfartstidende					
Herredsposten				Free-minded Liberal Party	
Idrettsliv					
Jernbaneavisen					
Jernbanemanden					
Kristianiaposten (Oslo: 1880)					
Kristianiaposten (Oslo: 1885-1896)					
Kysten					
Landmandsposten					
Landsbladet (Oslo)					
Laurdagskvelden (Oslo: 1898-1901)					
Menigmands Blad					
Morgengryet (Oslo: 1883-1893)					
Morgenposten					
Nasjonal Samling					
Nationalbladet (Oslo: 1852)					
Nationalbladet (Oslo: 1895-1907)					
Nationaltidende (Oslo: 1888-1890)					
Nordmanden (Oslo: 1882-1883)					
Nordmanden (Oslo: 1892-1901)					
Nordmannen (Oslo: 1888-1891)					
Nordstrand-Østre Aker Blad					
Nordstrands Avis					
Norge (Oslo: 1877-1880)					
Norge (Oslo: 1905)					
Norges Fremtid					
Norges Handels og Sjøfartstidende					
Norges Kommunistblad					
Norges Kvinder					
Norges Sjøfartstidende					
Norsk Handels og Søfartstidende					
Norsk Handels-Tidende (Oslo: 1825-47)					
Norsk Handelstidende (Oslo: 1865-67)					
Norsk Kunngjørelsestidende					
Norske Intelligenssedler					
Patrouillen					
Politiken					
Republiken					
Samfundet (Oslo: 1880-1883)					
Solidaritet (Oslo: 1918-1919)					
Statsborgeren					
Telegrafen (Oslo: 1883-1886)					
Tiden (Oslo: 1808-1811, 1813-1814)					
Tiden Oslo: 1850)					
Tidens Krav (Oslo: 1889-1898)					
Tidens Tegn					
Ullern Avis (Oslo: 1933-2008)					
Utstillingsavisen					
VG (1868-1923)					
Vestlandsposten : Folkets Avis (Oslo: 1887-1889)					
Vort Arbeide (Oslo: 1884-85)					
Vort Arbeide (Oslo: 1907-1917)					
Vort Land (Oslo: 1890-1918)					
Vort Vel					
Ørebladet					

== Rogaland ==
Newspaper	Category	Founded	Closed	Notes
1ste Mai		1899	2024	
Rogalands Avis		1899	2024	
Bygdaposten for Hjelmeland		1973	2009	
Egersundsposten		1865	1940	
Folket		1919	2006	
Haugaland Arbeiderblad		1907	1955	
Haugesunderen		1884	1991	
Haugesunds Dagblad		1912	1972	
Heimhug (Time: 1872)		1872	1872	
Karmsund		1997	2015	
Karmsundposten		1861	1915	
Kopervik Tidende		1912	1931	
Norge (III)		1880	1880	
Rogaland (Stavanger: 1907-1919)		1907	1919	
Rogaland (Stavanger: 1925-1988)		1925	1988	
Rogalands Arbeiderblad		1926	1927	
Ryfylke-Posten		1919	1922	
Rygja Tidend		1908	1918	nynorsk
Sandnes og Jærens Avis		1932	1940	
Sandnæs-posten		1891	1894	
Stavanger Adresseavis		1833	1906	
Stavanger Amtstidende og Adresseavis		1833	1906	
Stavanger Avis		1889	1911	
Stavanger Socialdemokrat		1921	1927	
Stavanger annonce-tidende		1893	1894	
Stavangeren (Stavanger: 1852-1899)		1852	1899	
Stavangeren (Stavanger: 1916-1943, 1945-1964)		1916	1964	
Vestlands-Posten		1878	1916	

== Telemark ==
Newspaper	Category	Founded	Closed	Notes
Adressetidende for Brevig, Stathelle, Langesund, Bamble og Eidanger		1849	1898	
Bratsberg Amtstidende (Skien: 1840-42)				
Bratsberg Amtstidende (Skien: 1884-1901)				
Bratsberg-Amts Correspondent (Skien: 1844-1846)				
Bratsberg-Demokraten		1908	1929	
Breviks Avis		1878	1881	
Breviks Dagblad		1924	1954	
Breviksposten		1869	1869	
Bygdefolket (Porsgrunn: 1932-35)				
Correspondenten (Skien)				
Drangedal Blad		1991	1998	
Fedraheimen		1877	1891	
Folkebladet (Notodden: 1927)				
Folkerøsten (Skien: 1899-1911)				
Fremskridt (Skien: 1885-1931)				
Fritt Arbeid				
Fylkesavisen		1942	1945	
Grenmar		1878	1931	
Iporsgrunn.no				
Kragerø Blad (Kragerø: 1874-1882)				
Kragerø Blad (Kragerø: 1895-1997)				
Kragerø Tidende				
Kragerøavisa		2003	2008	
Langesund (Langesund: 1950-1969)				
Langesunds Avis		1897	1897	
Langesunds Blad (1882-1883)				
Langesunds Blad (1916-1950)				
Langesundsposten		1907	1911	
Lifjell		1954		
Midt-Telemark		1972	1974	
Norig				
Posten (Skien: 1888-1893)				
Rjukan		1911	1915	
Rjukan Dagblad		1919	1967	
Skagerak				
Skiens Dagblad				
Skiensposten (Skien: 1842-1843)				
Skiensposten (Skien: 1864-1884)				
Skiensposten (Skien: 1897)				
Skotfos Avis (Skotfoss: 1901-1930)				
Teledølen		1905	1973	
Telemark Social-Demokrat		1922	1926	
Telemark tidend		1945		
Telemarkingen		1975	1985	
Telemarksposten (Notodden: 1920-1924)				
Telemarksposten (Skien: 1888-1890)				
Ulefoss Avis (Ulefoss: 1940-1942)				
Ulefoss Avis (Ulefoss: 1947-1950)				
Ulefoss Avis (Ulefoss: 1952-1970)				

== Troms ==
Newspaper	Category	Founded	Closed	Notes
Assu				
Avisen (Harstad)		1890	1890	
Bladet Harstad		1996	2000	
Deutsche Polarzeitung		1941	1945	
Finmarkens og Nordlandenes Amtstidende				
Folkets Krav (Tromsø: 1913-1916)				
Folkeviljen		1911	1956	
Haalogaland				
Hålogaland Avis				
Lauvsprett				
Lenvikens Avis				
Lyngens Nyheder				
Nord-Norges Bondeblad				
Nord-Troms Avis				
Nordposten				
Polar-Kurier				
Senjens Blad (Finnsnes: 1907-1921)				
Senjens Blad (Finnsnes: 1935-1970)				
Senjens Folkeblad				
Skjervø Tidende				
Tromsø Amts Folkeblad				
Tromsø Amtstidende				
Tromsø Stiftstidende				
Tromsø-Tidende (Tromsø: 1838-1857)				
Tromsøposten				

== Finnmark ==
Newspaper	Category	Founded	Closed	Notes
Altafjord				
Finmarkens Amtstidende (Vadsø: 1871-1944)				
Finnmark Folkeblad (Hammerfest: 1942-45)				
Finnmark Folkeblad (Vadsø: 1923-29)				
Finnmark fremtid				
Finnmark tidende				
Finnmarknytt				
Folkets Frihet				
Min Aigi				
Nordkapp				
Røsten				
Sami Aigi				
Sydvaranger				
Vadsø Arbeiderblad				
Varangeren				
Vardø Tidende (Vardø: 1883-1885)				
Vardø-Posten				
Vardø-Tidende (Vardø: 1924-1940)				
Vestfinmarken				
Østfinmarkens Folkeblad				

== Trøndelag ==
Newspaper	Category	Founded	Closed	Notes
Arbeider-Avisa				
Breidablik				
Byavisa Trondheim				
Bygdenes By		1955	1959	
Dagsavisa (Trondheim)		1945	1954	
Dagsposten (Trondheim)		1877	1945	
Dagsposten : Trønderen				
Dagsposten : billednummer				
Den Frimodige				
Dovre				
Fellesbladet Nordtrønderen og Namdalen				
Fjeldposten				
Fjellposten (Svorkmo)		1906	1918	
Folketidende (Trondheim)		1891	1922	
Folketidende : landsudgaven (Trondheim)		1891	1921	
Fosens Blad				
Framsteg (Namsos)		1898	1898	
Framsteg		1906	1908	
Gaulardølen				
Gauldalsposten (Røros)		1963	1986	
Gauldølen (I) (Orkdal)		1906	1909	
Helgelænderen (Namsos)		1872	1874	
Hermod				
Homla (Trondheim)		1898	1899	
Indhereds Tidende		1888		
Indherreds-Posten		1863	1929	
Indtrønderen		1883	1896	
Innherreds Folkeblad og Verdalingen		1952	2015	
Inntrøndelagen		1897	1940	Originally Mjølner
Indtrøndelagens Socialdemokrat		1912	1923	
Levanger-Avisa		1848	2015	
Lokalavisa Verran-Namdalseid		2009	2017	
Malvik-Avisa				
Malvik-bladet				
Melhusbladet				
Namdalen				
Namdalens Blad (Namsos)		1889	1919	
Namdalens Folkeblad				
Nasjonalbladet (Trondheim)		1922	1924	
Nidaros				
Nidaros: Trøndelagen (Trondheim)		1902	1941	
Nord-Trøndelag				Originally Indherred
Nord-Trøndelag og Nordenfjeldsk Tidende				
Nordenfjeldsk Tidende				
Nordlyset				
Nordre Trondhjems Amtstidende				
Nordtrønderen				
Nordtrønderen og Namdalen				
Ny Tid (Trondheim)				
Olsok (Trondheim)		1915	1921	
Opdalingen				
Orkdølen				
Orkmannen				
Sambygdingen (II)				
Selbyggen				
Spegjelen				
Stenkjær Avis		1894	1909	
Stjørdalens blad				
Stjørdalingen				
Stjørna Blad				
Sverre				
Søndre Trondhjems Amtstidende				
Throndhjems Aftenblad				
Throndhjems Stiftsavis				
Thrønderen				
Tiden (Trondheim)		1885	1888	
Trondheimsavisa				
Trondhjems Folkeblad				
Trondhjems Løverdagsaften				
Trondhjems Stiftstidende				
Trondhjemske Tidender				
Trøndelag Social-Demokrat (Trondheim)		1921	1927	
Trøndelagens Avis (Trondheim)		1901	1919	
Verdalingen (Verdal)		1945	1952	
Værdalens Blad				

== Østfold ==
Newspaper	Category	Founded	Closed	Notes
Aalesunds Socialdemokrat	regional	1908	1910	See newspapers of Sunnmøre.
Arbeider-Avisa	national	1924	1996	
Arbeideren	national	1909	1929	
Arbeidernes blad	regional	1898	1898	See newspapers of Sunnmøre.
Bergens Adressecontoirs Efterretninger	regional	1765	1889	
Bergens Aftenblad	regional	1880	1942	
Bergens Social-Demokrat	regional	1922	1927	
Bergens Stiftstidende	regional	1840	1855	
Bergensposten	regional	1854	1893	
Buskerud Blad	regional	1832	1961	
Demokraten	regional	1906	2019	
Deutsche Zeitung in Norwegen	national	1940	1944	Exclusive to the German occupation of Norway.
Egersundsposten	regional	1865	1940	
Flekkefjords Budstikke	regional	1874	1890	
Folketanken	regional	1888	1945	
Folketidende	regional	1865	1879	
Folkets Framtid	regional	1947	2005	
Follo	regional	1929	1957	
Fosna-Arbeideren	regional	1926	1929	
Fronten	regional	1932	1940	
Grømstad-Posten	regional	1884	1951	
Hamar Dagblad	regional	1971	2022	
Hardanger Arbeiderblad	regional	1919	1949	
Haugesunds Social-Demokrat	regional	1921	1927	
Impressionisten	national	1886	1890	
Karmøens Tidende	regional	1904	1916	
Karmøy-Posten	regional	1911	1939	
Karmsundsposten	regional	1861	1915	
Klassekampen	regional	1909	1940	
Kopervik Tidende	regional	1912	1931	
Kringsjaa	regional	1893	1910	
Kristiansands Stiftsavis og Adressekontors-Efterretninger	regional	1790	1896	
Levanger-Avisa	regional	1848	2015	
Lillesands Tidende	regional	1886	1918	
Lister	regional	1878	1934	
Lister og Mandals Amtstidende	regional	1909	1919	
Lokalposten	regional	1930	1941	
Magazinet	national	1919	2008	
Moss Arbeiderblad	regional	1920	1927	
Moss Dagblad	regional	1912	2009	
Muitalægje	regional	1873	1875	
Nedenes Amts Landbotidende	regional	1879	1903	
Norges Kommunistblad	national	1923	1929	
Norsk Landboeblad	national	1809	1817	
Norsk-Tysk Tidsskrift	national	1942	1945	
NS Månedshefte	regional	1941	1945	
Nybrott	regional	1904	1907	See newspapers of Sunnmøre.
Ny Tid	national	1953	2011	
Odda Nyhetsblad	regional	1925	1946	
Orientering	regional	1952	1975	
Østfold-Posten	regional	1917	1990	
Øvre Smaalenene	regional	1902	2003	
Rogaland	regional	1905	1919	
Rogalands Avis	regional	1899	2024	
Saǥai Muittalægje	regional	1904	1911	
Samleren	regional	1909	1960	
Sarpen	regional	1854	1991	
Skiens Ugeblad	regional	1830	1885	
Skiensposten	regional	1864	1884	
Solungen	regional	1904	1914	
Søndenfjeldske Avis	regional	1892	1903	
Sportsmanden	regional	1913	1933	
Stavanger Avis	regional	1888	1911	
Stavanger Socialdemokrat	regional	1921	1927	
Trondheims-Pressen	regional	1945	1945	
Tvedestrand og Omegns Avis	regional	1902	1948	
Verdens Gang	national	1868	1923	
Vestkysten	regional	1987	1987	
Vestlands-Posten	regional	1878	1916	

== Gallery ==
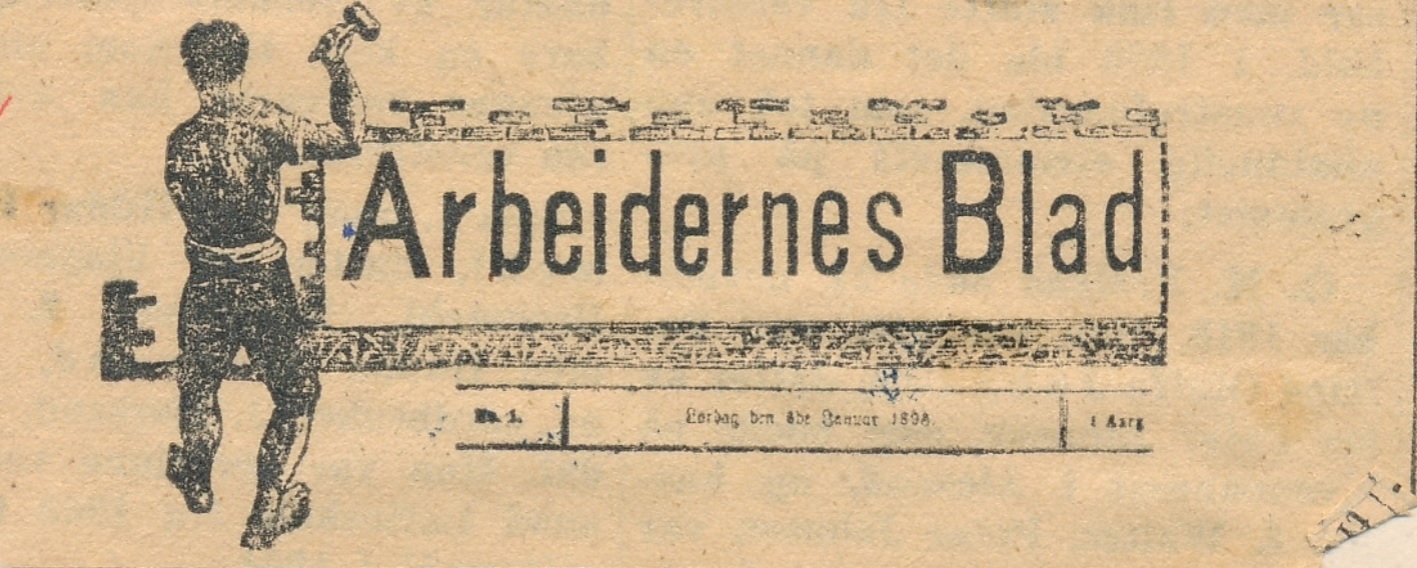
Arbeideneres blad nameplate

== See also ==
- List of newspapers in Norway
