= List of newspapers named Avis =

Avis (Danish/Norwegian for newspaper) is part of the name of the following newspapers:

== Norway ==
- Aalesunds Avis, a former newspaper, published in Ålesund
- Ås Avis, a weekly newspaper in the municipality of Ås
- Brønnøysunds Avis, a print and online newspaper published in Brønnøysund
- Enebakk Avis, a newspaper published in Enebakk
- Farsunds Avis, a newspaper published in Farsunds
- Haugesunds Avis, a daily newspaper published in Haugesund
- Hortens Avis, a former newspaper, based in Horten
- Moss Avis, a newspaper published in Moss
- Rakkestad Avis, a newspaper published in Rakkestad
- Rogalands Avis, a newspaper published in Stavanger
- Sogn Avis, a newspaper published in Leikanger
- Sør-Varanger Avis, a newspaper published in Kirkenes
- Stavanger Avis, a newspaper published in Stavanger
- Skotfos Avis, a newspaper published in Skotfos
- Tvedestrand og Omegns Avis, a former newspaper, published in Tvedestrand
- Vesteraalens Avis, a newspaper published in Stokmarknes and covering the district of Vesterålen

== Germany ==
- Flensborg Avis, a Danish-language newspaper published in Flensburg, Germany
