= List of defunct newspapers of Germany =

This is a list of defunct newspapers of Germany.

- Allgemeine Zeitung
- Barid Al Sharq
- Coburger Zeitung
- Das Andere Deutschland
- Das Reich
- Das Schwarze Korps
- Der Angriff
- Der Morgen
- Der Pionier
- Der Stürmer
- Deutsche Allgemeine Zeitung
- Deutsche Volkszeitung
- Deutsche Zeitung in den Niederlanden
- Deutsche Zeitung in Norwegen
- Die Einigkeit
- Die Rote Fahne
- Die Fanfare
- Financial Times Deutschland
- Frankfurter Zeitung
- Freie Presse (Alsace), not to be confused with today's Freie Presse (Saxony)
- Iskra
- Israelitisches Familienblatt
- Kreuzzeitung
- Leobschützer Kreisblatt
- Mülhauser Volksblatt
- Münchener Beobachter
- Münchener Post
- Neue Montagzeitung
- Neue Rheinische Zeitung
- Norsk-Tysk Tidsskrift
- NS Månedshefte
- Panzerbär
- Prizyv
- Regensburger Echo
- Rheinische Zeitung
- Rote Hand
- Völkischer Beobachter
- Vossische Zeitung
- Zeitzer Landspiegel
