= Odda =

Odda may refer to:

== Places ==
- Odda (town), a town in Ullensvang Municipality, Vestland county, Norway
- Odda Municipality, a former municipality in the old Hordaland county, Norway
- Odda Church, a church in the town of Odda in Norway
- Odda's Chapel, a surviving Anglo-Saxon church at Deerhurst in Gloucestershire, England

== People ==
- Odda of Deerhurst, an Anglo-Saxon nobleman active in the period from 1013 onwards
- Odda, Ealdorman of Devon, an Anglo-Saxon Ealderman fl. 878

== Other ==
- Odda FK, a football club based in the town of Odda in Norway
- Odda Nyhetsblad, a newspaper was used to be published in the town of Odda, Norway
- Odda Rutebuss, a bus company in Odda, Norway
- Carmenta odda, a moth of the family Sesiidae
- "Odda process" is another name for the Nitrophosphate process
- Octadecanedioic acid (ODDA), an 18-carbon dicarboxylic acid
