= Svein Olav Agnalt =

Norwegian politician (born 1949)

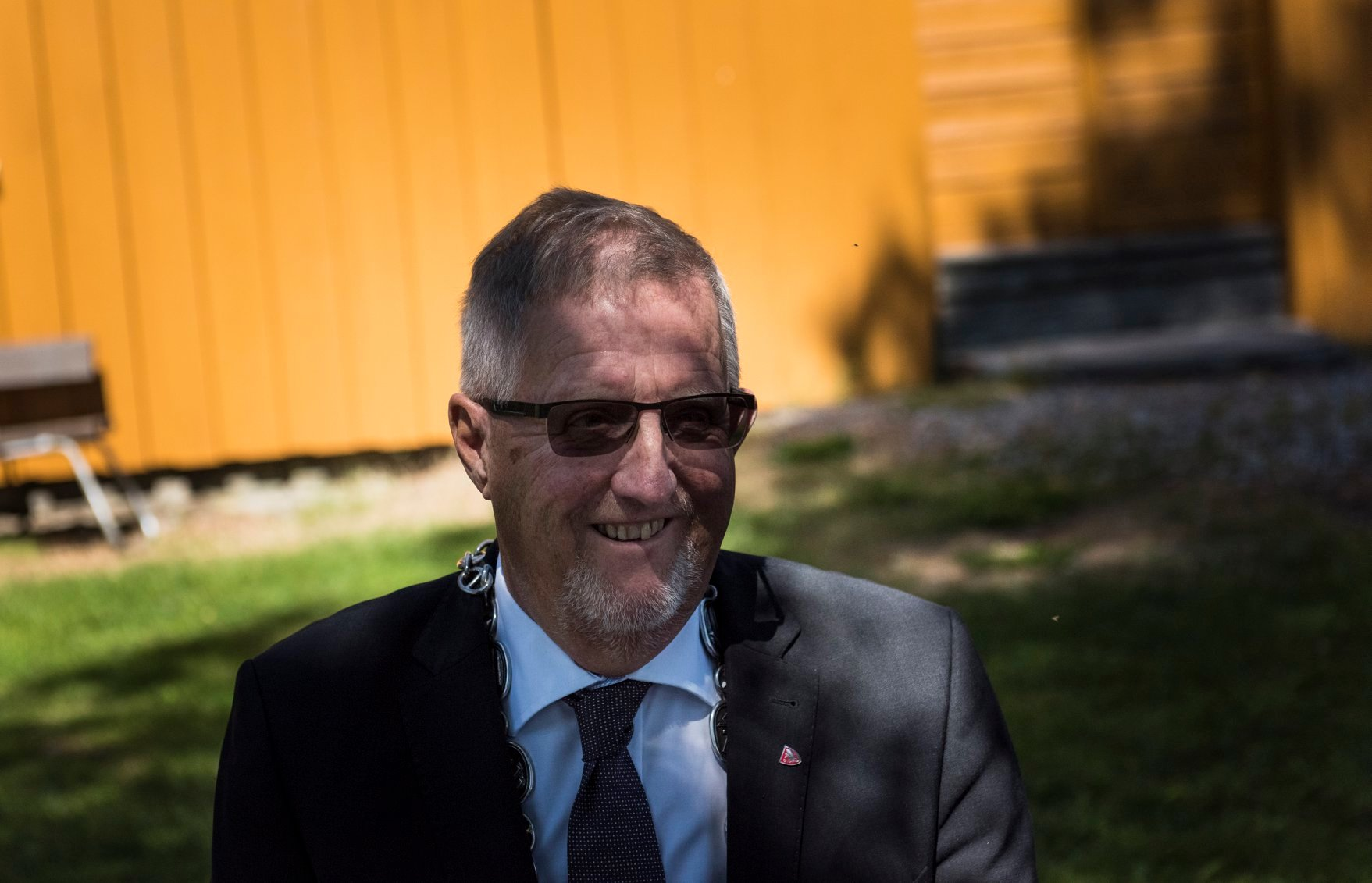
Svein Olav Agnalt

Svein Olav Agnalt (born 20 July 1949) is a Norwegian politician for the Labour Party.

He was born in Oslo. After taking the examen artium he was hired in the newspaper Øvre Smaalenene in 1969. He was also employed in the Co-operative Housing Federation of Norway before being hired in Østfold-Posten in 1978. He served as editor-in-chief until 1985.

He served as a deputy representative to the Parliament of Norway from Østfold during the term 1977–1981. Locally, he chaired the Workers' Youth League in Østfold, was a board member of Østfold Labour Party and was a member of Østfold county council. Agnalt later served as the mayor of Skiptvet municipality from 2007 to 2019.
