= P. Moe-Johansen =

Norwegian newspaper editor and politician

Petter Moe-Johansen, usually known as P. Moe-Johansen (16 October 1882 – 1 April 1952) was a Norwegian newspaper editor and politician for the Labour and Social Democratic Labour parties.

== Early life and career ==
He was born in Ørskog Municipality. He started his journalistic career at the age of sixteen, and in 1904 he became editor-in-chief of the Aalesund newspaper Nybrott. He then edited Nordlys, and Den 1ste Mai. He took over from Johan Gjøstein in 1906, but fell out with the newspaper owners and the local party, and was replaced by Cornelius Holmboe in 1908. In 1911 Moe-Johansen took over the editor chair in Smaalenenes Socialdemokrat. He remained editor until 1943, when he was deposed as a part of Nazi rule. Nonetheless Tore Pryser reports him to have become positive to the Nazi rule after some time.

He was also a municipal politician. When his Labour Party split in 1921, Moe Johansen joined the more right-wing Social Democratic Labour Party. He was one of the main agitators in the labour press against the Twenty-one Conditions. When the parties reunited in 1927 he rejoined the Labour Party. Østfold county had been dominated completely by the Social Democratic Labour Party, as one of the few counties where the Labour Party was not largest.

When the parties reunited, Moe-Johansen's newspaper hoped to be the county newspaper, but it was instead diminished to a local newspaper as the cities Sarpsborg and Halden now both had newspapers.

He died in October 1952 and was buried in Glemmen.

Media offices
Preceded by Johan Gjøstein	Chief editor of Den 1ste Mai; 1906–1908	Succeeded by Cornelius Holmboe
Preceded by Christian Hilt	Chief editor of Smaalenenes Socialdemokrat; 1911–1943	Succeeded by Nazi editor
