= Krossen (disambiguation) =

Krossen is a village in Lindesnes municipality in Agder county, Norway.

Krossen may also refer to:

- Krossen (Kristiansand), a neighborhood in the city of Kristiansand, Agder county, Norway
- Krossen, Telemark, a village in Vinje municipality, Telemark county, Norway
- Krosno Odrzańskie (German: Krossen), a city in Krosno county, Poland

== See also ==
- Crossen (disambiguation)
