= List of defunct newspapers of France =

This is a list of defunct newspapers of France.

- L'Ami du peuple
- L'Appel
- Aujourd'hui
- L'Aurore
- La Citoyenne
- Combat
- Le Constitutionnel
- L'Étoile du Déséret
- La Femme libre
- La France
- La France au travail
- France-Soir
- La Fronde
- Le Gaulois
- La Gazette
- Le Globe
- L'Illustration
- L'Intransigeant
- Je suis partout
- Le Journal
- Journal des débats
- La Liberté
- La Lune
- La Marseillaise
- Le Matin
- Le Matin de Paris
- Le nouveau socialiste (1972–1976)
- Mülhauser Volksblatt
- La Nation française
- Le National (Paris)
- Paris-Soir
- Le Pays de France
- Le Père Duchesne (18th century)
- Le Fils du Père Duchêne (Paris Commune)
- Le Petit Français illustré
- Le Petit Journal
- Le Petit Parisien (1876–1944)
- Au Pilori
- Revue Hebdomadaire
- Le Soleil
- Le Temps
- L'Univers
- Le Vieux Cordelier
- La Voix des Femmes (19th century)
- La Voix des femmes (20th century)
- Die Zukunft
