= Holum Municipality =

Former municipality in Vest-Agder, Norway

Holum Municipality Holum herad
- Former municipality
- Holme herad (historic name)
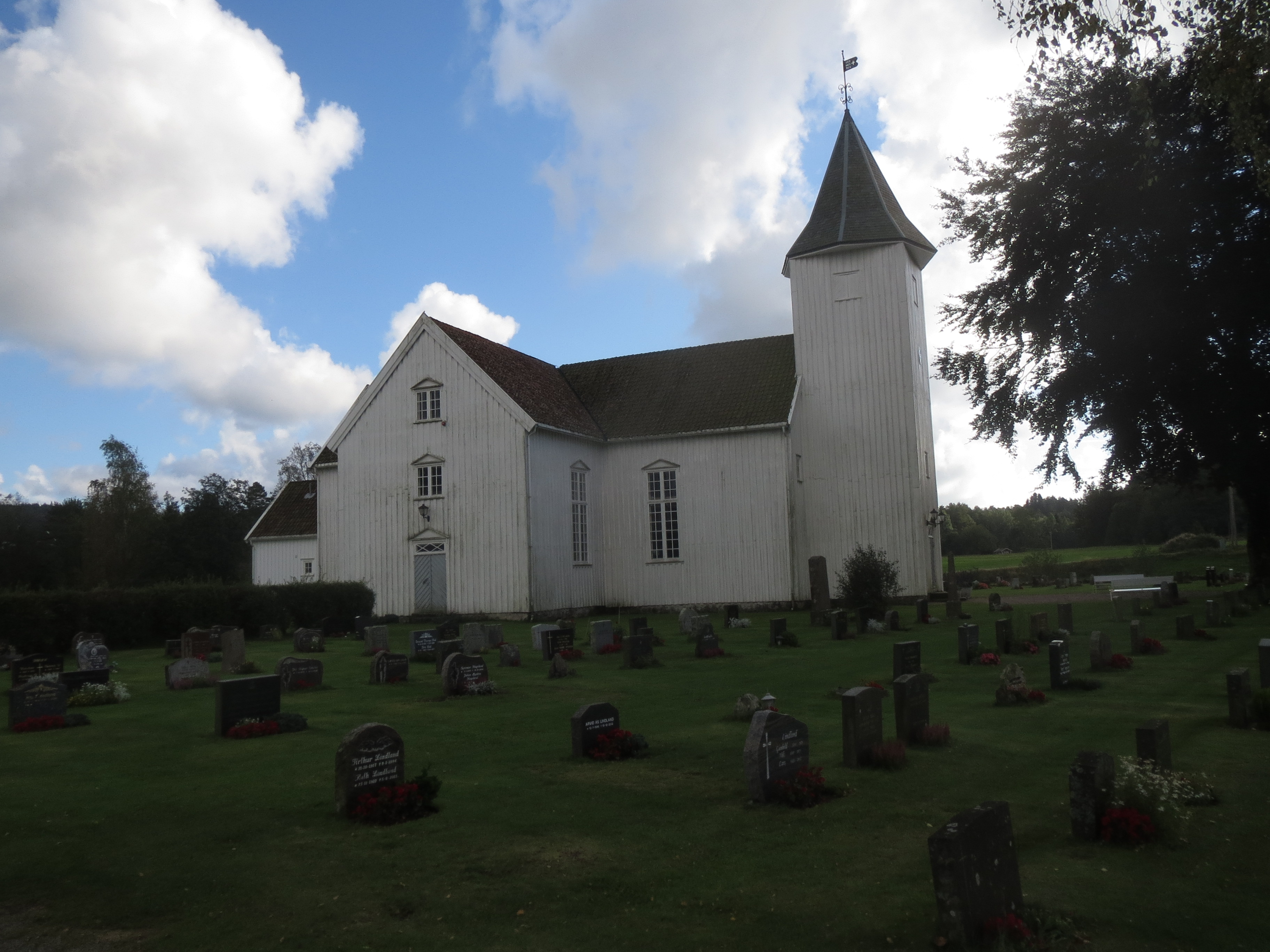
- View of local Holum Church

- Vest-Agder within Norway

- Holum within Vest-Agder
- Coordinates: 58°05′52″N 07°30′57″E
- Country: Norway
- County: Vest-Agder
- District: Sørlandet
- Established: 1 Jan 1838
  - Created as: Formannskapsdistrikt
- Disestablished: 1 Jan 1964
  - Succeeded by: Mandal Municipality
- Administrative centre: Krossen

Government
  - Mayor (1959–1963): Karl Kvidbergskår

Area (upon dissolution)
  - Total: 115.97 km^{2} (44.78 sq mi)
  - Rank: #489 in Norway
- Highest elevation: 315.5 m (1,035 ft)

Population (1963)
  - Total: 1,144
  - Rank: #591 in Norway
  - Density: 9.9/km^{2} (26/sq mi)
  - Change (10 years): ▼ −7.5%
- Demonym: Homesokning

Official language
  - Norwegian form: Nynorsk
- Time zone: UTC+01:00 (CET)
  - Summer (DST): UTC+02:00 (CEST)
- ISO 3166 code: NO-1020

Holum is a former municipality in the old Vest-Agder county, Norway. The 116-square-kilometre (45 sq mi) municipality existed from 1838 until its dissolution in 1964. The area is now part of Lindesnes Municipality in Agder county. The administrative centre was the village of Krossen where Holum Church is located.

Prior to its dissolution in 1964, the 115.97-square-kilometre (44.78 sq mi) municipality was the 489th largest by area out of the 689 municipalities in Norway. Holum Municipality was the 591st most populous municipality in Norway with a population of about 1,144. The municipality's population density was 9.9 inhabitants per square kilometre (26/sq mi) and its population had decreased by 7.5% over the previous 10-year period.

== General information ==
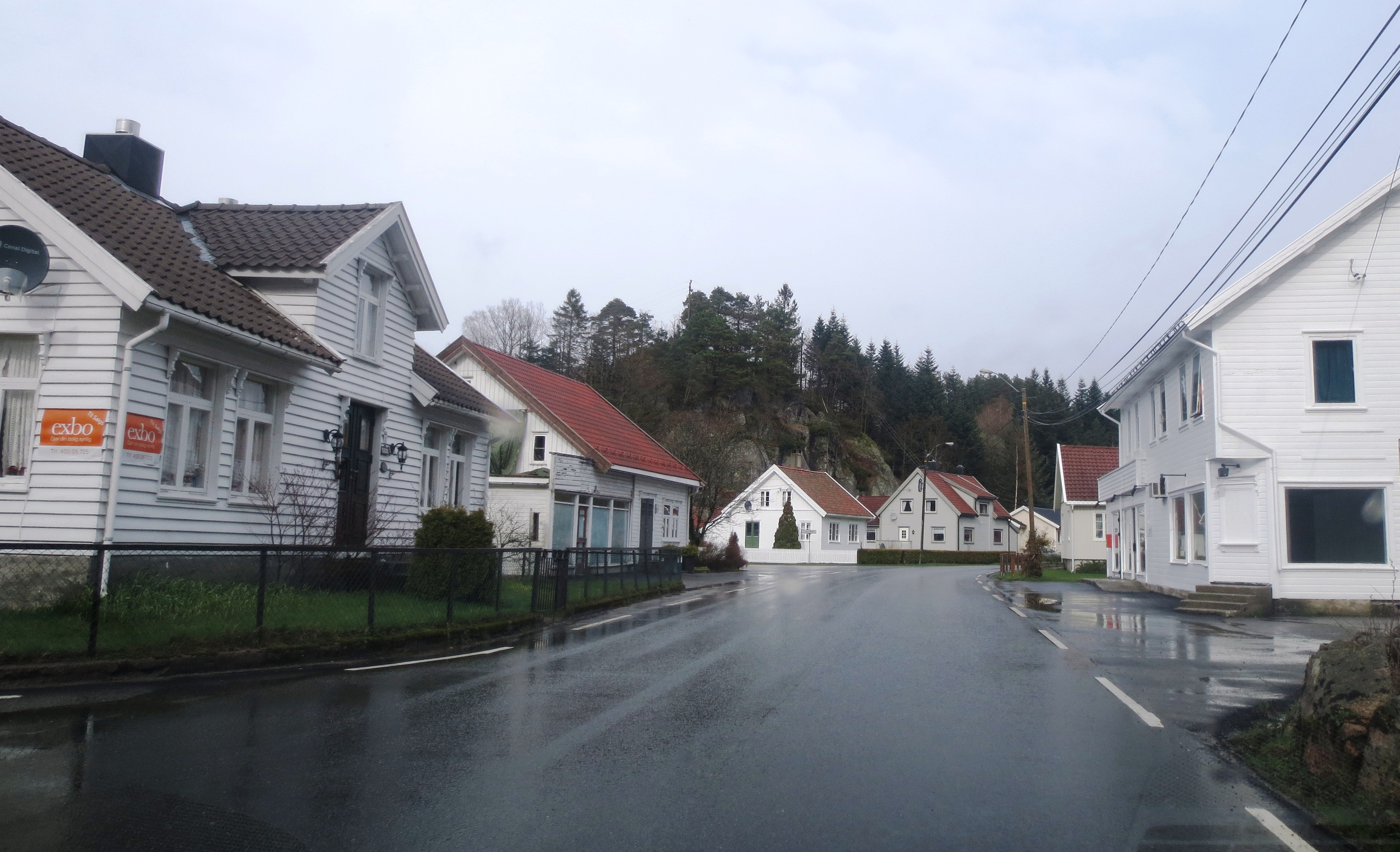
View of Krossen, the administrative centre of Holum Municipality

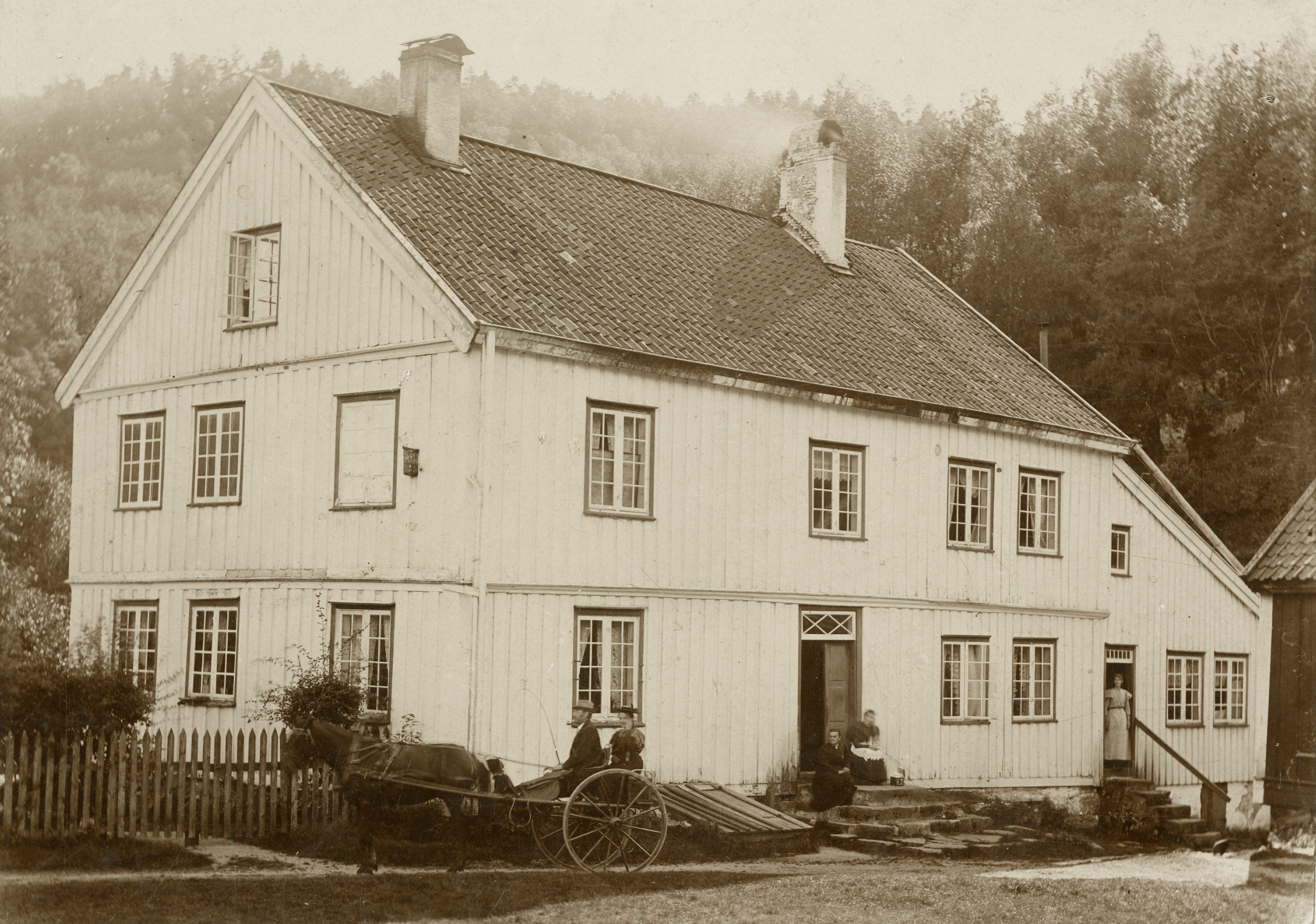
Holum prestegård (the parish priest's farm)

The parish of Holme (later spelled Holum) was established as a municipality on 1 January 1838 (see formannskapsdistrikt law).

During the 1960s, there were many municipal mergers across Norway due to the work of the Schei Committee. On 1 January 1964, the Stubstad and Svalemyr areas (population: 9) were transferred to the neighboring Søgne Municipality. On the same date, the rest of Holum Municipality was dissolved and the following areas were merged to form an enlarged Mandal Municipality:

- the rest of Holum Municipality (population: 1,127)
- all of Halse og Harkmark Municipality (population: 3,676)
- all of Mandal Municipality (population: 5,446)

=== Name ===
The municipality (originally the parish) is named after the old Holme farm (Old Norse: Holeimr) since the first Holum Church was built there. The first element is hol which means "hole" or "hollow". The last element comes from the word heimr which means "home" or "abode".

Historically, the name of the municipality was spelled Holme. On 3 November 1917, a royal resolution changed the spelling of the name of the municipality to Holum.

=== Churches ===
The Church of Norway had one parish (sokn) within Holum Municipality. At the time of the municipal dissolution, it was part of the Holum prestegjeld and the Mandal prosti (deanery) in the Diocese of Agder.

Churches in Holum Municipality
Parish (sokn)	Church name	Location of the church	Year built
Holum	Holum Church	Krossen	1825

== Geography ==
The municipality was located in the lower Mandalen valley, through which the river Mandalselva flows. The highest point in the municipality was the 315.5-metre (1,035 ft) tall mountain Svolheia. Øyslebø Municipality was located to the north, Søgne Municipality was located to the east, Halse og Harkmark Municipality was located to the south, and Sør-Audnedal Municipality was located to the west.

== Government ==
While it existed, Holum Municipality was responsible for primary education (through 10th grade), outpatient health services, senior citizen services, welfare and other social services, zoning, economic development, and municipal roads and utilities. The municipality was governed by a municipal council of directly elected representatives. The mayor was indirectly elected by a vote of the municipal council. The municipality was under the jurisdiction of the Mandal District Court and the Agder Court of Appeal.

=== Municipal council ===
The municipal council (Heradsstyre) of Holum Municipality was made up of representatives that were elected to four year terms. The tables below show the historical composition of the council by political party.

Holum heradsstyre 1959–1963
Party name (in Nynorsk)	Number of representatives
Labour Party (Arbeidarpartiet)	3
Joint List(s) of Non-Socialist Parties (Borgarlege Felleslister)	11
Local List(s) (Lokale lister)	3
Total number of members:	17
Note: On 1 January 1964, Holum Municipality became part of Mandal Municipality.

Holum heradsstyre 1955–1959
Party name (in Nynorsk)	Number of representatives
Labour Party (Arbeidarpartiet)	4
Joint List(s) of Non-Socialist Parties (Borgarlege Felleslister)	11
Local List(s) (Lokale lister)	2
Total number of members:	17

Holum heradsstyre 1951–1955
Party name (in Nynorsk)	Number of representatives
Labour Party (Arbeidarpartiet)	3
Joint List(s) of Non-Socialist Parties (Borgarlege Felleslister)	13
Total number of members:	16

Holum heradsstyre 1947–1951
Party name (in Nynorsk)	Number of representatives
Labour Party (Arbeidarpartiet)	2
Local List(s) (Lokale lister)	14
Total number of members:	16

Holum heradsstyre 1945–1947
Party name (in Nynorsk)	Number of representatives
Labour Party (Arbeidarpartiet)	3
Local List(s) (Lokale lister)	13
Total number of members:	16

Holum heradsstyre 1937–1941*
Party name (in Nynorsk)	Number of representatives
Labour Party (Arbeidarpartiet)	2
Local List(s) (Lokale lister)	14
Total number of members:	16
Note: Due to the German occupation of Norway during World War II, no elections were held for new municipal councils until after the war ended in 1945.

=== Mayors ===
The mayor (Nynorsk: ordførar) of Holum Municipality was the political leader of the municipality and the chairperson of the municipal council. The following people have held this position:

- 1838–1839: Rev. Koss
- 1839–1841: J.F. Knudsen
- 1842–1843: Peder Sørensen Holmesland
- 1844–1846: Andreas Andersen Holbek
- 1847–1859: Simon Pedersen Lie
- 1860–1861: Søren Pedersen Jaabæk (V)
- 1862–1883: Simon Pedersen Lie
- 1884–1887: Even Rejersen (V)
- 1888–1891: Ole Aanensen Hauge
- 1892–1895: Nils Pedersen Svinstad
- 1895–1899: Ole Aanensen Hauge
- 1899–1903: Nils Pedersen Svinstad
- 1903–1907: Ole Aanensen Hauge
- 1908–1910: Peder Andreassen Kjær
- 1911–1916: Andreas Kaddeland
- 1917–1919: Søren Holmesland
- 1920–1925: Nils Holbek
- 1925–1928: Karl Olsen Hvidbergskår
- 1929–1931: Nils Holbek
- 1932–1941: Nils Tobiassen Upsaker
- 1941–1943: Hans Holmesland
- 1943–1945: Ernst Solaas
- 1945–1945: Nils Tobiassen Upsaker
- 1946–1947: Nils Holbek
- 1948–1959: Anders Sløgedal
- 1959–1963: Karl Kvidbergskår

== See also ==
- List of former municipalities of Norway
