= Hallingdølen =

Newspaper in Norway

- Type: Local newspaper
- Format: Tabloid
- Editor-in-chief: Bjarne Tormodsgard
- Founded: 1936
- Language: Norwegian
- Headquarters: Ål
- Website: Hallingdølen

Hallingdølen is a Norwegian-language local newspaper published in Ål, Norway, which serves Hallingdal.

== Profile ==
Hallingdølen was established in 1936. The paper is not owned by one of the large media conglomerates. It was founded by community members. The paper is published three times per week and has its headquarters in Ål. It was published in broadsheet format until 1995 when it switched to tabloid format. Bjarne Tormodsgard is the editor-in-chief of the paper.

Both in 2013 and 2021 Hallingdølen was awarded the European Newspaper of the Year in the category of local newspapers.

In 2007 the circulation of Hallingdølen was 10,215 copies.

Awards
Preceded by Os og Fusaposten	Local Newspaper of the Year in Norway; 2006	Succeeded by Øyene
Preceded by Øyene	Local Newspaper of the Year in Norway; 2009	Succeeded by N/A
