= Local Newspaper of the Year =

- Native name: Årets lokalavis
- Description: Annual Norwegian award recognizing journalistic and operational excellence in local newspapers
- Country: Norway
- Presented by: National Association of Local Newspapers

Local Newspaper of the Year (Norwegian: Årets lokalavis) is a Norwegian award that is conferred every year by the country's National Association of Local Newspapers. It was awarded for the first time in 1989. The newspaper Hallingdølen has won the prize four times: in 2005, 2008, 2012, and 2014.

== List of winners ==
- 1989: Lofot-Tidende
- 1990: no prize
- 1991: Os og Fusaposten
- 1992: Trønderbladet
- 1993: Sykkylvsbladet
- 1994: Fjordabladet
- 1995: Lofot-Tidende
- 1996: Svalbardposten
- 1997: Østhavet
- 1998: Suldalsposten
- 1999: Levanger-Avisa
- 2000: Svalbardposten
- 2001: Steinkjer-Avisa
- 2002: Vennesla Tidende
- 2003: Rakkestad Bygdeblad
- 2004: Os og Fusaposten
- 2005: Hallingdølen
- 2006: Øyene
- 2007: Øyene
- 2008: Hallingdølen
- 2009: Våganavisa
- 2010: Svalbardposten
- 2011: Dalane Tidende
- 2012: Hallingdølen
- 2013: Suldalsposten
- 2014: Hallingdølen
- 2015: Sogn Avis
- 2016: Sunnhordland
- 2017: Lister
- 2018: Kvinnheringen
