= Svalbardposten =

Norwegian online newspaper

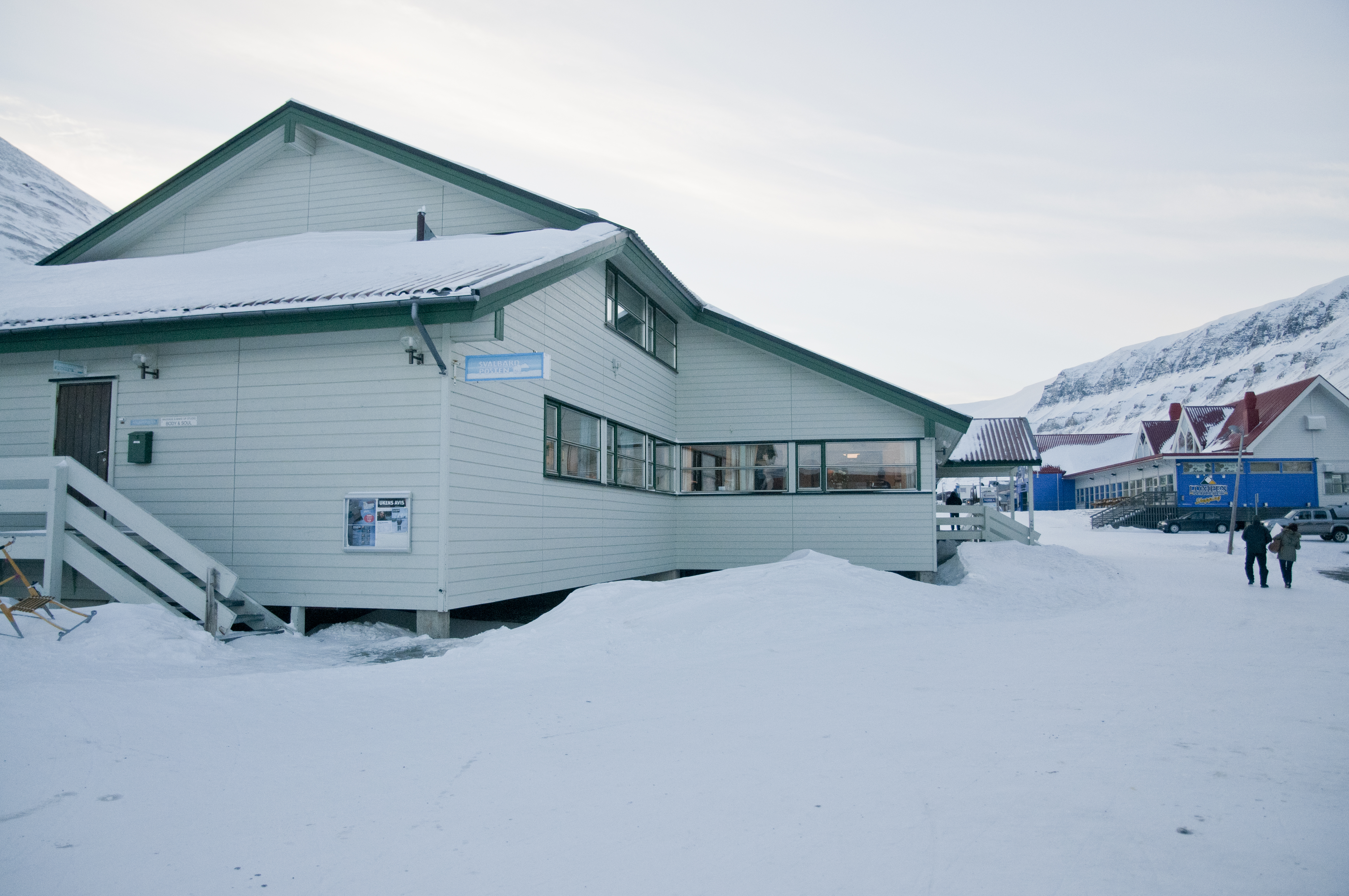
- Type: Monthly newspaper
- Format: A4
- Owner(s): Svalbardposten Foundation
- Editor: Line Nagell Ylvisåker
- Founded: 1948; 77 years ago
- Language: Norwegian
- Headquarters: Longyearbyen
- Circulation: 2,636 (2014)

Svalbardposten, founded in 1948, is a Norwegian online newspaper with one monthly paper edition. It operates from Longyearbyen in Svalbard, Norway, and is published the first Friday in the month. It is the northernmost regularly published newspaper in the world. In 2014, it had a circulation of 2,636 copies every week. According to its estimates, it has more subscribers than there are people on Svalbard. Svalbardposten has five employees.

== The newspaper today ==
The newspaper was printed by a printing press in Svalbard until 1996, which explains the paper's A4 format. Today, the newspaper is printed in Tromsø, Norway. Svalbardposten has been awarded the Local Newspaper of the Year Award three times, most recently in 2010. The award is handed out by the LLA, the organisation of local newspapers in Norway.

Today they mainly focus on publishing news on their online platform, Svalbardposten.no.

== The history ==
Svalbardposten started more or less as a wall poster, normally with four pages. The paper was hung up on the buildings where the coal miners were living. In the beginning the paper was described as "sometimes funny", but with "little information and seriousness". Throughout the years, the newspaper gradually became more professional. In the first years, the newspaper was published from September to May. But from 1986, Svalbardposten was published every Friday the whole year.

After some economically tough years in the 1980s, the Norwegian Ministry of Justice intervened to save the paper. A foundation, Stiftelsen Svalbardposten, was established in 1992. The foundation now owns the newspaper, while a joint-stock company, Svalbardposten AS, publishes the newspaper.

In 1997, Svalbardposten launched its own website. Since September 2012, the readers need a subscription to read the news on the website.

After several years of seeing the numbers drop in paper subscribers and rising numbers of online subscribers, the news paper in November 2023 cut down their weekly edition to one edition in the month.
