= Johan Gjøstein =

Norwegian politician

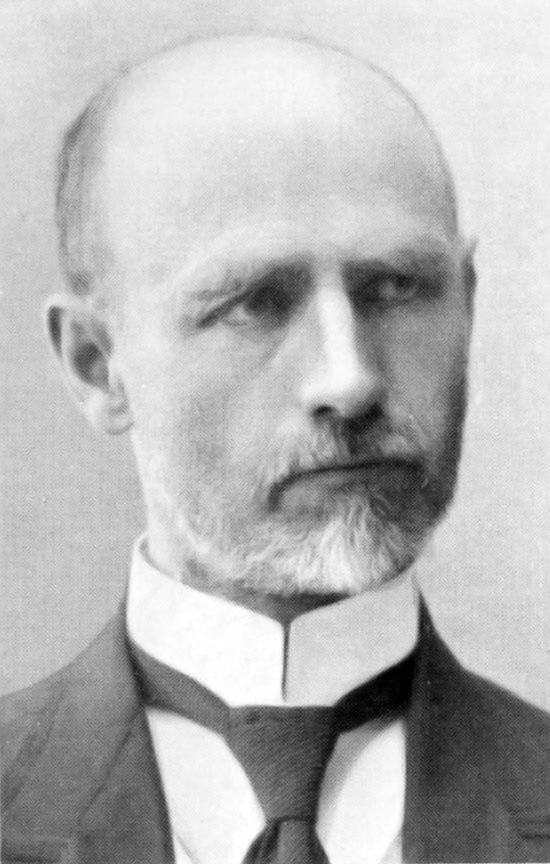
Johan Gjøstein.jpg

Johan David Haslund Gjøstein (5 January 1866 – 15 February 1935) was a Norwegian educator, newspaper editor and politician.

== Personal life ==
Johan Gjøstein was born at Hystad in Stordøen Municipality as the son of teacher Amund Vikingsen Gjøstein (1820–1873) and his wife Anne Munthe Olsen (1826–1901). He was the younger brother of politician and educationalist Ole Georg Gjøsteen.

Johan Gjøstein was married to Anna Gjøstein, an early women's rights pioneer and socialist politician.

== Career ==
Johan Gjøstein completed his teacher's education in Stord in 1884, and was hired as a primary school teacher in Stavanger the same year. He left after one year, but returned in 1890. Parallel with his teaching position, he worked as a newspaper editor for six years. He founded the small, handwritten newspaper 1ste Mai in 1895. The newspaper only lasted for eight issues, but returned on 30 September 1899 and still exists. Gjøstein sat as editor from 1899 to 1906. In 1909 Gjøstein left his teaching position to become headmaster. He supported the idea of the comprehensive school, of which his brother was one of the foremost proponents in Norway, to the point of being called "the father of the comprehensive school in Norway".

In 1898 Johan Gjøstein was elected for the first time to the city council of Stavanger. He then served in the executive committee from 1901 to 1910, and as mayor from 1911 to 1912. After this he continued as a regular council member until 1931. In 1912 he was also elected to the Norwegian Parliament, representing the Labour Party. He was re-elected in 1915 and 1918, serving through 1921. He had formerly ran for election unsuccessfully in 1906 and 1909.

In December 1921 Gjøstein was appointed school director of the dioceses of Agder and Stavanger. In the same year, a faction of the Labour Party broke away to form the Social Democratic Labour Party, due to disagreements over the Labour Party involvement in Comintern and adaption of the Twenty-one Conditions. Gjøstein followed the breakaway faction, and was elected for the Social Democratic Labour Party in 1922, representing the Market towns of Vest-Agder and Rogaland counties. This was his final term in Parliament.

In Stavanger, Gjøstein was a member of the board of the local electricity works, the museum, the school board. He chaired the local Labour Party chapter for some time, and co-founded several trade union. He was a member of several national political committees, including the committee that planned the Sørland Line. He was also a deputy board member of the Bank of Norway.

He left the position as school director on 1 January 1935, and died in the same year.

Media offices
| New post | Chief editor of Den 1ste Mai; 1899–1906 | Succeeded by P. Moe-Johansen |
Political offices
| Preceded by Kristoffer B. L. Berg | Mayor of Stavanger; 1911–1912 | Succeeded by Oddmund Vik |
