= Meieribyen =

Town in Skiptvet, Norway

Coordinates: 59.4775°N 11.1616°E

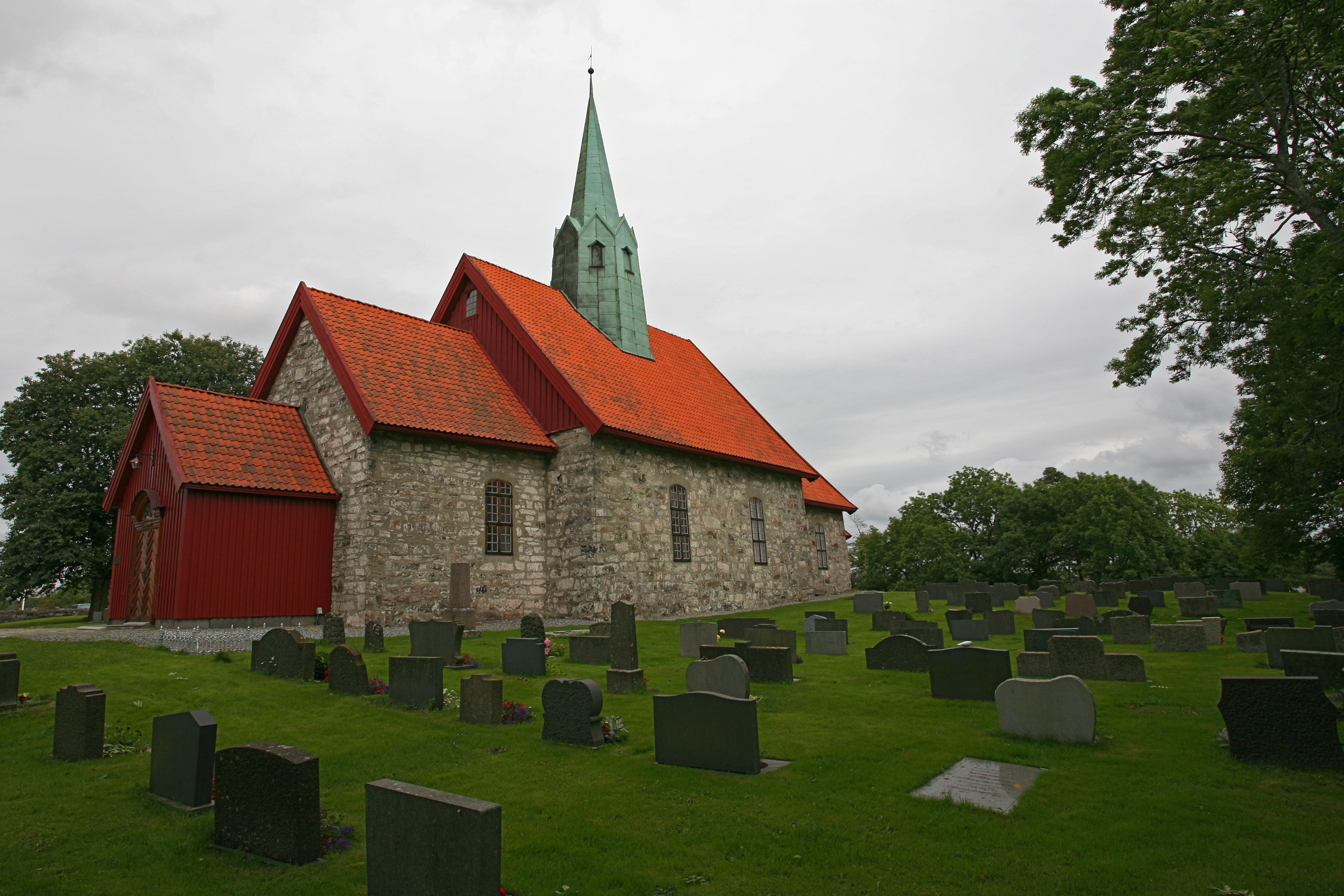
Meieribyen

Meieribyen is a town and an administrative center in the municipality of Skiptvet, Norway. The town has an area of 1.2 kilometres (0.75 mi) and had a population of 1,891 as of 2023.
