= Crossen =

Crossen

- Kendell Foster Crossen, detective story author
- Crossens, a district of Southport

== See also ==
- Krossen
- Krosno
