= Rakkestad Bygdeblad =

Norwegian newspaper

Rakkestad Bygdeblad was a Norwegian newspaper, published in Rakkestad in Østfold county.

== History and profile ==
Rakkestad Bygdeblad was started on 4 September 2002 as a competitor to Rakkestad Avis, which until then had a monopoly as a local newspaper. Journalist Carsten Lier was hired as editor, and two years after launch the newspaper had a circulation of 1,441 copies. It was originally published on Mondays, Wednesdays, and Fridays, the same as Rakkestad Avis, but soon changed to Tuesdays, Thursdays, and Saturdays. In 2004 the newspaper won the Local Newspaper of the Year award from the National Association of Local Newspapers.

In late 2004 the newspaper launched the free magazine Østfoldmagasinet, which had a circulation of 98,000 copies. From 2006 Rakkestad Bygdeblad was distributed on a fourth day in the week, freely, to counter economic problems. Nonetheless, it went defunct in 2008.

Awards
Preceded by Vennesla Tidende	Local Newspaper of the Year in Norway; 2004	Succeeded by Os og Fusaposten
