= Os og Fusaposten =

Norwegian newspaper

- Type: Two-day-a-week newspaper
- Format: Tabloid
- Owner(s): Christian Fr. Stabell (10,6%) Laila Beate Stabell (7,3%) Other owners (82,1%)
- Editor: Christian Fr. Stabell
- Founded: 1987
- Headquarters: Osøyro, Vestland
- Circulation: 5793
- Website: osogfusa.no/

Os og Fusaposten is a local newspaper published in Osøyro in Vestland county, Norway. It was established in 1987.

In 2007 it had a circulation of 5793, of whom 4981 are subscribers.

Os og Fusaposten was given the Local Newspaper of the Year award in Norway in 2005. The award is presented by the National Association of Local Newspapers.

Awards
Preceded by Rakkestad Bygdeblad	Local Newspaper of the Year in Norway; 2005	Succeeded by Hallingdølen
