= Søren Jaabæk =

Norwegian politician

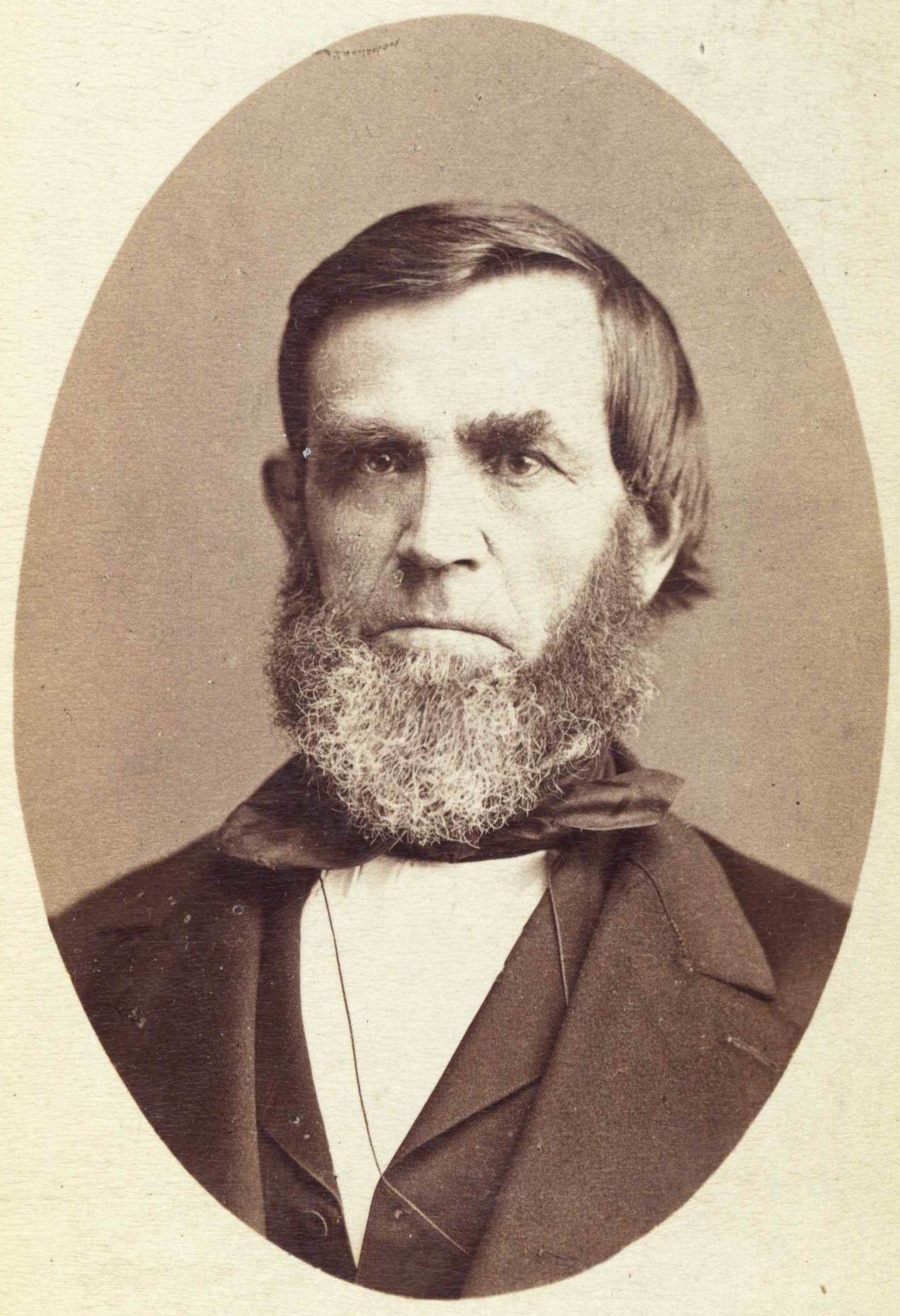

Member of the Norwegian Parliament
- In office 1845–1891
- Constituency: Lister og Mandals amt

Personal details
- Born: Søren Pedersen Jaabæk; 1 April 1814 Holme
- Died: 7 January 1894 (aged 79)
- Party: Liberal Party; Moderate Liberal Party
- Occupation: Farmer, teacher, church official

Søren Pedersen Jaabæk (1 April 1814 – 7 January 1894) was a Norwegian politician and farmer. Jaabæk is the longest-serving member of the Norwegian Parliament in the history of Norway, and was one of the founders of the Liberal Party of Norway.

== Early life ==
Jaabæk was born in Holme in Lister og Mandals amt, Norway in 1814. After living in Halse og Harkmark Municipality for some years, he returned to Holme Municipality following his father's death in 1849. He began his professional life working in schools and churches. He served several terms as mayor of Holme Municipality and in Halse og Harkmark Municipality between 1840 and 1890. In 1845, he was elected to the Norwegian Parliament, where he served until 1891.

== Political career ==
In 1865, Jaabæk founded Selskabet Bondevennerne (lit. "The Friends of the Peasants", inspired by a Danish society of the same name), a political society of Norwegian farmers which evolved from a local group in the nearby town of Mandal to a national movement, composed of more than 300 local bodies with approximately 30,000 members in total. Through Bondevennerne, Jaabæk introduced the open popular meeting to Norwegian politics, and the first Norwegian cooperatives emerged as offshoots of the Bondevennerne movement. Bondevennerne's main newspaper, Folketidende, was also founded by Jaabæk in Mandal in 1865. Jaabæk was elected chairman of Bondevennerne in 1868.

In parliamentary politics, Jaabæk eventually emerged as the leader of the oppositional alliance of farmers. He often sided with Johan Sverdrup, a major representative of the urban liberal opposition. In 1869, Jaabæk and Sverdrup became political allies, thus establishing an alliance between the urban and the rural opposition, which would lead to the foundation of the Liberal Party of Norway (led by Sverdrup) in 1884. By 1884, little remained of Bondevennerne. Some of the remaining bodies gradually became local Liberal bodies. Jaabæk never became one of the leading figures of the new party, but he remained a supporter of Sverdrup for the remainder of his political career. For his last parliamentary term, Jaabæk represented the Moderate Liberal Party. He left the Norwegian Parliament in 1891. In 1884 he was a co-founder of the Norwegian Association for Women's Rights.

Jaabæk supported economic liberalism and was widely known for his opposition to high governmental spending. His alleged stubbornness in economic matters earned him the nickname "Neibæk" ("No-bæk"). Due to his rationalistic approach to Christianity, as well as his view of positions in the church as ordinary professions, he became at odds with the Norwegian clergy in the 1870s. Jaabæk supported many democratic reforms, and spoke up for universal suffrage and equal marriage rights for men and women.

Jaabæk died in 1894.

== Bibliography ==
- Jaabæk, Søren (1860). Om det norske, danske og svenske Skydsvæsen. Christiania: S. Jaabæk.
- Jaabæk, Søren (1870). Englands Historie for det norske Folk. Mandal.
- Westrem, L. (1873). Politisk Sendebrev til Storthingsmand Søren Jaabæk med Efterskrift til de bondevenlige Foreninger. Moss.
- Riddervold, Julius (1876). Mit Forsvar i den mod mig af Storthingsmand Jaabæk anlagte Sag. Kristiania: Lund.
- Jaabæk, Søren (1880). Varme Piller til Brug imod de kolde Rivninger som Novemberforeningen fremavler. Kristiania: Askeland.
- Lamennais, Felicité Robert de (1881). For Friheden. Kristiania: Askeland.
- Jaabæk, Søren (1881). Varme Piller til Brug imod de kolde Rivninger som Novemberforeningen fremavler. Kristiania: Askeland.
- Luther, Martin (1882). Om den verdslige Øvrighed. Kristiania.
- Jaabæk, Søren (1882). Kongers og Kejseres levevis. Kristiania: M. Askeland.
- Jaabæk, Søren (1882). Kongers og Keiseres Levevis. Kristiania: M. Askeland.
- Jaabæk, Søren (1886). Kongers og Keiseres Levevis. Kristiania: Huseby.
