= Oddmund Vik =

Norwegian politician (1858-1930)

Oddmund Jakobsen Vik (19 April 1858 – 12 February 1930) was a Norwegian politician for the Liberal Party.

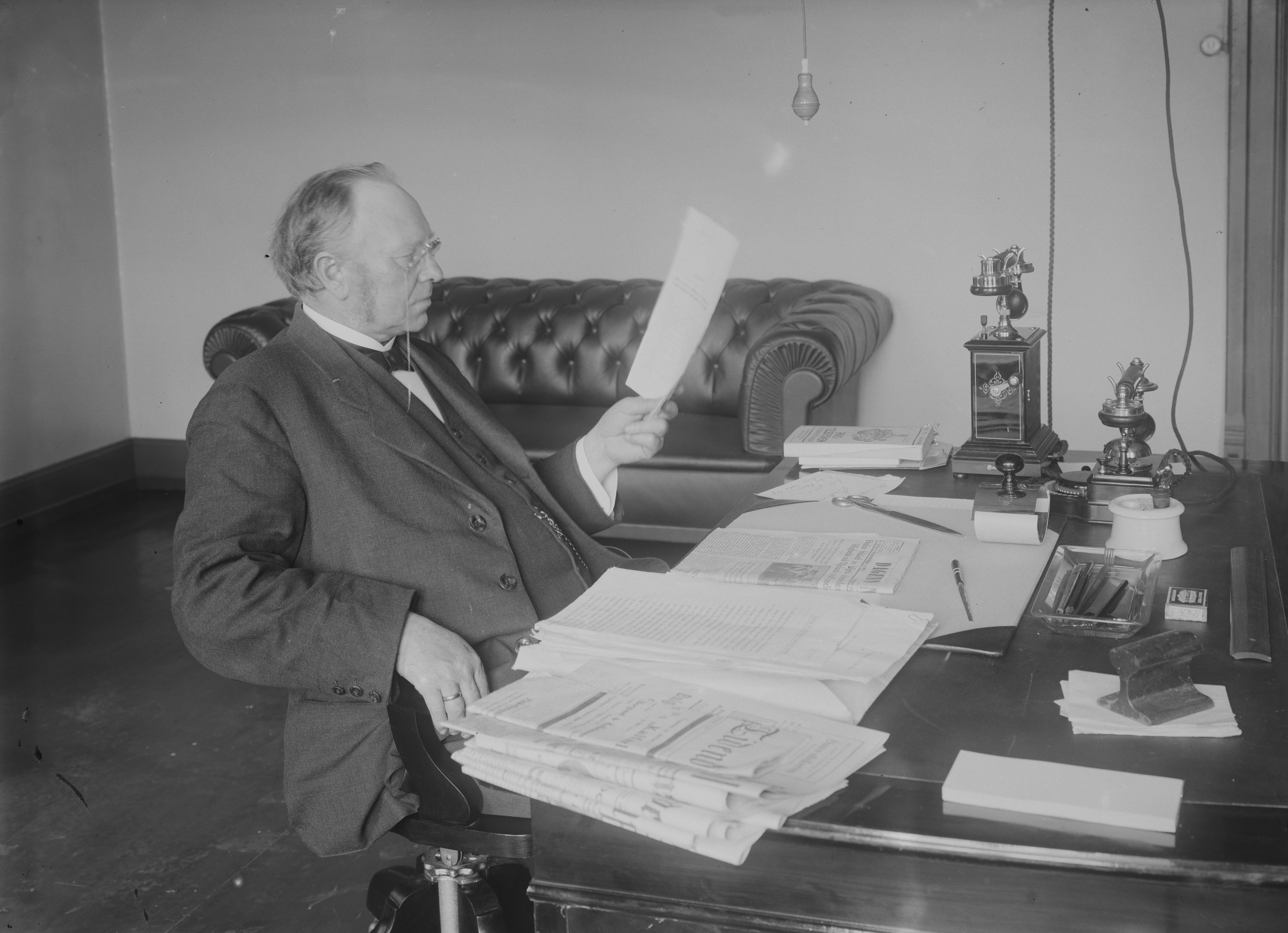
Oddmund Jakobsen Vik

He was born at Vik in Øystese as the son of farmer Jakob Larsen Vik (1828–1925) and his wife Magnhild Nilsdotter Laupsa (1828–1914). He graduated from the teacher's college in Stord Municipality in 1877, and worked as a teacher in Sund Municipality in 1878, at Sagatun folk high school the next year, in Telemark from 1879, in Askov from 1882 and Andebu from 1884 to 1888. In 1885 he wrote a piece in Dagbladet, "Fra Ekserserpladsen Tvildemoen", which was seen as anti-military agitation. He was sentenced to 40 days in prison by a military court; the sentence was upheld by the Supreme Court. He was also ordered to pay NOK 100 in costs. However, the government of Norway changed the sentencing to ten days in prison and no costs.

In 1888 he was hired as chief editor of Rogalands Folkeblad. The next year the name was changed to Stavanger Avis, and Vik was hired as subeditor under new editor Alexander Kielland. He then worked as chief editor again from 1890 to 1908. He was the chairman of the board of Venstres Presseforening from 1899 to 1900. He was active in local politics, serving as deputy mayor of Stavanger Municipality from 1898 to 1901 and 1904 to 1912, and mayor from 1913 to 1914. In 1900 he was elected to the Norwegian Parliament, representing the constituency Stavanger og Haugesund. He sat through one term, but was later re-elected in 1910.

In 1914 Vik was appointed County Governor of Romsdals Amt. The county was shortly thereafter renamed Møre, and is now known as Møre og Romsdal. During the First World War he briefly left this office, to lead the newly created Ministry of Provisioning in the second cabinet Knudsen from July 1916 to November 1917. When he left this position, he returned as County Governor of Møre, leaving in 1928 to become a pensioner.

Government offices
Preceded by Johan Gjøstein	Mayor of Stavanger; 1913–1914	Succeeded by L.T.K. Geertsen
New office	Norwegian Minister of Provisioning; 1916–1917	Succeeded by Birger Stuevold-Hansen
Preceded by Birger Kildal	County Governor of Møre og Romsdal; 1914–1928	Succeeded by Trygve Utheim
