= Andreas Hanssen =

Norwegian newspaper editor and politician

Hans Andreas Hanssen (29 April 1873 – 1960) was a Norwegian newspaper editor and politician for the Labour Party. He served two terms as an MP, and edited the newspapers Smaalenenes Social-Demokrat, Nybrott, 1ste Mai and Folket. Hanssen was a temperance activist in the years before World War II, and then joined Nasjonal Samling and worked as a priest.

== Career ==
Hanssen was born in Kråkerøy as a son of a blacksmith. After finishing middle school in 1889 he worked different office jobs in Fredrikstad, Fredrikshald and Kristiania. In 1906, Hanssen founded the newspaper Smaalenenes Social-Demokrat in Fredrikstad, and edited it until 1909. He moved to Fredrikshald where he traded art and ran a cigar shop. Hanssen served in the city council from 1910 to 1916, the first three years as deputy mayor. He was elected to the Parliament of Norway from the city in 1912, and served one term.

In 1916, Hanssen moved to Larvik to edit the newspaper Nybrott. He edited 1ste Mai in Stavanger from 1919 before returning to Larvik in 1921, this time as manager in Folkets Dagblad, established by a merger of Nybrott and Bratsberg-Demokraten. Hanssen was elected to the Parliament of Norway from the Market towns of Vestfold county in 1921, and served his second term. He was not re-elected. In the summer of 1923, Hanssen resigned his membership in the Labour Party, because of the religion policy of the Comintern. Hanssen was an active Methodist. He did not rejoin the Labour Party when it left the Comintern in late 1923, because he was still a "revolutionary internationalist".

From 1927 to 1929, Hanssen edited the temperance magazine Folket. After managing a rehab and a spa in Ørje between 1929 and 1931, he returned to Folket where he was treasurer from 1931 to 1934 and then editor again. Hanssen also edited the magazine Idun during his career. During the occupation of Norway by Nazi Germany, Hanssen joined the Fascist party Nasjonal Samling. They gave him the job as vicar for the Church of Norway (of which Hanssen had not been a member) in Hvaler. After the Second World War, he was convicted of treason in 1948 during the legal purge in Norway after World War II. He was sentenced to one year of prison and ten years of loss of voting rights. Hanssen died in 1960.
