= Fredriksstad Blad =

Norwegian newspaper

- Type: Daily newspaper
- Format: Tabloid (1986–present)
- Owner: Amedia (100%)
- Editor: Renè Svendsen
- Founded: 1889
- Political alignment: Non-partisan
- Headquarters: Fredrikstad, Norway
- Circulation: 22,877 (2005)
- Website: https://f-b.no

Fredriksstad Blad is the biggest local daily newspaper in Fredrikstad, Norway.

== History and profile ==
Fredriksstad Blad was established in 1889, but had a predecessor in Ugeblad for Fredriksstad, Sarpsborg og Omegn which started in 1843. It was published six times a week from 1905, and published daily since 1997. It changed to tabloid format in 1986, and launched its Internet site in 1996.

The competitor of Fredriksstad Blad is Demokraten. The chief editor of the former is Renè Svendsen. The paper is owned by Amedia.

In addition to Fredrikstad, Fredriksstad Blad covers the municipality of Råde. The paper had a circulation of 22,883 copies and had 22,266 subscribers in 2005.
