= Holum Church =

Church in Agder, Norway

- Holum kirke
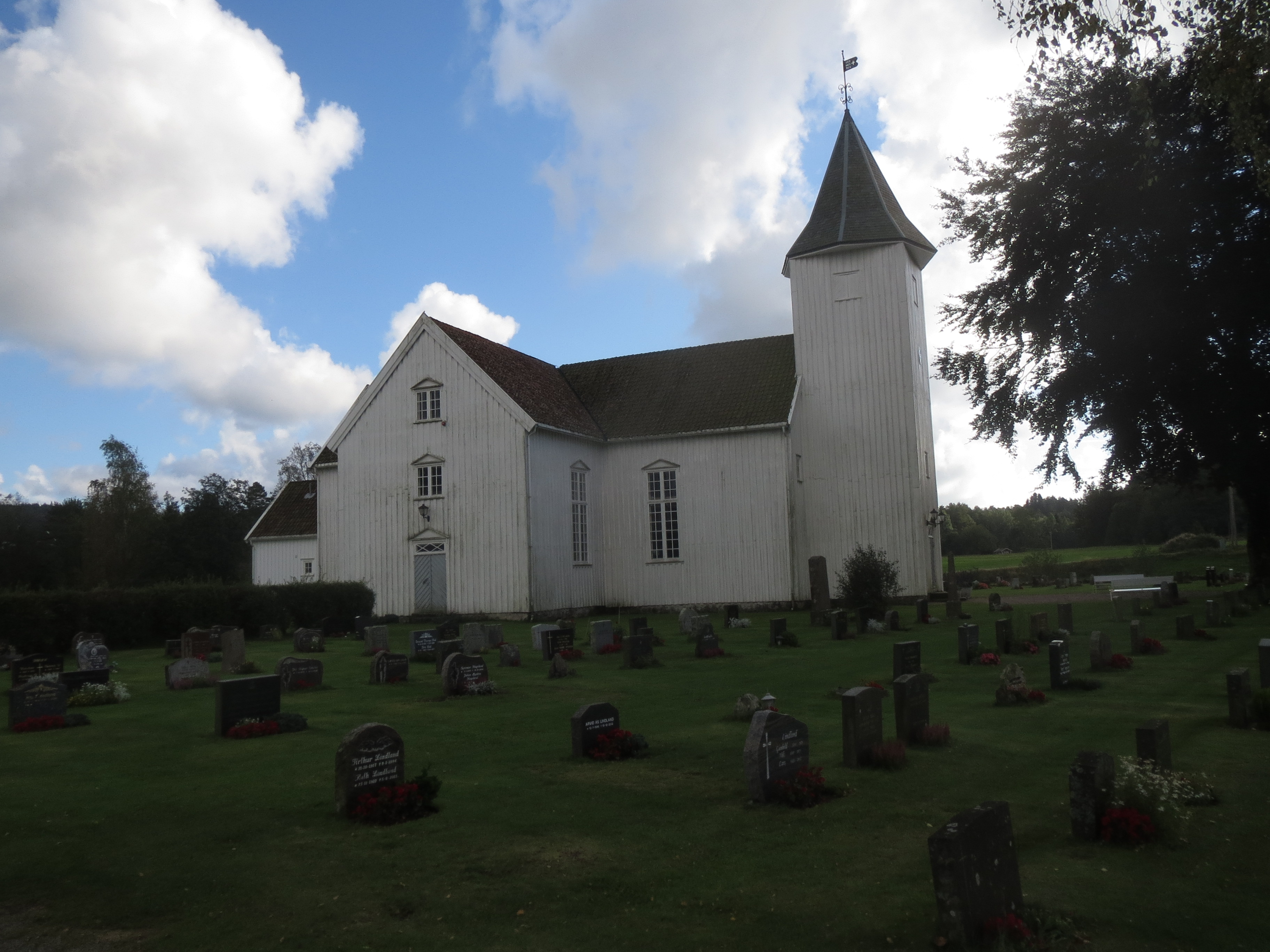
- View of the church
- Holum Church
- 58.09808°N 07.51474°E
- Location: Lindesnes Municipality, Agder
- Country: Norway
- Denomination: Church of Norway
- Previous denomination: Catholic Church
- Churchmanship: Evangelical Lutheran

History
- Status: Parish church
- Founded: 12th century
- Consecrated: 4 Sep 1825

Architecture
- Functional status: Active
- Architectural type: Cruciform
- Completed: 1825 (201 years ago)

Specifications
- Capacity: 480
- Materials: Wood

Administration
- Diocese: Agder og Telemark
- Deanery: Lister og Mandal prosti
- Parish: Holum
- Norwegian Cultural Heritage Site
- Type: Church
- Status: Automatically protected
- ID: 84617

Holum Church (Norwegian: Holum kirke) is a parish church of the Church of Norway in Lindesnes Municipality in Agder county, Norway. It is located in the village of Krossen. It is the church for the Holum parish which is part of the Lister og Mandal prosti (deanery) in the Diocese of Agder og Telemark. The white, wooden church was built in a cruciform design in 1825 using plans drawn up by an unknown architect. The church seats about 480 people.

== History ==
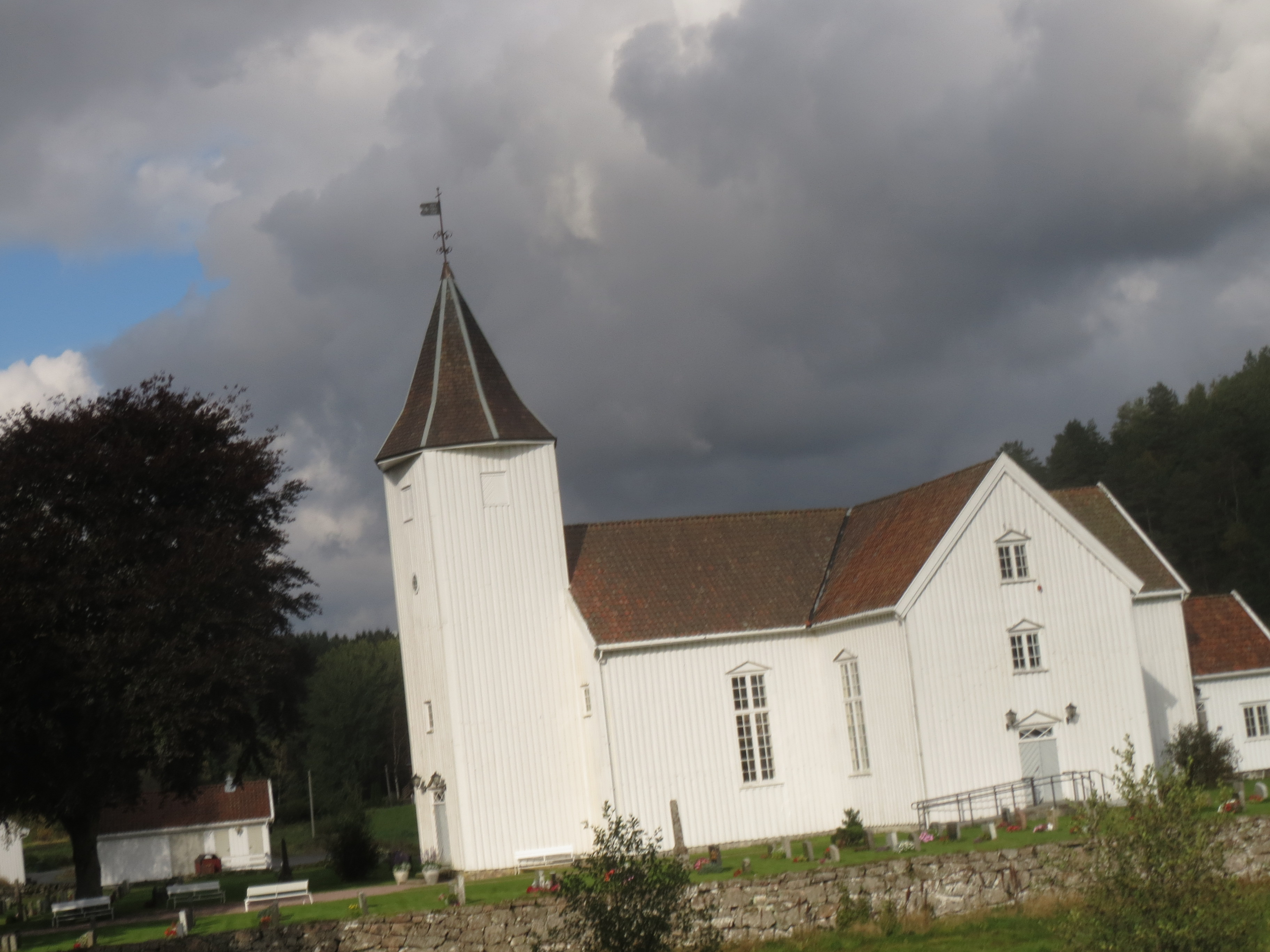
View of the church.

The earliest existing historical records of the church date back to the year 1307, but there is reason to believe that the stave church present then was already old. The church was likely built during the 12th century. According to local tradition, the oldest church must have stood on Monen, a former arid area about 800 metres (2,600 ft) south of the current church, by the river Mandalselva. Around the year 1550, an old Holum Church was torn down and replaced with a timber-framed building with a long church design on the same site where the present church sits.

In 1814, this church served as an election church (Norwegian: valgkirke). Together with more than 300 other parish churches across Norway, it was a polling station for elections to the 1814 Norwegian Constituent Assembly which wrote the Constitution of Norway. This was Norway's first national elections. Each church parish was a constituency that elected people called "electors" who later met together in each county to elect the representatives for the assembly that was to meet at Eidsvoll Manor later that year.

In 1823, the church was again torn down and a new cruciform church was built on the same site. The new church was mostly completed in 1824 and consecrated on 4 September 1825 by the Bishop Johan Storm Munch.

== See also ==
- List of churches in Agder og Telemark
