= Lister (Farsunds Avis) =

Norwegian daily newspaper

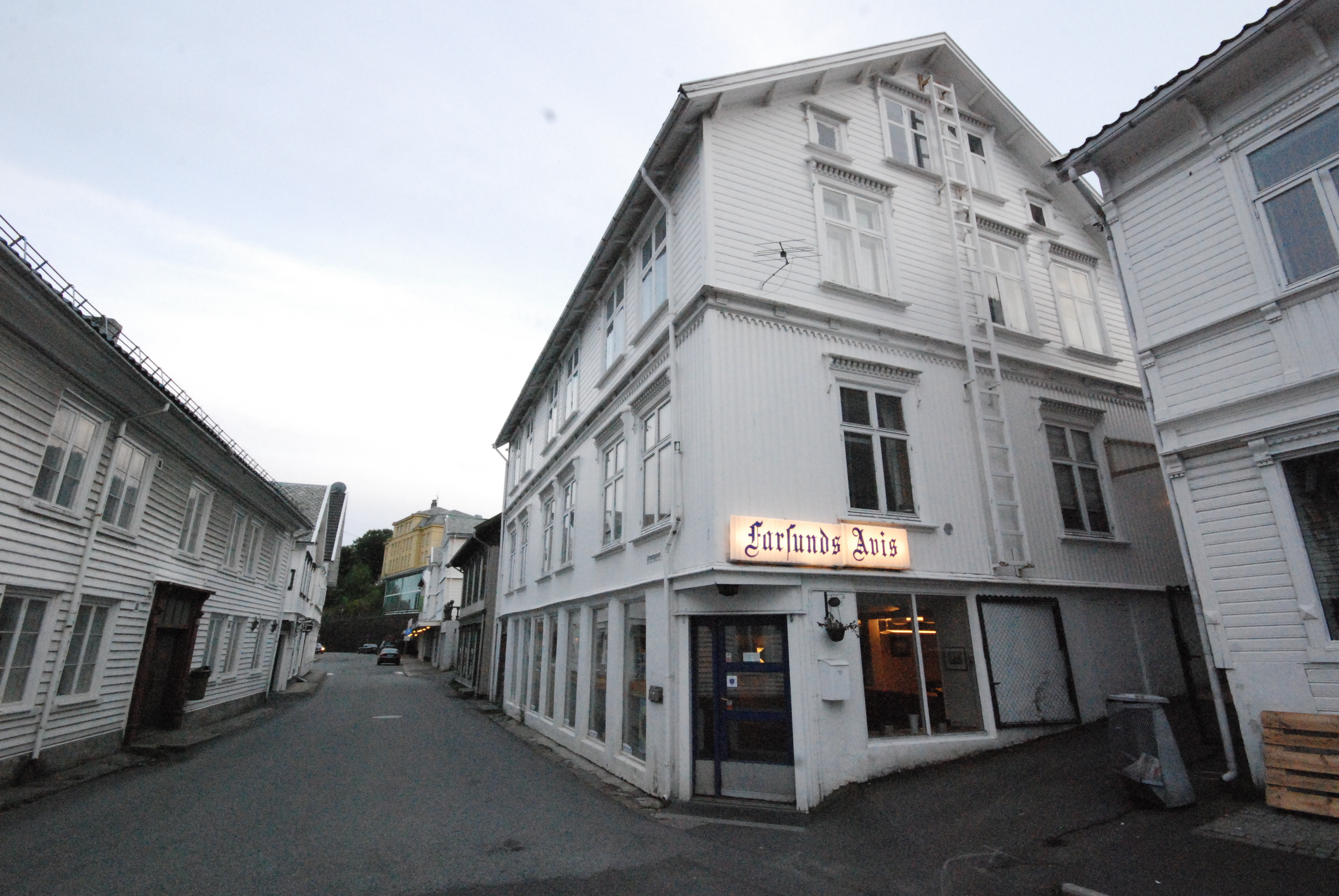
- Type: Daily newspaper
- Format: Compact
- Owner(s): Fædrelandsvennen AS (86.2%), Glastad Invest AS (7.7%), others (6.1%)
- Editor: Sveinung W. Jensen
- Founded: 1889
- Political alignment: Conservative
- Language: Norwegian
- Headquarters: Farsund
- Circulation: 5,273 (2016)
- Website: www.lister24.no

Lister (named Farsunds Avis until May 2014) is a local newspaper published in Farsund, Norway. It covers the Lister Region in southwestern Norway, with its main coverage area in Farsund Municipality, Lyngdal Municipality, and Hægebostad Municipality. The newspaper was established in 1889 as Farsunds Avis, but changed its name to Lister in May 2014. It also runs the news site lister24.no.

== Farsunds Avis today ==
In 2016 it had a circulation of 5,273. The newspaper is published by AS Farsunds Aktiebogtrykkeri, which is mainly owned by Fædrelandsvennen AS (86.2%), Glastad Invest AS (7.7%), Odd Reidar Øie (2.9%), Aslaug Bech Cutler (1.1%), and various other owners (2.1%).

Sveinung W. Jensen is editor-in-chief. Kjell Henrik Moen is the company's chairman.

== History ==
According to history, Farsunds Avis was born thanks to a misprint. The now defunct radical newspaper Lister (1873–1934) reported from a meeting in Farsund held by the Conservative Party of Norway. Officials from the Church were also present, and the newspaper undeliberately named them «presteskrap» instead of «presteskap». The single r changed the meaning completely in Norwegian, from «clergy» to «clergy rubbish».

The people of the upper class in Farsund were fed up and founded their own newspaper on 15 June 1889. Consul P. Sundt was the founding father and Farsunds Avis's first chairman.

In the 1970s, Farsunds Avis started offset printing and became a daily newspaper. The newspaper went from broadsheet to compact format 9 March 2002, and in May 2014 it changed name from Farsunds Avis to Lister, to clearly mark that it covers the whole region, and not just the Farsund area. The paper edition was also reduced from six to four days per week.

Lister is a conservative, but politically independent newspaper.
