= Stavanger Socialdemokrat =

Norwegian newspaper

Stavanger Socialdemokrat was a Norwegian newspaper, published in Stavanger in Rogaland county. It was affiliated with the Social Democratic Labour Party of Norway.

Stavanger Socialdemokrat was started in 1921, the same year the Social Democratic Labour Party broke away from the Norwegian Labour Party. In 1927 the Social Democratic Labour Party reconciled with the Labour Party, and the two parties again became one. At the same time, Stavanger Socialdemokrat ceased to exist.
