= Le nouveau socialiste =

- Type: Weekly (1972), Fortnightly (1973–1976)
- Editor: Lucien Brun
- Founded: 26 October 1972
- Ceased publication: 15 November 1976
- Political alignment: Socialist
- Language: Spanish, French
- Headquarters: 73 rue Bayard, Toulouse 43°36′40.7″N 1°27′7.4″E
- Circulation: 5,000
- OCLC number: 802984315

Le nouveau socialiste ('New Socialist') was a weekly newspaper in Spanish and French published from Toulouse, France from 1972 to 1976. It was an organ of the Spanish Socialist Workers' Party (historic) (PSOE(h)).

The first issue of Le nouveau socialiste was published on 26 October 1972. In 1973 it became a fortnightly. The issues of Le nouveau socialiste had four pages. It had a circulation of 5,000. Lucien Brun was the editor of Le nouveau socialiste. Jacques Cassan was the director of the publication. The last issue was published on 15 November 1976. Le nouveau socialiste was replaced by El Socialista, published from Madrid.
