= Rogaland (newspaper) =

Norwegian newspaper

Rogaland was a Norwegian newspaper, published in Stavanger in Rogaland county.

Rogaland was started in 1905, published in the city Haugesund under the name Dag. Already in 1907 its name was changed and its headquarters moved to Stavanger. It went defunct in 1919.
