= Østfold-Posten =

Norwegian newspaper

Østfold-Posten was a Norwegian newspaper, published in Askim in Østfold county.

It was established in 1917 under the name Folkets Røst, and was the local organ of the Norwegian Labour Party. The name Østfold-Posten was taken in 1959. Its circulation was 4,303 in 1983, and it was more widespread in Skiptvet than in Askim and Spydeberg. In 1990 it was absorbed by the somewhat larger city rival Øvre Smaalenene.
