= Rote Hand =

German right-wing newspaper (1918-1920)

Rote Hand ('Red Hand') was a weekly newspaper published from Munich, Germany around 1918–1920. Politically, it voiced opposition to the Weimar republic and socialism. The newspaper belonged to a tendency that later became associated with National Socialism.
