= Flekkefjords Budstikke =

Norwegian newspaper

Flekkefjords Budstikke, Saturday, November 7, 1874

Flekkefjords Budstikke was a Norwegian newspaper, published in Flekkefjord. It was started in 1874 and went defunct in 1890.

== See also ==
- Norwegian newspapers
