= Egersundsposten =

Norwegian newspaper

Egersundsposten was a Norwegian newspaper, published in Egersund in Rogaland county.

Egersundsposten was started in 1865. It went defunct in 1940.
