= Odda Rutebuss =

Norwegian bus company

Odda Rutebuss AS
- Type: Private
- Industry: Transport
- Founded: 1924
- Headquarters: Odda, Norway
- Area served: Odda
- Revenue: 10 million kr
- Website: www.odda-rutebuss.no

Odda Rutebuss AS is a bus company that operates in Odda, Norway. Founded in 1924, it operates 11 buses with 16 employees, transporting 250,000 passengers per year. In 2008 it lost the public service obligation tender for Odda to Tide Buss, after which Odda Rutebuss remains only as a charter operator.
