= Lillesands Tidende =

Norwegian newspaper

Lillesands Tidende was a Norwegian newspaper, published in Lillesand in Agder county.

Lillesands Tidende was started in 1886 as Lillesands Tilskuer. Its name was changed in 1918. It went defunct in 1921.
