= Folketidende =

Norwegian newspaper

Folketidende was a Norwegian newspaper published in Mandal between 1865 and 1879.

== History and profile ==
Folketidende was founded in 1865 by Søren Jaabæk. The paper was a four-page publication. It focused on small government and classical liberal politics. It went defunct in 1879.
