= Øyene =

Norwegian newspaper

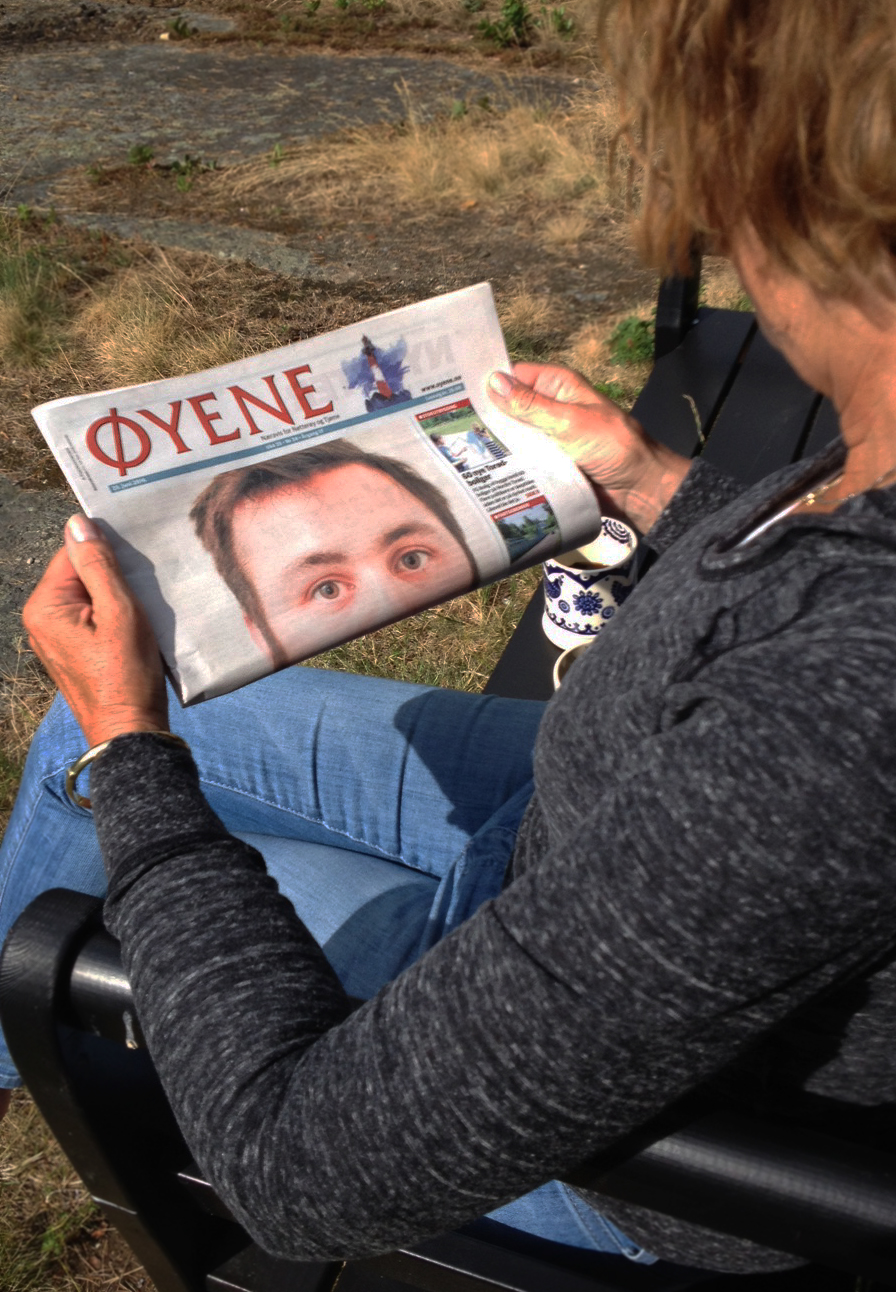
Øyene, June 2016

Øyene (lit. 'the Islands') is a local Norwegian newspaper published in Færder Municipality in Vestfold county.

Øyene is published once a week, on Thursdays, and covers events in Færder Municipality. It is politically independent and was established in 1999. The newspaper's office is in Teie. It is edited by Tor Aslesen. Øyene was named Norway's Local Newspaper of the Year (Årets lokalavis) in 2006 and 2007.

== Circulation ==
According to the Norwegian Audit Bureau of Circulations and National Association of Local Newspapers, Øyene has had the following annual circulation:

- 2006: 4,087
- 2007: 4,295
- 2008: 4,404
- 2009: 4,326
- 2010: 4,311
- 2011: 4,277
- 2012: 4,011
- 2013: 3,802
- 2014: 3,623
- 2015: 3,570
- 2016: 3,473
- 2017: 3,601
