= Zeitzer Landspiegel =

East german communist newspaper

Zeitzer Landspiegel ('Zeitz Country Mirror') was a newspaper published from Zeitz, German Democratic Republic 1960–1961. It functioned as the organ of the District Leadership of the Socialist Unity Party of Germany for Kreis Zeitz. The newspaper was succeeded by Zeitzer Rundblick in early 1962.
