= Follo (newspaper) =

Norwegian newspaper

Follo was a Norwegian newspaper, published in Ski in Akershus county, and named after the district Follo. It was affiliated with the Norwegian Labour Party. From 1947 to 1953 it was named Follo Arbeiderblad.

It was established in 1929, and stopped in 1940 at the advent of the German occupation of Norway. It resurfaced as Follo Arbeiderblad on 7 October 1947, then changed its name to Follo in May 1953. In 1957, Follo was absorbed into another Labour Party newspaper, Moss og Omegn Arbeiderblad, which was then published under the new name Moss Dagblad.
