= Nedenes Amts Landbotidende =

Norwegian newspaper

Nedenes Amts Landbotidende was a Norwegian newspaper, published in Arendal in Aust-Agder county.

Nedenes Amts Landbotidende was started in 1879. It went defunct in 1903.
