= Søndenfjeldske Avis =

Norwegian newspaper

Søndenfjeldske Avis was a Norwegian newspaper, published in Kristiansand in Vest-Agder county.

Søndenfjeldske Avis was started in 1892. It went defunct in 1903.
