= Haugesunds Social-Demokrat =

Norwegian newspaper

Haugesunds Social-Demokrat was a Norwegian newspaper, published in Haugesund in Rogaland county. It was affiliated with the Social Democratic Labour Party of Norway.

Haugesunds Social-Demokrat was started in 1921, the same year the Social Democratic Labour Party broke away from the Norwegian Labour Party. In 1926, Haugesunds Social-Demokrat was incorporated into the Labour Party newspaper Haugesunds Arbeiderblad. In 1927, the Social Democratic Labour Party reconciled with the Labour Party, and the two parties again became one.
