= Bergens Aftenblad =

Norwegian daily newspaper

Bergens Aftenblad was a Norwegian daily newspaper, published in Bergen, Norway from 1880 to 1942.

== History and profile ==
The paper was started in 1880, and absorbed the long-running Bergens Adressecontoirs Efterretninger in 1889.

The Nazis took over the paper in January 1942 and closed it on 21 April 1942. It did not return when the German occupation of Norway ended in 1945. Instead, the publishing rights were bought by Morgenavisen, another Conservative Party paper.
