= Skiptvet =

Skiptvet Municipality Skiptvet kommune
- Municipality
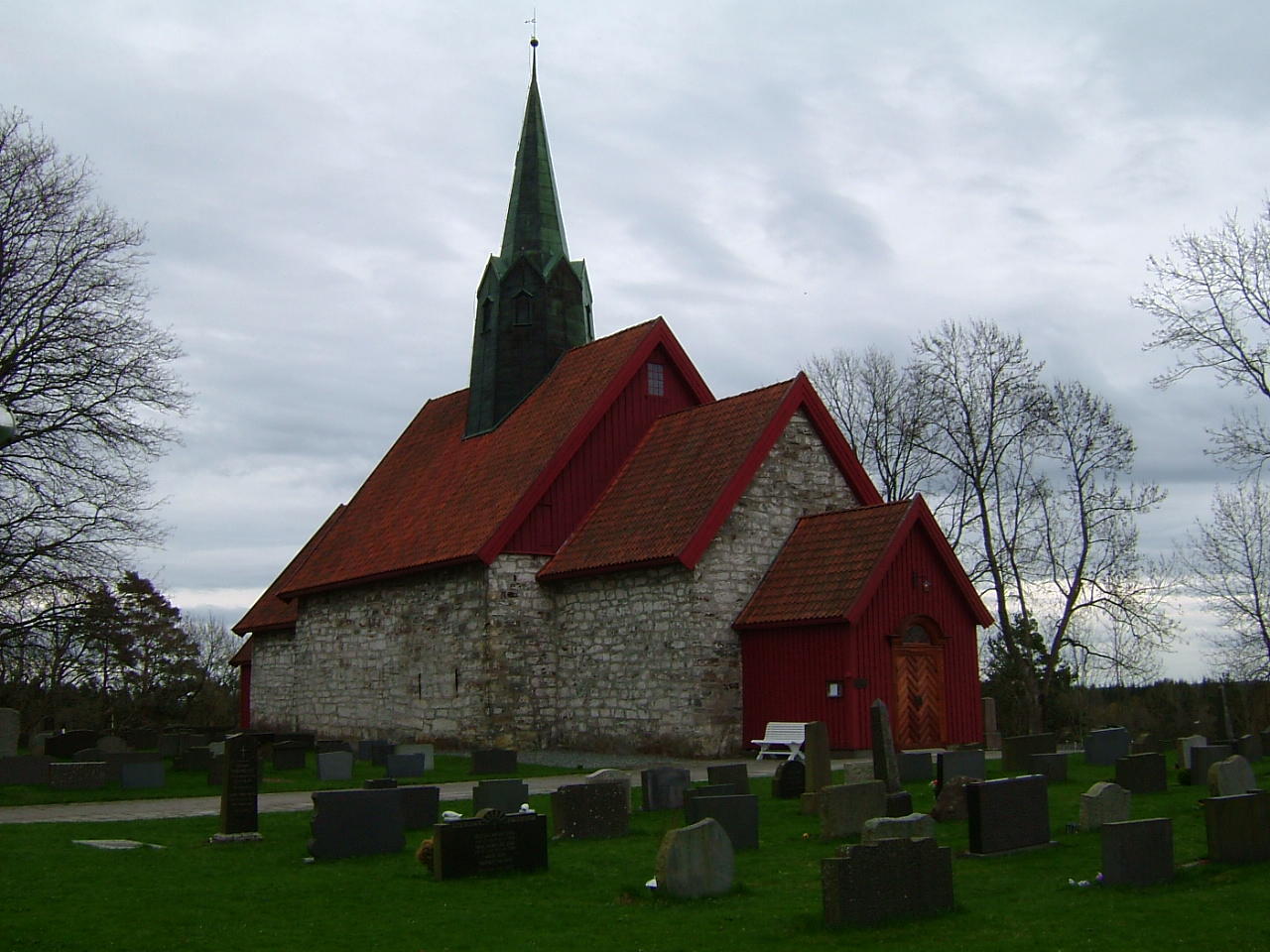
- Skiptvet church

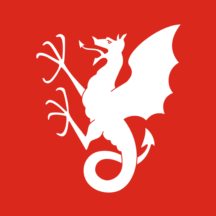
- Flag Coat of arms

- Østfold within Norway

- Skiptvet within Østfold
- Coordinates: 59°28′50″N 11°8′40″E
- Country: Norway
- County: Østfold
- Administrative centre: Meieribyen

Government
  - Mayor (2007): Svein Olav Agnalt (Ap)

Area
  - Total: 101 km^{2} (39 sq mi)
  - Land: 93 km^{2} (36 sq mi)
  - Rank: #384 in Norway

Population (2004)
  - Total: 3,336
  - Rank: #251 in Norway
  - Density: 36/km^{2} (93/sq mi)
  - Change (10 years): ▲ +8.7%
- Demonym: Skjetving

Official language
  - Norwegian form: Bokmål
- Time zone: UTC+01:00 (CET)
  - Summer (DST): UTC+02:00 (CEST)
- ISO 3166 code: NO-3116
- Website: Official website

Skiptvet is a municipality in Østfold county, Norway. The administrative centre of the municipality is the village of Meieribyen. Skiptvet was established as a municipality on 1 January 1838 (see formannskapsdistrikt).

== General information ==
=== Name ===
The municipality (originally the parish) is named after the old Skiptvet farm (Old Norse: Skipþveit and/or Skygþveit) because the first church was built here. The meaning of the first element(s) is not known, and the last element is þveit 'clearing in the woods'. Prior to 1889, the name was written Skibtvet.

=== Coat-of-arms ===
The coat-of-arms is from modern times. They were granted on 27 November 1981. The arms show a silver dragon on a red background. The dragon is derived from a local legend, in which a dragon went to sleep in the local churchyard every morning. In the evening the dragon went back to the forest, where it had its lair. A tarn near the church is still called Dragehullet, meaning "the dragon's pit".

Number of minorities (1st and 2nd generation) in Skiptvet by country of origin in 2015
Ancestry	Number
Poland	124
Syria	32
Lithuania	27
Latvia	27
Sweden	23

== Notable people ==
- Jens Christian Spidberg (1684 in Skiptvet - 1762) cartographer, theologian, priest and Bishop of the Diocese of Agder og Telemark
