= Skotfos Avis =

Norwegian newspaper

Skotfos Avis was a Norwegian newspaper, published in Skotfoss in Telemark county.

Skotfos Avis was started on 1 October 1901, and was somewhat special in its time in that it was an apolitical newspaper, designed to be the local newspaper of Skotfoss. It was owned from 1921 on by the local company Skotfoss Bruk, which demanded this apolitical attitude. The best-known editor-in-chief was Emanuel Sørensen, who served from 1901 to 1919. The newspaper went defunct on 8 March 1930, mainly because Skotfoss became more connected to the city Skien, and Skien's larger newspapers became more widely read.
