= Karmsundsposten =

Former Norwegian newspaper

Karmsundsposten was a Norwegian newspaper, published in Haugesund in Rogaland county, Norway.

== History ==
Karmsundsposten was started in 1861, as the first newspaper in the middle-sized city. It took its name from the Karmsundet strait between Haugesund and Karmøy island. In 1915, it was absorbed by the Labour Party newspaper Haugesunds Folkeblad.
