= Lokalposten =

Norwegian newspaper

Lokalposten was a local newspaper published in Rakkestad, Norway.

== History and profile ==
The newspaper was first published on 4 January 1930, and had no formal political affiliation. In 1941, during the occupation of Norway by Nazi Germany, the Germans amalgamated it with the newspaper Rakkestad Avis, which was then published under the name Østfold Bygdeblad.
