= Rakkestad Avis =

Norwegian newspaper

- Type: Three days a week
- Owner(s): A-pressen
- Editor: Elin Marie Rud
- Founded: 1912
- Political alignment: Independent
- Headquarters: Storgata 8, 1890 Rakkestad
- Circulation: 2,515 (2013)
- Website: www.r-a.no

Rakkestad Avis is a local newspaper published in Rakkestad, Norway.

== History and profile ==
The newspaper was started on 16 September 1912. It was published as Østfold Bygdeblad in Mysen from 1941 to 1986. The paper was affiliated with the Liberal Party, then the Norwegian Agrarian Association/Agrarian Party after 1920. Officially it was apolitical until 1936.

In 1941, during the occupation of Norway by Nazi Germany, the Germans amalgamated it with the newspaper Lokalposten, and gave it the name Østfold Bygdeblad from 2 April 1941. The newspaper was eventually moved to Mysen, but it was moved back as the name reverted to Rakkestad Avis from 2 January 1987. It is published three days a week. A competitor from 2002 to 2008 Rakkestad Bygdeblad tried to publish on three other days of the week, but succumbed.

Rakkestad Avis is now published by the company Rakkestad Avis AS, which is owned 100% by A-pressen. The paper had a circulation of about 1,842 copies in 1963. The 2013 circulation of the paper was 2,515 copies.
