= Samleren =

Norwegian newspaper

Samleren was a Norwegian newspaper, published in Mandal, Norway. It was a continuation of the periodical Den Lille Samler. It was started in 1909 and went defunct in 1960.
