= Leobschützer Kreisblatt =

Weekly local newspaper

- Type: weekly local newspaper
- Publisher: W. Wittkes Buchdruckerei
- Founded: 1843
- Language: German; German-Polish from 1920
- Ceased publication: 1922, 1939 or 1944
- Circulation: 2.000 (1885)

Leobschützer Kreisblatt (lit.: Leobschütz District Paper) was a weekly local newspaper based in the Leobschütz District in the south-west of the Oppeln Region.

The Leobschützer Kreisblatt was printed by W. Wittkes Buchdruckerei and co-published by the Der Landrat. Red.. Printing commenced in 1843.

In 1920 the Leobschützer Kreisblatt underwent crucial changes, such as simplification of its logo and the transition from an exclusively German newspaper over to a split-page bilingual German-Polish newspaper, perhaps in relation to the Upper Silesian Plebiscite. This new format was upheld until the magazine's discontinuation in 1922.
