= Grømstad-Posten =

Norwegian newspaper

The Grømstad-Posten was a Norwegian newspaper, published in Grimstad in Agder county.

The paper was started in 1884 as Andvake before being renamed the Grømstad-Posten in 1887. It ceased publication in 1904, but was revived in 1945 before folding permanently in 1951.
