= Kopervik Tidende =

Norwegian newspaper

Kopervik Tidende was a Norwegian newspaper, published in Kopervik on the island of Karmøy in Rogaland county.

Kopervik Tidende was started in 1912. It went defunct in 1931.
