= Lister og Mandals Amtstidende =

Norwegian newspaper

Lister og Mandals Amtstidende was a Norwegian newspaper, published in Mandal.

Lister og Mandals Amtstidende was started in 1909 as Lister og Mandals Amtstidende og Adresseavis. Its name was changed in 1914. Lister og Mandals Amtstidende became defunct in 1919.
