= Karmøy-Posten =

Defunct Norwegian newspaper

Karmøy-Posten was a Norwegian newspaper, published in Karmøy in Rogaland county.

Karmøy-Posten was started in 1911. In 1939 it was absorbed by Haugesund-based newspaper Haugesunds Dagblad.
