= Kristiansands Stiftsavis og Adressekontors-Efterretninger =

Norwegian newspaper

Kristiansands Stiftsavis og Adressekontors-Efterretninger was a Norwegian newspaper, published in Kristiansand in Vest-Agder county.

Kristiansands Stiftsavis og Adressekontors-Efterretninger was started in 1790 as Christianssands Adresse-Contors Efterretninger. It stopped in 1838, but returned under a new name in 1839. It went defunct in 1896.
