= Haugaland Arbeiderblad =

Newspaper related to the Norwegian Labour Party

Haugaland Arbeiderblad was a Norwegian newspaper, published in Haugesund in Rogaland county. It was affiliated with the Norwegian Labour Party.

Haugaland Arbeiderblad was started in 1907 under the name Arbeiderbladet. It stopped in 1908, but returned in 1910. The same year its name was changed to Haugesunds Folkeblad. In 1915 it absorbed the newspaper Karmsundsposten, and in 1926 it absorbed the newspaper Haugesunds Social-Demokrat and changed its name to Haugesunds Arbeiderblad. In 1931 its name was changed to Haugarland Arbeiderblad, and finally in 1939 to Haugaland Arbeiderblad. It was stopped between 1941 and 1945, during the German occupation of Norway. After the occupation, it resumed production, but struggled in competition with other local newspapers and went defunct in 1955. It was merged with Stavanger-based 1ste Mai to form Rogalands Avis.
