= Fosna-Arbeideren =

Former Norwegian newspaper

Fosna-Arbeideren was a Norwegian newspaper, published in Kristiansund in Møre og Romsdal county.

Fosna-Arbeideren was started on 21 December 1926 as the Communist Party organ in the Nordmøre region. It was published weekly, except for a period in 1928 when it was published twice a week. The newspaper ceased after its last issue on 25 May 1929.
