= Bergens Adressecontoirs Efterretninger =

Norwegian newspaper (1765–1889)

The first issue of Bergens Adressecontoirs Efterretninger, published on 4 February 1765

Bergens Adressecontoirs Efterretninger was a Norwegian newspaper, published in Bergen county.

Bergens Adressecontoirs Efterretninger was started in 1765. It went defunct in 1889, when it was incorporated into Bergens Aftenblad.
