= Karmøens Tidende =

Norwegian newspaper

Karmøens Tidende was a Norwegian newspaper, published in Karmøy in Rogaland county.

Karmøens Tidende was started in 1904. It went defunct in 1916.
