= Demokraten =

Local newspaper in Fredrikstad, Norway

- Format: Tabloid
- Owner: A-pressen
- Editor: Tomm Pentz Pedersen
- Founded: 1906
- Political alignment: Labour Party; Social Democratic (1921-1927); Non-partisan
- Headquarters: Fredrikstad, Norway
- Circulation: 8,659
- Website: www.demokraten.no

Demokraten ("The Democrat") is a local newspaper in Fredrikstad, Norway. Second in its city behind Fredriksstad Blad, it is published three days a week. The chief editor is Tomm Pentz Pedersen.

It was established in 1906 as Smaalenenes Social-Demokrat, being affiliated with the Labour Party. Its founder and editor until 1909 was Hans Andreas Hanssen. In 1921, when the Social Democratic Labour Party broke away from the Labour Party, Smaalenenes Social-Demokrat followed the new party. In 1927 the Social Democratic Labour Party reconciled with the Labour Party, and the two parties again became one. The name Demokraten was taken in 1945, and the newspaper ultimately became non-partisan. In 2001, facing local competition, the number of issues per week was cut from six to five. It was later cut to three.

It has a circulation of 8,659, of whom 8,528 are subscribers.

It is published by Demokraten AS, which is owned 100% by A-pressen.
