= Stavanger Avis =

Norwegian newspaper

Stavanger Avis was a Norwegian newspaper, published in Stavanger in Rogaland county. Its allegiance was Liberal.

Stavanger Avis was started in 1888 as Rogalands Folkeblad, its name changed in 1889. The first editors were Oddmund Vik and Alexander Kielland. In 1899 the newspaper absorbed a competitor, Stavangeren.

Vik left the position as chief editor in 1908. The new editor, Lars Kleiveland took a stance against temperance and prohibition. The populace did not take kindly to this, and Stavanger Avis went defunct in 1911, survived by a competing Liberal newspaper Stavanger Aftenblad which still exists.
