= Odda Nyhetsblad =

Norwegian newspaper

- Occupation: Businessman

Odda Nyhetsblad was a Norwegian newspaper, published in Odda in Vestland county.

Odda Nyhetsblad was started in 1925 by Andreas Bjelland, who was the newspaper's only chief editor; he had formerly published the newspaper Sandheden from 1909 to 1910. Odda Nyhetsblad was closed in 1940, returned in 1945 but went defunct in 1946.
