= Lister (newspaper) =

Norwegian newspaper

Lister was a Norwegian newspaper, published in Farsund in Agder county.

Lister was started in 1878. It stopped in 1881, but returned in 1883. Lister finally went defunct in 1934.
