= Øvre Smaalenene =

Norwegian newspaper

Øvre Smaalenene was a Norwegian newspaper, published in Askim in Østfold county.

It was established as Askims Avis on 7 May 1902, but changed its name to Øvre Smaalenene (modern: "Upper Østfold") in 1903. The first year it was published by Ole Lingjærde and Fredrik Maseng with a Liberal Party affiliation. It was mainly politically independent after that. and in addition to Askim it also covered the municipalities of Spydeberg, Hobøl and Enebakk.

Its circulation was about 3,000 in the interwar period, then 4,933 in 1950, 6,460 in 1970 and 7,061 in 1983. In 1990, it absorbed the somewhat smaller Østfold-Posten, because both newspapers were bought by A-pressen, and the circulation rose to 9,505. In 1997, it merged with the Mysen-based newspaper Indre Smaalenenes Avis, which continued, from 2003 under the name Smaalenenes Avis. However, the newspaper was moved back to Askim.
