= NS Månedshefte =

Norwegian periodical

NS Månedshefte ('NS Monthly Pamphlet') was a Norwegian periodical.

It was published on a monthly basis from 1941 to 1945 by the Nazi party Nasjonal Samling (NS), which held power during the German occupation of Norway. It contained ideological topics and political commentary. It was edited by Gunnar Næss and later Einar Syvertsen.
