= Krossen =

Village in Lindesnes Municipality, Norway

Krossen Holum
- Village
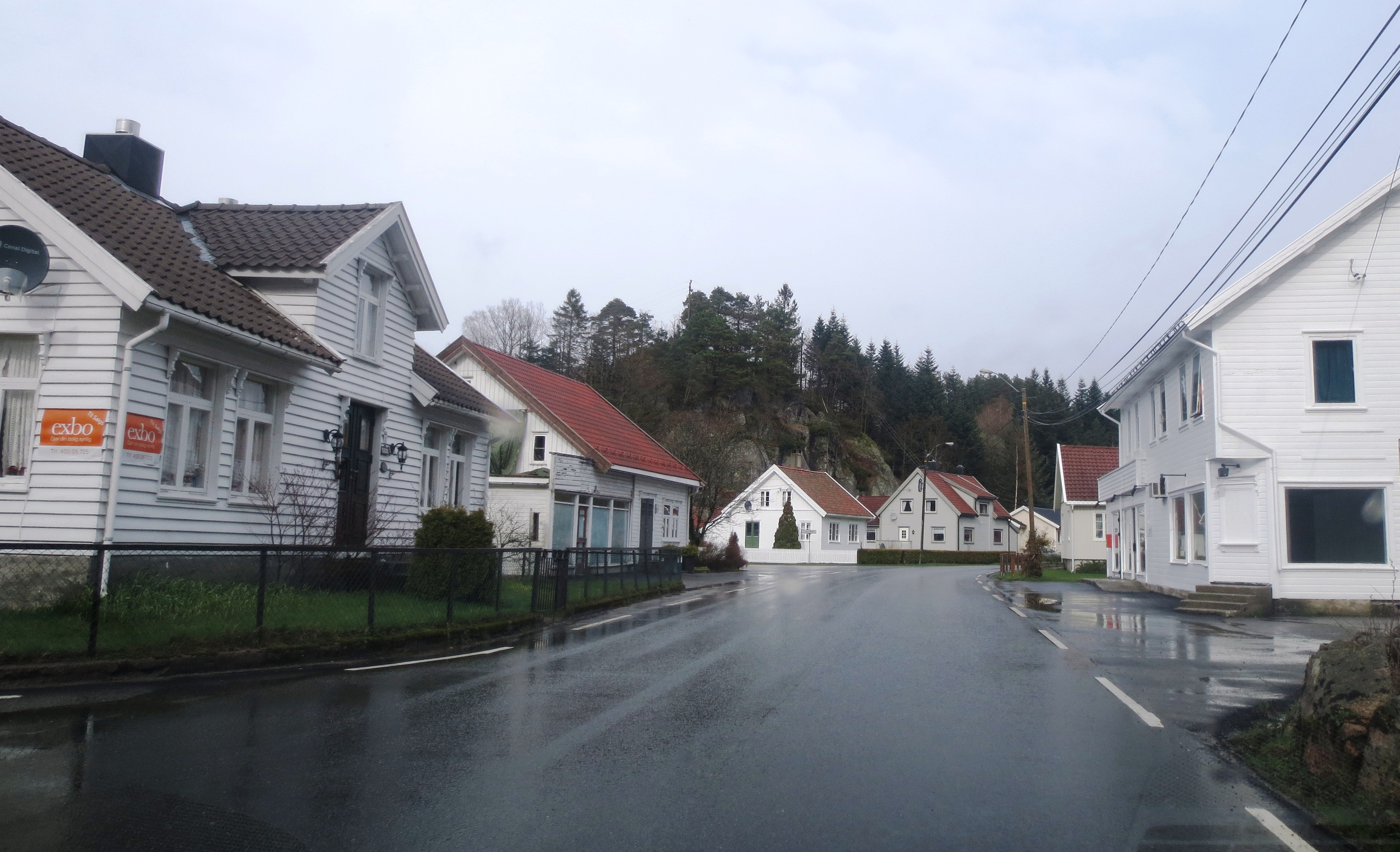
- View of the village
- Interactive map of Krossen
- Coordinates: 58.09698°N 7.52535°E
- Country: Norway
- Region: Southern Norway
- County: Agder
- Municipality: Lindesnes Municipality

Area
  - Total: 0.49 km^{2} (0.19 sq mi)
- Elevation: 16 m (52 ft)

Population (2025)
  - Total: 619
  - Density: 1,263/km^{2} (3,270/sq mi)
- Time zone: UTC+01:00 (CET)
  - Summer (DST): UTC+02:00 (CEST)
- Post Code: 4519 Holum

Krossen is a village in Lindesnes Municipality in Agder county, Norway. The village is located in the Mandalen valley, on the western shore of the river Mandalselva, about 10 kilometres (6.2 mi) north of the town of Mandal and about 9 kilometres (5.6 mi) south of the village of Øyslebø.

The 0.49-square-kilometre (120-acre) village has a population (2025) of 619 and a population density of 1,263 inhabitants per square kilometre (3,270/sq mi).

== History ==
The village (also known as Holum) was the administrative centre of the old Holum Municipality which existed from 1838 until its dissolution in 1964. Holum Church, built in 1825, is located in Krossen.
