= Norsk-Tysk Tidsskrift =

Norwegian periodical

Norsk-Tysk Tidsskrift (English: Norwegian-German Journal) was a Norwegian periodical, in existence during the German occupation of Norway.

It was published on a monthly basis from 1942 by the Norwegian-German cultural society Norsk-Tysk Selskap. Publication stopped after the liberation of Norway in 1945, when Norsk-Tysk Selskap was disbanded.
