= Mülhauser Volksblatt =

German newspaper

Mülhauser Volksblatt was a daily newspaper published from Mulhouse, Alsace-Lorraine, Germany. It was the first Catholic daily newspaper in Mulhouse. Mülhauser Volksblatt was founded in 1892 by Henri Cetty, and rapidly became popular.

Mülhauser Volksblatt was banned in 1897, after having protested against the official birthday celebrations of the Emperor.
