= Tvedestrand og Omegns Avis =

Norwegian newspaper

Tvedestrand og Omegns Avis was a Norwegian newspaper, published in Tvedestrand in Agder county.

Tvedestrand og Omegns Avis was started in 1902. It stopped in 1940, but returned in 1945. It went defunct in 1948.

The newspaper once rivalled the Tvedestrandsposten in the mid-1900s, providing a conservative response to its progressive counterpart. It is reported that Arne Garborg, a founder of Tvedestrandsposten, was concerned of its growth as a newspaper associated with the Conservative Party.
