= Rogalands Avis =

Norwegian local newspaper

- Type: Daily newspaper
- Owner(s): A-pressen
- Editor: Harald Minge
- Founded: 1899; 126 years ago
- Political alignment: Labour
- Ceased publication: 3. February 2024
- Circulation: 8,471 (2012)
- Website: www.rogavis.no

Rogalands Avis was a local newspaper published in Stavanger, Norway.

== History and profile ==
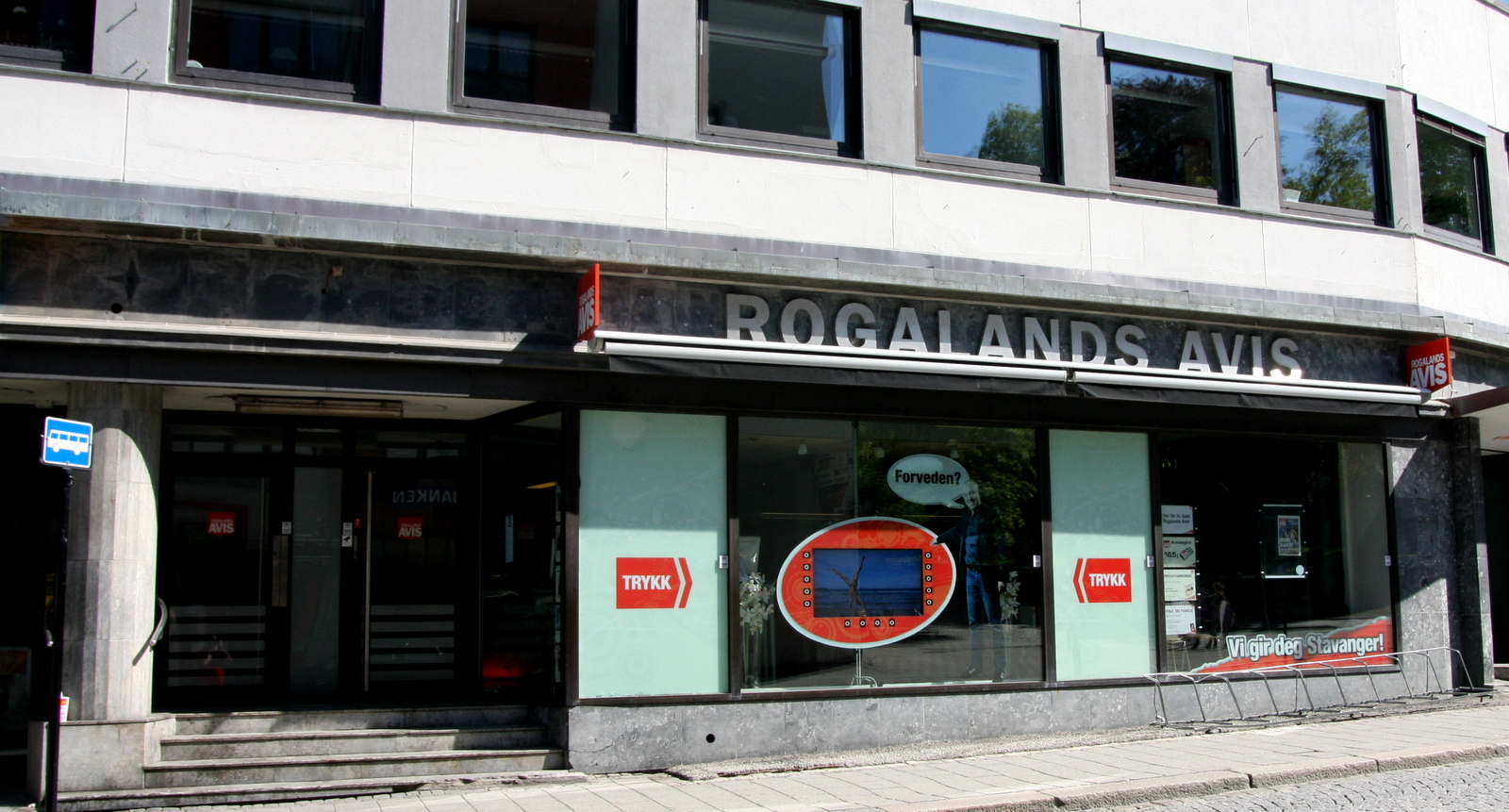
Rogalands Avis building in Stavanger

Rogalands Avis was established in 1899. The paper was based in Stavanger and covers the southern Rogaland.

A Labour Party-affiliated newspaper, it was titled 1ste Mai until 1955, when it absorbed the bankrupt Haugaland Arbeiderblad. Notable former editors-in-chief include Johan Gjøstein, Cornelius Holmboe (1908–1909), Otto Luihn, Hans Andreas Hanssen (1919–1920), Børge Olsen-Hagen (1920–1936), Trond Hegna (1940–1958), Engwall Pahr-Iversen (1978-1990), Norulv Øvrebotten (1990-1996) and Lars Helle (1996-2000). Rogalands Avis was owned 95.8% by A-pressen Lokale Medier AS, which in turn is owned 100% by A-pressen.

Rogalands Avis had a circulation of 13,276 copies in 2006 and there were 10,521 subscribers the same year. In 2009 its circulation was 10,500 copies. The circulation of the paper was 8,471 copies in 2012.

On January 25, 2024, it was decided that Rogalands Avis would be shut down after previous attempts to sell the newspaper were unsuccessful.

The final issue of the newspaper was published on February 3, 2024.
