= Amedia =

Norwegian media company

Amedia AS
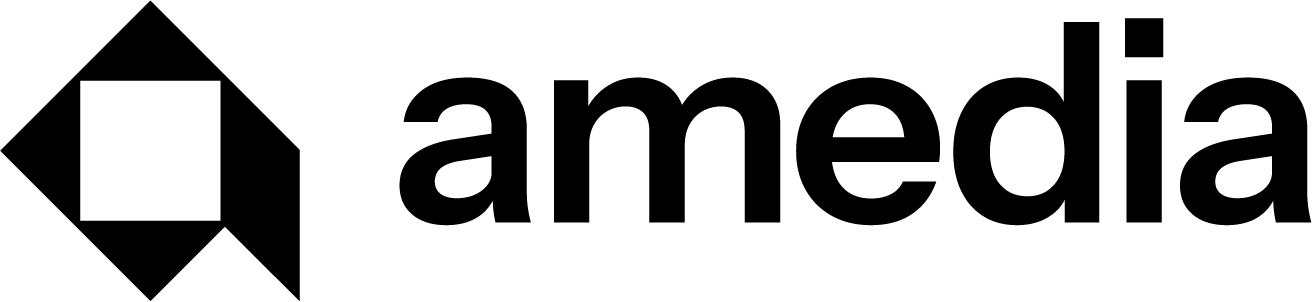
- Type: Private
- Industry: Media
- Founded: 1948
- Headquarters: Oslo, Norway
- Area served: Norway, Denmark and Sweden
- Key people: Anders Opdahl (CEO)
- Revenue: 4,000,000,000 (2024)
- Number of employees: 2,380 (2024)
- Parent: Amediastiftelsen
- Website: www.amedia.no

Amedia AS is a Norwegian media group owned by the Amedia Foundation and is considered the country’s largest newspaper publisher.

As of 2025, the group had more than 100 local, regional and national titles, in addition to 20 partner newspapers in Norway. Amedia acquired the Danish media house Berlingske Media in 2024 and in October 2025, Amedia and Berlingske Media entered into a cross-ownership agreement with the Danish media group JFM. The company also holds a share in the Swedish media company Bonnier.

Amedia was established in 2012 through a merger of the media groups A-Pressen and Edda Media. Ownership has changed several times, including in 2016 when Sparebankstiftelsen DNB took over ownership from the Norwegian Confederation of Trade Unions (LO), Telenor and the Freedom of Expression Foundation (Fritt Ord), and subsequently established the Amedia Foundation as the new owner.

The group previously operated printing activities in Russia, but transferred these in 2022 to editor Dmitry Muratov and the newspaper Novaya Gazeta.

As of 2025, the chief executive officer of Amedia is Anders Opdahl, while André Støylen is director of the Amedia Foundation and chair of Amedia’s board.

== Newspapers ==
- Avisen Agder
- Akershus Amtstidende
- Arbeidets Rett
- Aura Avis
- Aust Agder Blad
- Avisa Oslo
- Avisa Nordland
- BodøBy.no
- Bergensavisen
- Bygdebladet
- Bygdeposten
- Dalane Tidende
- Drammens Tidende
- Eikerbladet
- Enebakk Avis
- Fanaposten
- Finnmark Dagblad
- Finnmarken
- Finnmarksposten
- Firda
- Firdaposten
- Fredriksstad Blad
- Fremover
- Gjengangeren
- Gjesdalbuen
- Glåmdalen
- Hadeland
- Halden Arbeiderblad
- Hardanger Folkeblad
- Helgelendingen
- Haugesunds Avis
- Indre Akershus Blad
- iFinnmark
- iSandnessjøen
- Jarlsberg
- Jærbladet
- Kragerø Blad Vestmar
- Kvinnheringen
- KRS
- Laagendalsposten
- Lierposten
- Lofotposten
- Lofot-Tidende
- Lyngdals Avis
- Moss Avis
- Nettavisen
- Nidaros
- Nordhordland
- Nordlys
- Senja 247
- Nordstrands Blad
- Oppland Arbeiderblad
- Toten Idag
- Porsgrunns Dagblad
- Rakkestad Avis
- Rana Blad
- Ringerikes Blad
- Ringsaker Blad
- Rjukan Arbeiderblad
- Romerikes Blad
- MittJessheim
- MittLillestrøm
- MittLørenskog
- Sandefjords Blad
- Sandnesposten
- Sarpsborg Arbeiderblad
- Smaalenenes Avis
- Sogn Avis
- Solabladet
- SolungAvisa
- Strandbuen
- Svelviksposten
- Sydvesten
- Telemarksavisa
- Telen
- Tidens Krav
- Tvedestrandsposten
- Tønsbergs Blad
- Vestviken 24
- Varingen
- Vaksdalposten
- Vestby Avis
- Østlandets Blad
- Østlands-Posten
- Østlendingen
- Øyene
- Ås Avis
- Åsane Tidende
- Avisa Hordaland
- Kronstadposten
- RA Stavanger
- Nationen
- Karmøynytt
- iHarstad
- Hammerfestingen
- Sør-Varanger Avis
- Akersposten
- Bodø Nu
- Rana No
- Bondebladet
- Norsk Landbruk
- Traktor
- Sagene Avis
- Nordre Aker Budstikke
- Gaula
- Budstikka
- Røyken og Hurums Avis
- Sande Avis

== Amedia's Danish titles ==
- Berlingske
- B.T.
- Weekendavisen
- Euroinvestor

== Amedia's partner titles ==
- Bladet Vesterålen
- Drangedalsposten
- Eidsvoll Ullensaker Blad
- Frostingen
- Gudbrandsdølen Dagningen
- Hamar Arbeiderblad
- iLevanger
- Inderøyningen
- iVerdal
- Lokalavisa Trysil-Engerdal
- Meråkerposten
- Namdalsavisa
- Norddalen
- Nye Troms
- Raumnes
- Snåsningen
- Stangeavisa
- Steinkjer-Avisa
- Trønder-Avisa
- Valdres
