= Anders Opdahl =

Norwegian media executive

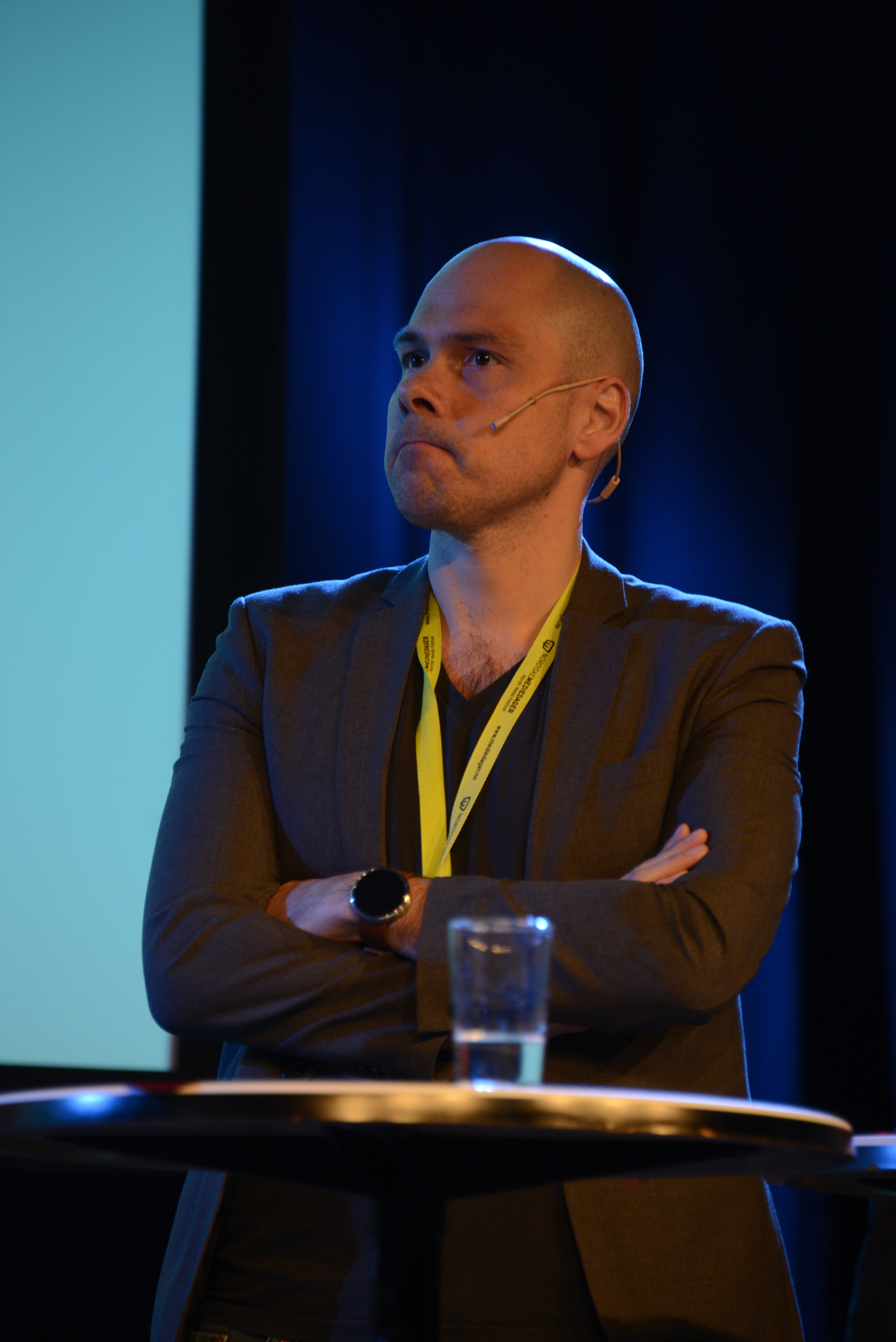
- Born: 20 March 1979 (age 47); Lakselv, Norway
- Occupations: journalist, newspaper editor and media executive
- Employer: Amedia

Anders Opdahl (born 20 March 1979) is a Norwegian journalist, newspaper editor and media executive. He was editor-in-chief of the newspaper Nordlys from 2011 to 2016, and has been chief executive officer of Amedia since 2020.

== Biography ==
Opdahl was born in Lakselv on 20 March 1979. He has worked as journalist for the newspaper Finnmark Dagblad, the news agency Avisenes Nyhetsbyrå, and Dagbladet. From 2005 to 2011 he was assigned as news editor for the newspaper Nordlys.

He was appointed editor-in-chief of Nordlys from 2011 to 2016, and thereafter manager in the media company Amedia. He was appointed CEO of Amedia from 2020.

Media offices
| Preceded by Hans Kristian Amundsen | Chief editor of Nordlys; 2011–2016 | Succeeded by Helge Nitteberg |
