= Sondre =

Sondre is a Norwegian masculine given name. The name began to become more common in the 1960s, and became roughly twelve times as popular from 1980 to 1990 before declining in popularity thereafter. As of 2017, there were 9,111 men in Norway with Sondre as part of their forename, and 8,092 with Sondre as their only forename. People with this name include:

== Musicians ==
- Sondre Bratland (born 1938), Norwegian folk singer
- Sondre Meisfjord (born 1975), Norwegian folk and jazz musician
- Sondre Lerche (born 1982), Norwegian singer, songwriter, and guitarist
- Sondre Justad (born 1990), Norwegian songwriter

== Footballers ==
- Sondre Auklend (born 2003), Norwegian football midfielder
- Sondre Bjørshol (born 1994), Norwegian football defender
- Sondre Brunstad Fet (born 1997), Norwegian football midfielder
- Sondre Granaas (born 2006), Norwegian football midfielder
- Sondre Jensen (born 1971), Norwegian footballer
- Sondre Johansen (born 1995), Norwegian football defender
- Sondre Kåfjord (born 1943), Norwegian football official
- Sondre Langås (born 2001), Norwegian football defender
- Sondre Liseth (born 1997), Norwegian football forward
- Sondre Rossbach (born 1996), Norwegian football goalkeeper
- Sondre Sørli (born 1995), Norwegian football midfielder
- Sondre Sørløkk (born 1997), Norwegian football midfielder
- Sondre Tronstad (born 1995), Norwegian football midfielder

== Other sportspeople ==
- Sondre Norheim (1825–1897), Norwegian skier
- Sondre Nordstad Moen (born 1991), Norwegian long distance runner
- Sondre Olden (born 1992), Norwegian ice hockey player
- Sondre Holst Enger (born 1993), Norwegian cyclist
- Sondre Turvoll Fossli (born 1993), Norwegian cross-country skier
- Sondre Ringen (born 1996), Norwegian ski jumper
- Sondre Oddvoll Bøe (born 1998), Norwegian figure skater
- Sondre Guttormsen (born 1999), Norwegian pole vaulter
- Sondre Slettemark (born 2004), Greenlandic biathlete

== See also ==
- Håkon, Kristin and Sondre, the mascots of the 1994 Winter Olympics and 1994 Winter Paralympics
