= Odd Flattum =

Norwegian politician (1942–2024)

Odd Flattum (9 August 1942 – 25 November 2024) was a Norwegian sports official and politician for the Labour Party. He was best known as editor-in-chief of Bygdeposten from 1979 to 1991, mayor of Modum from 1991 to 2007 and president of the Norwegian Football Association from 1992 to 1995.

== Life and career ==
Flattum grew up between Vikersund and Geithus as a son of a railway worker. He played for Geithus IL as a youngster, but represented Vikersund IF as an adult. He took over the family farm Flattum in the late 1980s.

He started his professional career as a teacher immediately after finishing the examen artium. After three years at Stalsberg school in Geithus, he attended Eik Teachers' College. He worked in Porsgrunn upon graduating before returning to Vikersund.

In 1971 he entered politics, as a municipal council candidate for the Labour Party. He was given the job as editor-in-chief of the local newspaper Bygdeposten in 1979, working there until 1991, concurrent with his political career. He took over as mayor of Modum in 1991 following the illness of sitting mayor Egil Ranheim. Being formally elected in 1991, 1995, 1999 and 2003, his mayoral period spanned until 2007, when he left local politics after 36 years. He served as a deputy representative to the Norwegian Parliament from Buskerud during the terms 1981–1985 and 1985–1989.

Flattum also entered sports administration. In 1980 he was elected vice president of the Football Association of Norway (NFF). He left in 1985, but returned in 1987. In 1992, he advanced to president. Serving until 1996, he presided over Norway's first modern-time qualification to the FIFA World Cup, as well as the victory in the 1995 FIFA Women's World Cup. In 1996 he left the NFF to become vice president of the Norwegian Confederation of Sports, serving until 2004. He was also vice president of the Norwegian Chess Federation from 1998 to 2000. As a player of postal chess, he won the national team tournament in 1974. He held the golden badge of the Football Association and honorary membership in the Norwegian Confederation of Sports, and lastly served as a UEFA delegate to football matches until the year he turned 70.

Flattum was also a board member of Norsk Tipping and Ullevaal Stadium. Locally, he held board memberships in Blaafarveværket, Modum FK and Vikersundbakken. He was also an announcer during the Vikersundbakken ski events for 20 years. Flattum died at Ringerike Hospital on 25 November 2024, at the age of 82.

Sporting positions
Preceded by Per Ravn Omdal	President of the Norwegian Football Association; 1992–1996	Succeeded by Per Ravn Omdal
