= Tvedestrandsposten =

Local newspaper in Tvedestrand, Norway

- Type: Daily newspaper
- Owner(s): Østlands-Posten/ A-pressen
- Editor: Marianne Drivdal
- Founded: 1872
- Circulation: 3522
- Website: www.tvedestrandsposten.no

Tvedestrandsposten is a local newspaper published in Tvedestrand, Norway. It was established in 1872 by Arne Garborg.

It has a circulation of 3522, of whom 3383 are subscribers.

Tvedestrandsposten is published by Tvedestrand & Risør Holding AS, which is owned 75% by Østlands-Posten, which in turn is owned 100% by A-pressen.
