= Jarlsberg Avis =

Norwegian newspaper

- Type: Three days a week
- Owner(s): Østlands-Posten/ A-pressen
- Editor: Knut S. Evensen
- Founded: 1843
- Circulation: 3,982 (2013)
- Website: www.jarlsbergavis.no

Jarlsberg Avis is a local newspaper published in Holmestrand, Norway.

== History and profile ==
Jarlsberg Avis was established in 1843. The paper is owned by Østlands-Posten, which in turn is owned 100% by A-pressen.

In 2006 Jarlsberg Avis had a circulation of 3,647 copies of which 3,499 were through subscription. The paper had a circulation of 3,982 copies in 2013.
