= Nordlys =

Norwegian newspaper

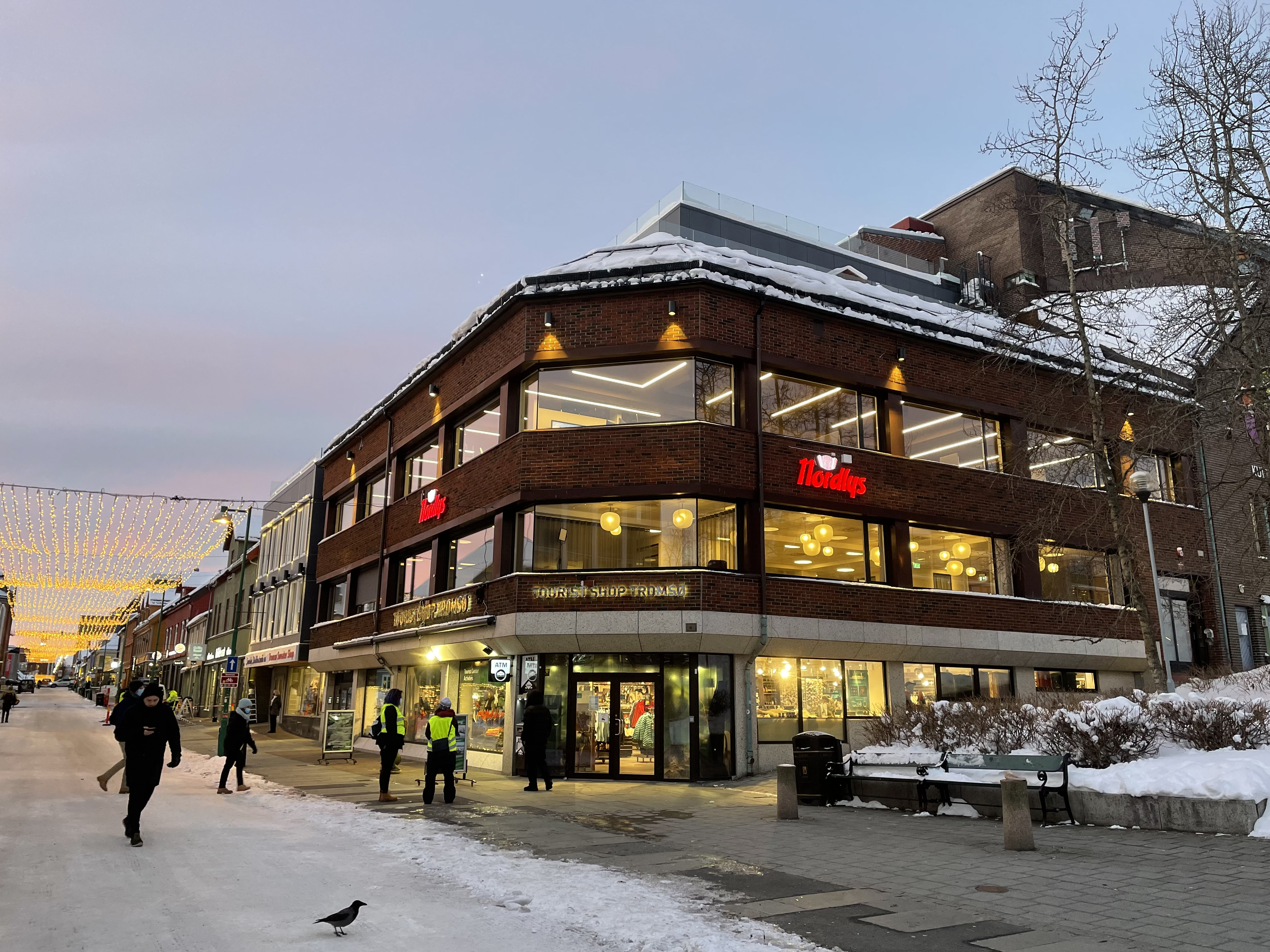
- Nordlys headquarters building in Tromsø
- Owner: Amedia
- Founder: Alfred Eriksen
- Founded: 1902; 124 years ago
- Headquarters: Tromsø
- Circulation: 26,000 (2009)
- Website: www.nordlys.no

Nordlys is a Norwegian newspaper published in Tromsø, covering the region of Troms, and the largest newspaper in Northern Norway. Since 2 January 2026, the newspaper published issues on Tuesdays, Thursdays and Saturdays.

== History and profile ==
Nordlys was founded in 1902 by Alfred Eriksen, who also was its first editor-in-chief. The majority owner of the paper is A-Pressen, until 2012, when A-Pressen was renamed Amedia. The paper is headquartered in Tromsø. It was an organ of the Labour Party.

Among the later editors are Ivan Kristoffersen, who edited the newspaper from 1982 to 1997, and Hans Kristian Amundsen who served in the position from 2001 to 2011.

Anders Opdahl served as chief editor from 2011 to 2016, and Helge Nitteberg has been chief editor since 2016.

Nordlys has been one of the major sponsors of the Tromsø International Film Festival since its inception in 1991.

The circulation of Nordlys was 28,000 copies in 2005. In 2008 the paper had a circulation of 26,714 copies. It was 26,000 copies in 2009.
