= Inderøyningen =

Norwegian newspaper

- Type: Weekly newspaper
- Format: Tabloid
- Owner: Trønder-Avisa
- Founder: Albert Collet
- Publisher: Inderøyningen AS
- Editor: Pia Marie Lerseth (2020–)
- Founded: 11 March 1993; 33 years ago
- Language: Norwegian
- Headquarters: Straumen
- City: Inderøy
- Country: Norway
- Circulation: 1,832 (as of 2023)
- Website: inderoyningen.no

Inderøyningen is a weekly, local, online and printed newspaper covering Inderøy Municipality in Trøndelag, Norway. It is published by Inderøyningen AS in the municipal center of Straumen. The newspaper was first published on 11 March 1993. It has since the mid-2000s been owned by the regional newspaper Trønder-Avisa.

== History ==
The initiative to establish Inderøyningen came from Albert Collett. In the early 1990s he was working for Trønder-Avisa as a journalist, including the responsibility for covering Snåsa. The free newspaper Snåsa-Posten had been launched in 1992. The locals regarded it having low quality, and asked Collett if he could take over the operation. Collett liked the idea of running a local newspaper, but believed there was not sufficient population in Snåsa to make it work financially. This would be proved wrong by the 1995 establishment of Snåsningen.

It quickly became clear for Collett that Inderøy was the largest municipality in Nord-Trøndelag without its own local newspaper. That he lived in neighboring Verdal was also an advantage. He visited Meråkerposten, who gladly showed him their operations and finances. He teamed up with three local investors: Jarl Foosnæs, Per Audun Letnes and Leif Terje Hastad. Based on population and experiences with other local newspapers, they belived it could make ends meet, but they had two main concers: first was that there were few large businesses in Inderøy targeted at consumers, and therefore limited prospects for advertisement income. The second was a concern that people living in the formerly independent municipalities of Sandvollan and Røra would be negative to the term Inderøyningen. Yet, the four agreed to launch the newspaper, and founded Inderøyningen AS with the four as equal owners on 16 December 1992. Shares were then offered to the public, for a total share capital of 150 thousand kroner. In addition, it was funded by start-up grants and loans from Inderøy Municipality and loans from Sparebanken Midt-Norge.

Collett was hired as editor and two more people were hired, one as an advertisement salesperson, and one as an accountant. The first issue was published on 11 March 1993. The first four issues were distributed for free to all households in Inderøy. In order to secured subscriptions, various volunteer organizations, such as sports clubs, were commissioned to sells subscriptions. By May the newspapper had 1000 subscribers, and 1400 by September. Subscription numbers were from then on rather stable, increasingly only gradually year by year until peaking at 2047 in 2014.

Collett was primarily interested in starting a newspaper, and after a few years and it was evident that Inderøyningen was well-established, he moved on and Kjell Mære was hired as editor. After some years he was replaced by Stig Tore Laugen. Stig Leinan was hired as editor in 1999, and remained in the seat until 2020. Pia Marie Lerseth took over as editor in 2020. The newspapers image archive was digitalized in 2023, and added to the ditial archives of the Inderøy History and Museum Society.

Inderøyningen was originally broadly owned by locals. In 2002, the regional newspaper Trønder-Avisa started buying up shares, and within a few years had secured full ownership of the newspaper. From 2020 Trønder-Avisa and thus Inderøyningen, entered a strategic cooperation with Amedia.

== Scope ==
Inderøyningen is a local newspaper with Inderøy Municipality as its catchment area. It comes out as a weekly printed newspaper as well as having an online edition. As is common amongst local newspapers in Norway, Inderøyningen entirely focuses on local news, and unlike regional newspapers does not cover regional, national or international news. In early years there was a strong emphasis on sports news, especially football, but this declined heading into the 2000s. Instead there was an increase in coverage of business news.

Inderøyningen covers local political issues, especially those pertaining to the municipality and the municipal council, which often are too narrow to be properly covered in the regional newspapers. Inderøyningen tends to have a more critical coverage of the municipality and public services, and less so towards the business and volunteer sector. The newspaper has a strong emphasis on everyday life in the community, often conducting interviews with people about their regular activities.
