= Indre Akershus Blad =

Newspaper published in Bjørkelangen, Norway

- Owner(s): A-pressen (100%)
- Editor: Arne Henrik Vestreng
- Founded: 1908
- Political alignment: Non-partisan
- Headquarters: Bjørkelangen, Norway
- Circulation: 7,674
- Website: www.indre.no

Indre Akershus Blad is a local newspaper published in Bjørkelangen, Norway.

It was established in 1908 as Indre Akershus, and was politically independent. The current name was taken in 1928. Since 1945 it has been published three times a week.

It mainly covers the municipalities of Aurskog-Høland and Rømskog, but is also distributed in Sørum and Fet. It had a circulation of 6,369 in 1983, increasing to the current 7,674, of whom 7,438 are subscribers. It is owned 100% by A-pressen.
