= Helgelendingen =

Norwegian newspaper

- Owner(s): Amedia (100%)
- Founded: 1929
- Headquarters: Mosjøen, Norway
- Website: helg.no

Helgelendingen, known until 2014 as Helgeland Arbeiderblad, is a daily, regional newspaper published in Mosjøen, with additional offices in Sandnessjøen and Brønnøysund.

== History and profile ==
Helgeland Arbeiderblad was first published on 31 October 1929 as Vefsna Arbeiderblad. The newspaper is owned by A-Pressen, and was until 1952 associated with the Labour Party, although privately owned. It was merged with Helgeland Arbeiderblad, that had first been published in Sandnessjøen in 1930. It was again merged with Nordlands Folkeblad in 1955. The newspaper owns 33% of TV Nordland.

In 2007 the circulation of Helgeland Arbeiderblad was 9,225 copies. In 2008, it had a circulation of 8,842 copies.
