= Aust Agder Blad =

Norwegian Newspaper

- Owner: Amedia (100%)
- Founded: 1854; 172 years ago
- Headquarters: Risør
- Circulation: 3 443 (2017)
- Website: https://austagderblad.no

Aust Agder Blad is a Norwegian newspaper, published in Risør, Norway, and owned by Amedia. The paper was launched in 1854. As of 2010 the editor-in-chief was Rolf Røisland. In June 1940, during the occupation of Norway by Nazi Germany, Aust Agder Blad published secret directives which the press had received from the occupants, after which episode the newspaper was stopped and its editor Knut Holm was imprisoned for the rest of the war.
