= Agder Flekkefjords Tidende =

Norwegian newspaper

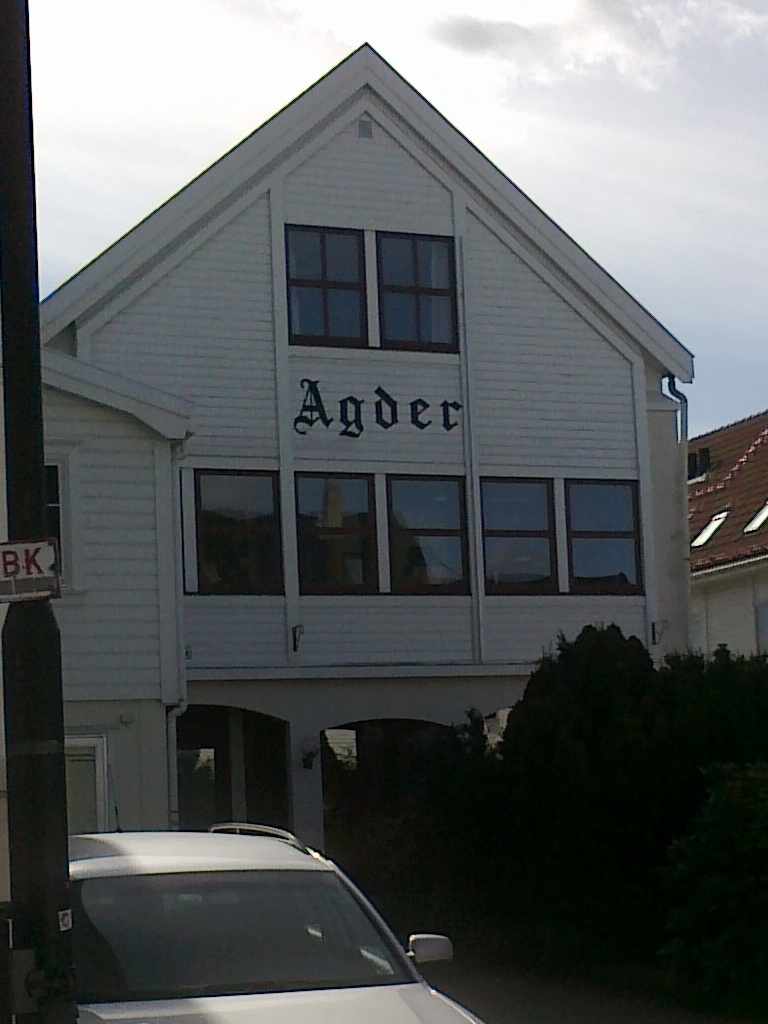
- Agder Flekkefjords Tidende headquarters.
- Type: Three days a week
- Owner: Amedia (100%)
- Editor: Kristen Munksgaard
- Founded: 25 April 1877
- Headquarters: Flekkefjord
- Circulation: 8,026
- Website: www.avisenagder.no

Agder Flekkefjords Tidende is the local newspaper for the southern Norwegian town of Flekkefjord, and the surrounding region of western Agder and eastern Rogaland counties.

== History and profile ==
The first newspaper printed in Flekkefjord was called Agdesidens Budstikke, in 1851. This newspaper was published twice weekly, and ended circulation after only one year.

Agder Flekkefjords Tidende was first published on 25 April 1877. The founders were two schoolteachers, Ole Fuglestvedt and Nicolai Just. It has been published continuously since then, only interrupted by the German occupation, from 1940 to 1945. In 2011, Agder Flekkefjords Tidende had a circulation of 8,026. The newspaper is published by Avisen Agder AS, which is owned by various local interests.
