= Lokalavisa Verran–Namdalseid =

Norwegian newspaper

- Type: Local
- Format: Tabloid and online
- Owner: Trønder-Avisa
- Founded: 2009
- Language: Norwegian
- City: Malm
- Country: Norway
- Circulation: 2,165 (as of 2013)
- Website: lokalavisa.as

Lokalavisa Verran–Namdalseid was a local online and print newspaper in published in Malm, Norway. It covered Verran Municipality and Namdalseid Municipality, and the Beitstad area in Steinkjer Municipality. Published in tabloid format, the newspaper had a circulation of 2,165 in 2013. The newspaper was owned by Trønder-Avisa. It had one weekly issue. The newspaper was founded in 2009.

In August 2017 the newspaper merged with Steinkjer-Avisa.
