= Steinkjer-Avisa =

Norwegian weekly newspaper

- Type: Weekly newspaper
- Format: Tabloid
- Owner: Trønder-Avisa
- Founder: Lothar Viem
- Publisher: Steinkjer-Avisa AS
- Editor: Monica Irén Solberg Susegg (2022–)
- Founded: 7 August 1984; 42 years ago
- Language: Norwegian
- Headquarters: Kongens gate 30, Steinkjer
- City: Steinkjer
- Country: Norway
- Circulation: 4,037 (as of 2023)
- Website: steinkjer-avisa.no

Steinkjer-Avisa is a weekly, local, online and printed newspaper published in Steinkjer, Norway. In 2023, it had a circulation of 4,037, and was published each Friday.

The newspaper was founded by Lothar Viem and was first published on 7 August 1984. The Viem family sold the newspaper to Trønder-Avisa in 1999. Since 2020, it has been an online-first newspaper. Editor since 2022 has been Monica Irén Solberg Susegg.

== History ==
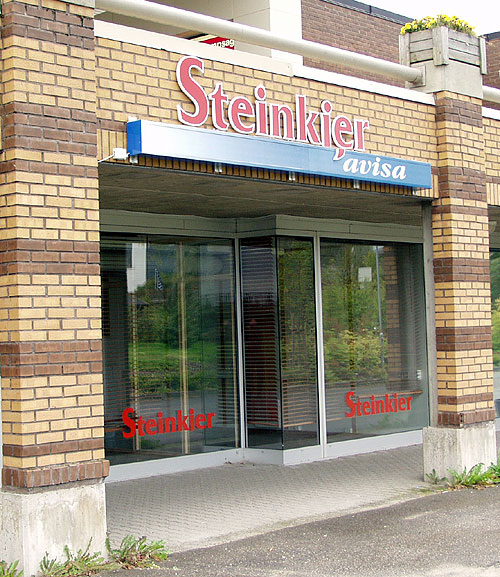
Steinkjer-Avisa's offices in Namdalsvegen 30, where they were located from 1997 to 2003

Steinkjer was since the 1940s dominated by a single newspaper, Trønder-Avisa, which had been formed in 1940. It was published in Steinkjer, but was in reality a regional newspaper covering all of Nord-Trøndelag. Bygdenes By failed to challenge it in the 1950s. Journalist Lothar Viem (born 1943) believed that he could challenge Trønder-Avisa. He had worked there as a journalist from 1962 to 1973, and for Adresseavisen's Steinkjer office from 1975 to 1983, and finally for the local newspaper Innherreds Folkeblad og Verdalingen in the neighboring municipality of Verdal.

Viem established a limited company and was initially the sole owner of the newspaper, and the original editor. He had originally envisioned that the newspaper was to be named Hello Steinkjer. He instead landed on the name Steinkjer-Avisa, a homage to the historic Stenkjær Avis, one of the predecessors of Trønder-Avisa. No other journalists were initially hired, although the newspaper did use freelancers. Six people were hired, with a large portion of the work being tied to typography, which the newspaper did in-house. A deal was struck with Namdal Arbeiderblad for printing at their press in Namsos. This also meant that the newspaper had to use the same tabloid format as NA. Instead of using a delivery service, Steinkjer-Avisa was distributed with the Postal Service, with two weekly editions, initially on Tuesdays and Fridays.

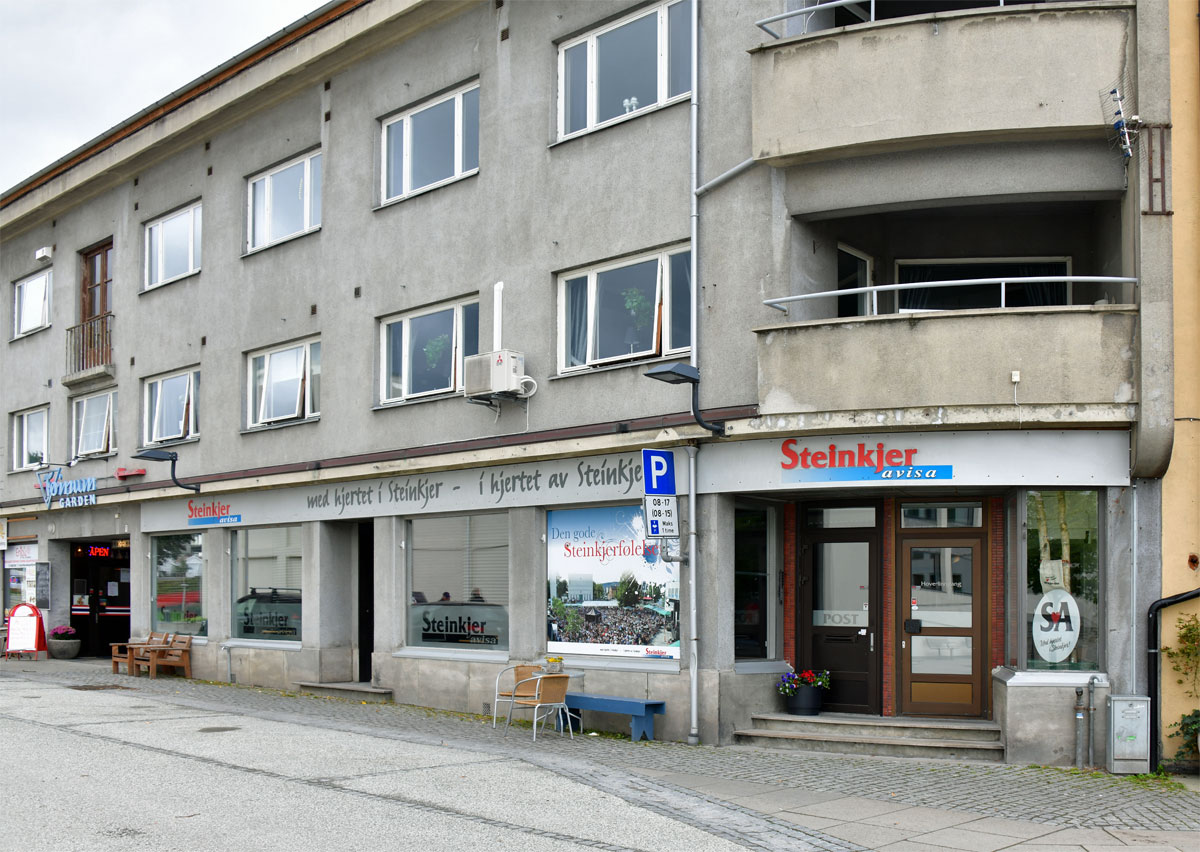
The offices in Elvegata 1, where the newspaper had its offices from 2003 to 2023

The first issue was published on 7 August 1984, and was distributed free to all households in Steinkjer Municipality. With only two weekly issues, the newspaper would not be able to cover typical news items as fast as their larger competitor. It adopted the slogan "no issue is too small to be covered by Steinkjer-Avisa", and aimed to cover smaller, every-day life issues in the down, and focus mostly on the town of Steinkjer rather than the whole municipality. Within a year, the newspaper had 2,500 subscribers, and soon after reached a staff of twelve.

By 1990 the print circulation reached a temporary peak of 3345. From the early 1990s the newspaper changed to only a one weekly edition, on Fridays. Lothar Viem transferred half of the ownership of the newspaper to his wife, Bodil Elisabeth Viem. Later their three sons came into the ownership, with the five each owning twenty percent each. Lothar Viem, a Snåsa native, started up a second local newspaper, Snåsningen, in the neighboring municipality in 1995. He remained editor of both newspapers until 1999.

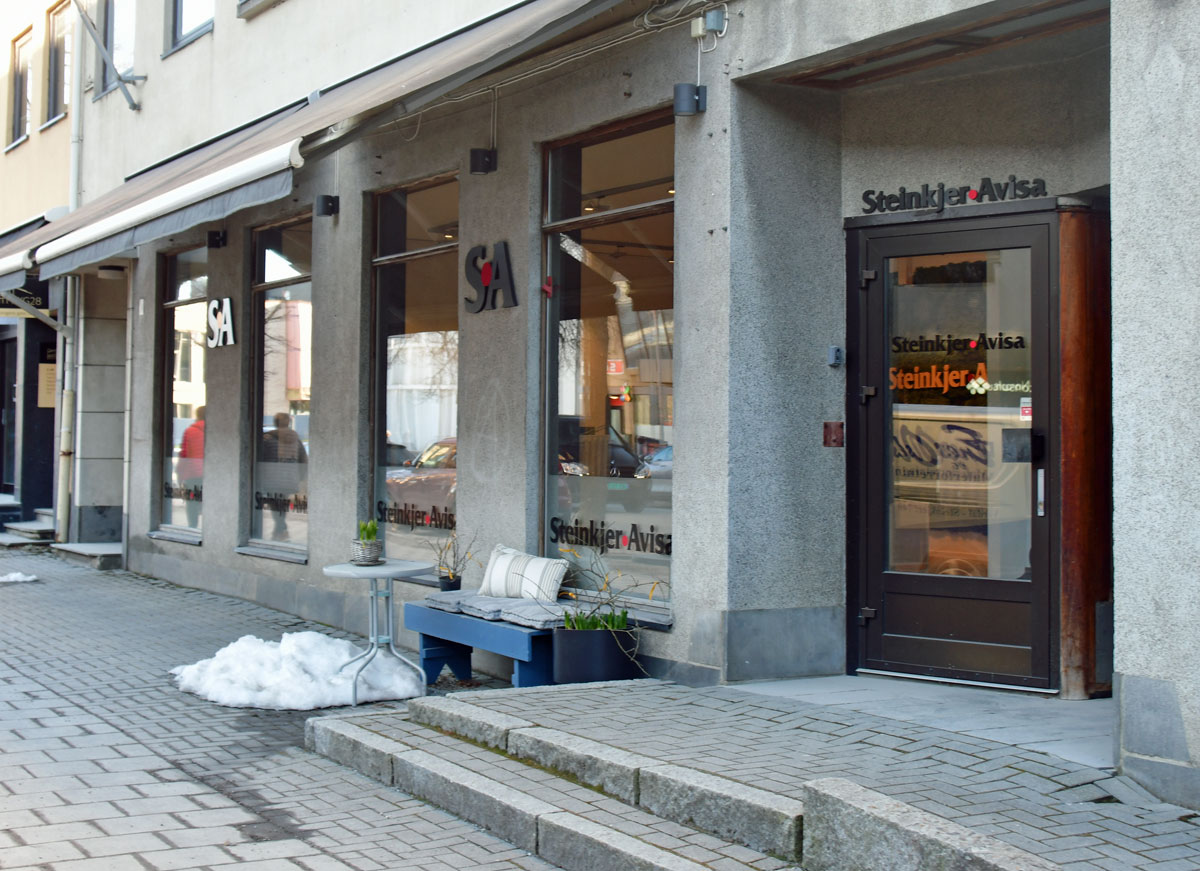
Since 2023, the newspaper has had its offices in Kongens gate 30

The Viem family sold the newspaper to Trønder-Avisa in 1999. They also took over the printing of the newspaper. This mean that it needed to change to Berliner format, to match that of T-A. Both newspapers later switched to tabloid. The newspaper continued to see rising readership in the 2000s and 2010s, and its circulation peaked at 4961 in 2014. Steinkjer-Avisa won Local Newspaper of the Year in 2001.

Lothar Viem resiged as editor in 1999, and was replaced by Borgar Jønvik. He was succeeded by Odd Birger Grønli in 2003, who remained on the post until 2016. He was replaced by Tore Vikan, before Monica Irén Solberg Susegg took over in 2022.

Lokalavisa Verran–Namdalseid was merged into Steinkjer-Avisa in August 2017. From 21 September 2020, the online newspaper became the primary publishing channel. From then on, articles were published immediately on the online newspaper, instead of waiting for a weekly update following the printed version.
