= Helge Nitteberg =

Norwegian newspaper editor

- Born: 2 October 1981 (age 44); Tromsø, Norway
- Occupations: journalist and newspaper editor

Helge Nitteberg (born 2 October 1981) is a Norwegian journalist and newspaper editor. He has been editor-in-chief of the newspaper Nordlys since 2016.

== Biography ==
Born in Tromsø on 2 October 1981, Nitteberg is a schoolteacher by education, but has worked as journalist since 1996. He was a freelance journalist for the newspaper Troms Folkeblad from 1996, for Adresseavisen from 2001 to 2003, and for Nordlys from 2003 to 2007, when he got a permanent assignment with the newspaper.

In 2016 he was appointed editor-in-chief of Nordlys, succeeding Anders Opdahl.

Media offices
| Preceded by Anders Opdahl | Chief editor of Nordlys; 2016– | Succeeded by Incumbent |
