= Per Ravn Omdal =

Norwegian football official (born 1947)

Per Ravn Omdal (born 20 August 1947) is a former president of the Football Association of Norway. He's also been the vice president of UEFA since 1996.

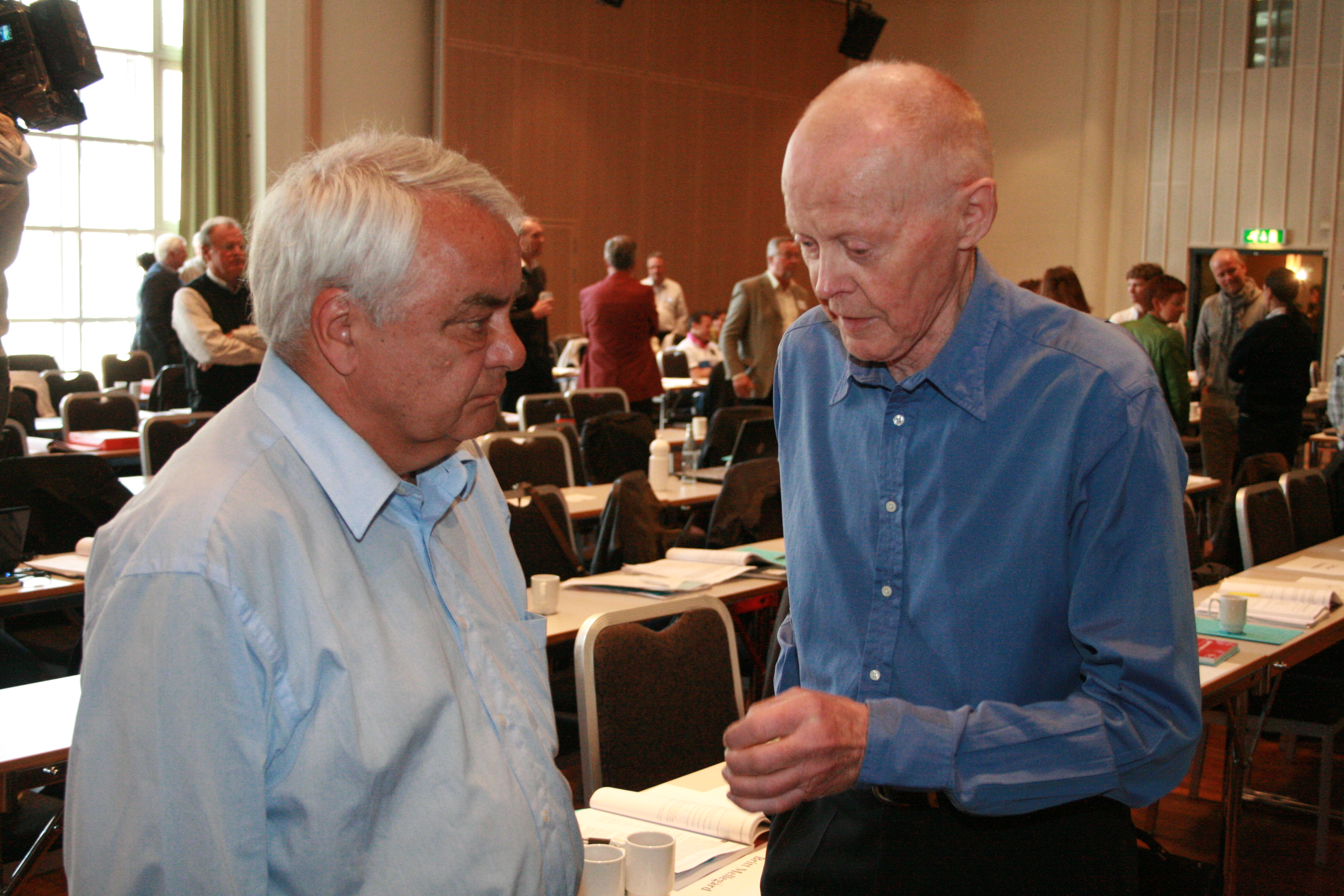

Per Ravn Omdal has represented Norwegian football with distinction for a number of years within the world and European football movement. A football enthusiast since his childhood, he has been a particularly important figure in football's drive to bolster the game's grassroots.

== Honorary president ==
Omdal was born on 20 August 1947 in Stavanger. He became a UEFA vice-president in 1996, having joined the executive committee as a member in 1992. His work within the Football Association of Norway (NFF) over the years—he also served as NFF president for two terms—led to him being bestowed with the title of honorary president.

== EU role ==
As chairman of the Executive Committee EU Matters Working Group, Omdal has played an important diplomatic and lobbying role within UEFA's dialogue with the European political authorities. He serves on the Meridian Project Board and European Professional Football Strategy Board and Leagues, and was also a European member of the FIFA Executive Committee from 1994 to 2002.

== Dedicated enthusiast ==
Omdal, the son of a football administrator, feels he was born into the game. His playing days included a spell with Lillestrøm SK, now in the top flight but then in the Third Division. His involvement with the NFF began in 1974. The UEFA vice-president has overseen the development of men's and women's football in his home country, and has served the game with the dedication of someone who "cannot think of a life without football".

He represents the club Fossum IF.

Sporting positions
Preceded by Eldar Hansen	President of the Football Association of Norway; 1987–1992	Succeeded by Odd Flattum
Preceded by Odd Flattum	President of the Football Association of Norway; 1995–2004	Succeeded by Sondre Kåfjord
