= Football for All in Vietnam =

School sports project in Vietnam

Football for All in Vietnam (FFAV) (Vietnamese: Bóng đá Cộng đồng tại Việt Nam) is a project in Vietnam started by the Norwegian Football Federation (Norges Fotballforbund, NFF) in Hanoi in 2001. The organization cooperates with the school authorities locally and nationally, as well as with the Vietnam Football Federation (VFF). The project was moved to Huế in 2003. The purpose is to make the schools a better place, as well as providing important life skills. The project has a strict focus on grassroots football, where participation is based on interest, not skills. The project has 110 football clubs in primary and secondary schools in Huế, with about 11,000 players. 50% of the players are girls.

In 2017, the organization received an award for Best Volunteer Football Organization from the Asian Football Confederation.
