= Yngve Hallén =

Norwegian sports executive (born 1968)

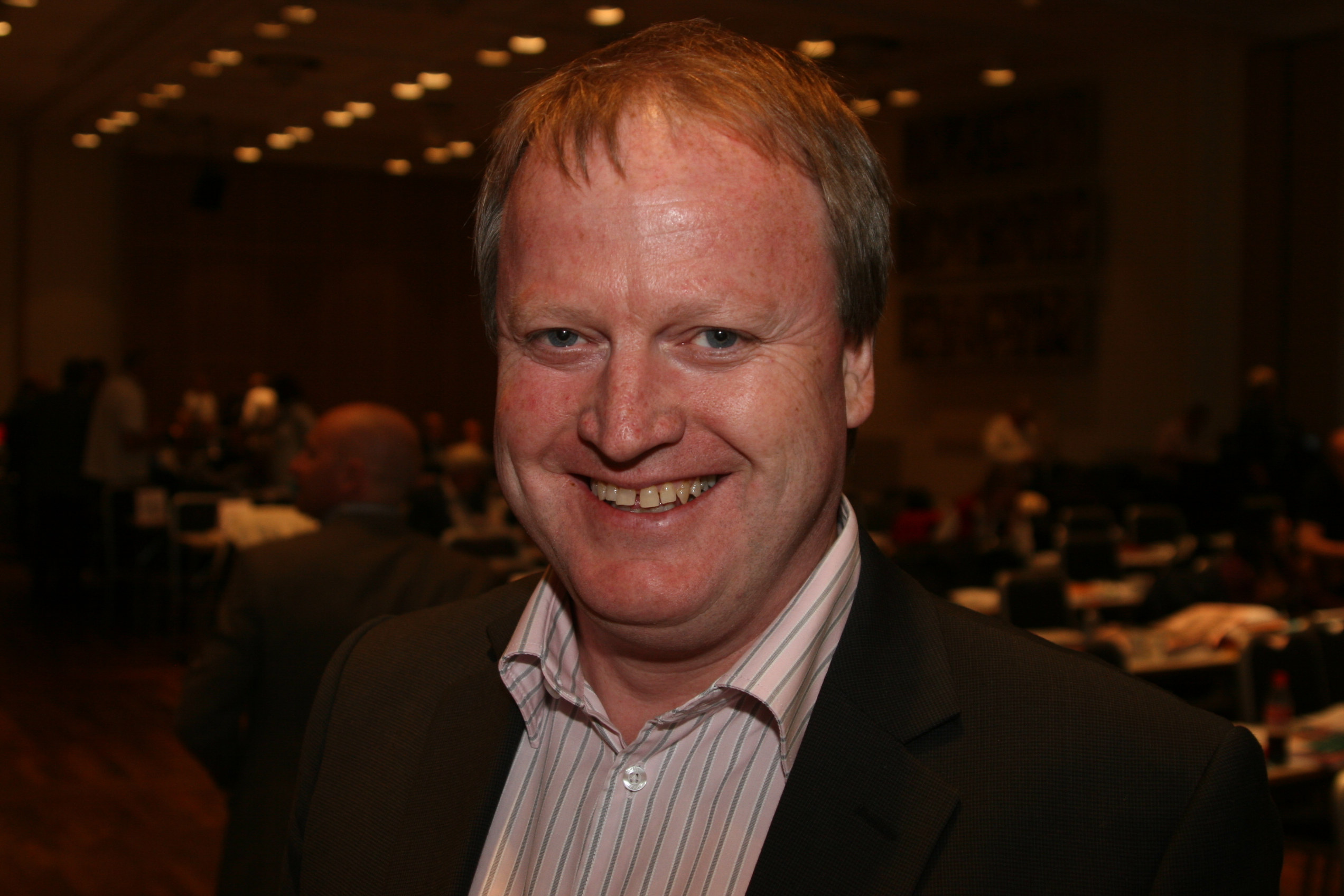
- Hallén in 2010
- Born: 14 March 1968 (age 58); Bergen, Norway
- Known for: Member of the FIFA Ethics Committee
- Title: President of the Norwegian Football Association
- Term: 2010–2016
- Predecessor: Sondre Kåfjord
- Successor: Terje Svendsen

Yngve Hallén (born 14 March 1968) is a Norwegian sports executive who was president of the Norwegian Football Association from 2010 to 2016. He helped start the UEFA Nations League. He was elected to his position in March 2010, following Sondre Kåfjord. Hallén comes from Sogndal Fotball, where he was director.

He did not run again for presidency in 2016. His critics have repeatedly condemned Hallén for a number of football-related problems. Among other things, they complained that he had concluded an unfavorable contract for the television broadcasting rights of the Norwegian football league. He was blamed for not being able to overcome the economic problems of Norwegian football during his tenure. He has also been accused several times of failing to act with sufficient vigor to detect and eradicate in 2015 FIFA corruption case.

Hallén was a member of the FIFA Ethics Committee.

Sporting positions
Preceded by Sondre Kåfjord	President of the Norwegian Football Association; 2010–2016	Succeeded by Terje Svendsen
