= Ytringen =

Online and print newspaper in Norway

- Type: Local
- Format: Tabloid and online
- Owner(s): Helgelands Blad and Trønder-Avisa
- Language: Norwegian
- City: Kolvereid
- Country: Norway
- Circulation: 3,038 (as of 2013)
- Website: ytringen.no

Ytringen is a local online and print newspaper in published in Kolvereid, Norway. It covers the Ytre Namdal area, consisting of Nærøysund Municipality, Leka Municipality, and Bindal Municipality. Published in tabloid format, the newspaper has a circulation of 3,038 in 2013. It is owned 49 percent by Helgelands Blad and 47 percent by Trønder-Avisa. It has two weekly issues, on Tuesdays and Fridays.
