= Norwegian Football Federation =

Governing body of Norwegian football

UEFA
- Founded: 30 April 1902; 124 years ago
- Headquarters: Oslo
- FIFA affiliation: 1908
- UEFA affiliation: 15 June 1954; 72 years ago
- President: Lise Klaveness
- Website: fotball.no

The Norwegian Football Federation (Bokmål: Norges Fotballforbund, Nynorsk: Noregs Fotballforbund; NFF; Northern Sami: Norgga spábbačiekčanlihttu) is the governing body of football in Norway. It was formed in 1902 and organizes the men's and women's national teams, as well as the league systems for men and women (whose top levels are the Eliteserien and Toppserien, respectively). The current president of NFF is Lise Klaveness. By 1 January 2004, there were 1,814 clubs organized in Norway and 373,532 registered players. It is the largest sports federation in Norway.

The NFF joined FIFA in 1908 and UEFA in 1954.

The NFF was part of an unsuccessful joint bid with the SvFF, the DBU, and the SPL to host the UEFA Euro 2008 championship. The SvFF invited the NFF to join them in bidding for the UEFA Euro 2016 championship. The NFF and Norwegian politicians expressed support for such a proposal, but Euro 2016 was eventually awarded to France.

The Norwegian Football Federation announced in December 2024 that Norway would not compete against the Israeli national football team in the 2026 FIFA World Cup qualifiers and called on FIFA and UEFA to investigate Israeli human rights violations against the Palestinian population before the match between Norway and Israel in March 2025.

== Foundation ==
In Spring 1902, Lyn invited representatives from Grane and Spring (both now defunct) to join together in forming a national football association. On 30 April, 14 delegates from the three clubs met at the Hotel Bristol in Oslo. These were Trygve Karlsen, Arthur Nordlie, Leif Eriksen, and Bredo Eriksen from Lyn; Just Hagemann, Isak Benjaminsen, Walter Aigeltinger, and Emil Wettergreen from Grane; and Christen Hummel Johansen, Arne Baggerud, Birger Freihow, Thorleif Wibe, and Thorvald Torgersen from Spring. Together they agreed to form a football association and voted 9 to 5 to adopt the name proposed by Lyn - Norsk Fodboldforbund. Isak Benjaminsen from Grane was adopted as the first chairman.

== International honours ==
=== Men ===
- Olympic Bronze Medal 1936

=== U21 Men ===
- European Championships Bronze Medal 1998, 2013

=== Women ===
- World Cup Silver Medal 1991
- World Cup Gold Medal 1995
- Olympic Gold Medal 2000
- European Championships Gold Medal 1987, 1993
- European Championships Silver Medal 1989, 1991, 2005, 2013
- European Championships Bronze Medal 2009

== Regional associations ==
- NFF Agder
- NFF Akershus
- NFF Buskerud
- NFF Finnmark
- NFF Hordaland
- NFF Hålogaland
- NFF Indre Østland
- Nordland fotballkrets
- Nordmøre og Romsdal fotballkrets
- Oslo fotballkrets
- Rogaland fotballkrets
- Sogn og Fjordane fotballkrets
- Sunnmøre fotballkrets
- Telemark fotballkrets
- Troms fotballkrets
- Trøndelag fotballkrets
- Vestfold fotballkrets
- Østfold fotballkrets

== Presidents ==
- Isak Benjaminsen (Grane), 1902–03
- Emil Wettergreen (Grane), 1903–04
- Arthur Nordlie (Lyn), 1904–05
- Sverre Strand (Grane), 1905–06
- H.W. Benneche (Sarpsborg), 1906–07
- Carl Frølich Hanssen (Mercantile), 1908–09
- Arthur Nordlie (Lyn), 1909–10
- C.F.B. Schøyen (Hamar IL), 1910–13
- Johannes Jordell (Kristiania IF), 1913–14
- Carl Frølich Hanssen (Mercantile), 1914–15
- Daniel Eie (Lyn), 1915–18

- Carl Emil Christiansen (Urædd), 1918–20
- Reidar Bergh (Frigg), 1920–24
- Sam Knutzen (Ready), 1924–26
- Daniel Eie (Lyn), 1926–28
- Jacob Ramm (Mercantile), 1928–29
- Per Skou (Lyn), 1929–34
- Bjarne Gulbrandsen (Odd), 1934–36
- Reidar Dahl (Lyn), 1936–41, 1945–49
- Harald Evensen (Moss), 1949–53
- Reidar Dahl, 1953–55
- Aksel W. Floer (Speed), 1955–63

- Jørgen Jahre (Sandefjord), 1963–66
- Odd Evensen (Moss), 1966–70
- Einar Jørum (Vålerengen), 1970–80
- Eldar Hansen (Rosenborg), 1980–87
- Per Ravn Omdal (Fossum), 1987–92
- Odd Flattum (Vikersund), 1992–96
- Per Ravn Omdal (Fossum), 1996–2004
- Sondre Kåfjord (Molde), 2004–2010
- Yngve Hallén (Sogndal), 2010–2016
- Terje Svendsen (Rosenborg), 2016–2022
- Lise Klaveness (Kvernbit), 2022–

== National team coaches ==
The following are head coaches for the Norwegian national teams, including assistant coaches on senior level:

- Norway men: Ståle Solbakken
- Norway men, assistant: Kent Bergersen
- Norway women: Leif Gunnar Smerud (acting)
- Norway women, assistant: Ingvild Stensland
- Norway women, assistant: Monica Knudsen

- U21 men: Jan Peder Jalland
- U18–20 men: Luís Pimenta
- U23 women: Per Inge Jacobsen
- U19 women: Lena Tyriberget

- U15–17 men: Bjørn Johansen
- U15–17 men: Igor Aase
- U15–17 women: Bengt Sæternes
- U15–17 women: Elise Brotangen

== See also ==
- Football for All in Vietnam, a 2001 project
- Seasons in Norwegian football
