= Einar Jørum =

Norwegian footballer (1924–1997)

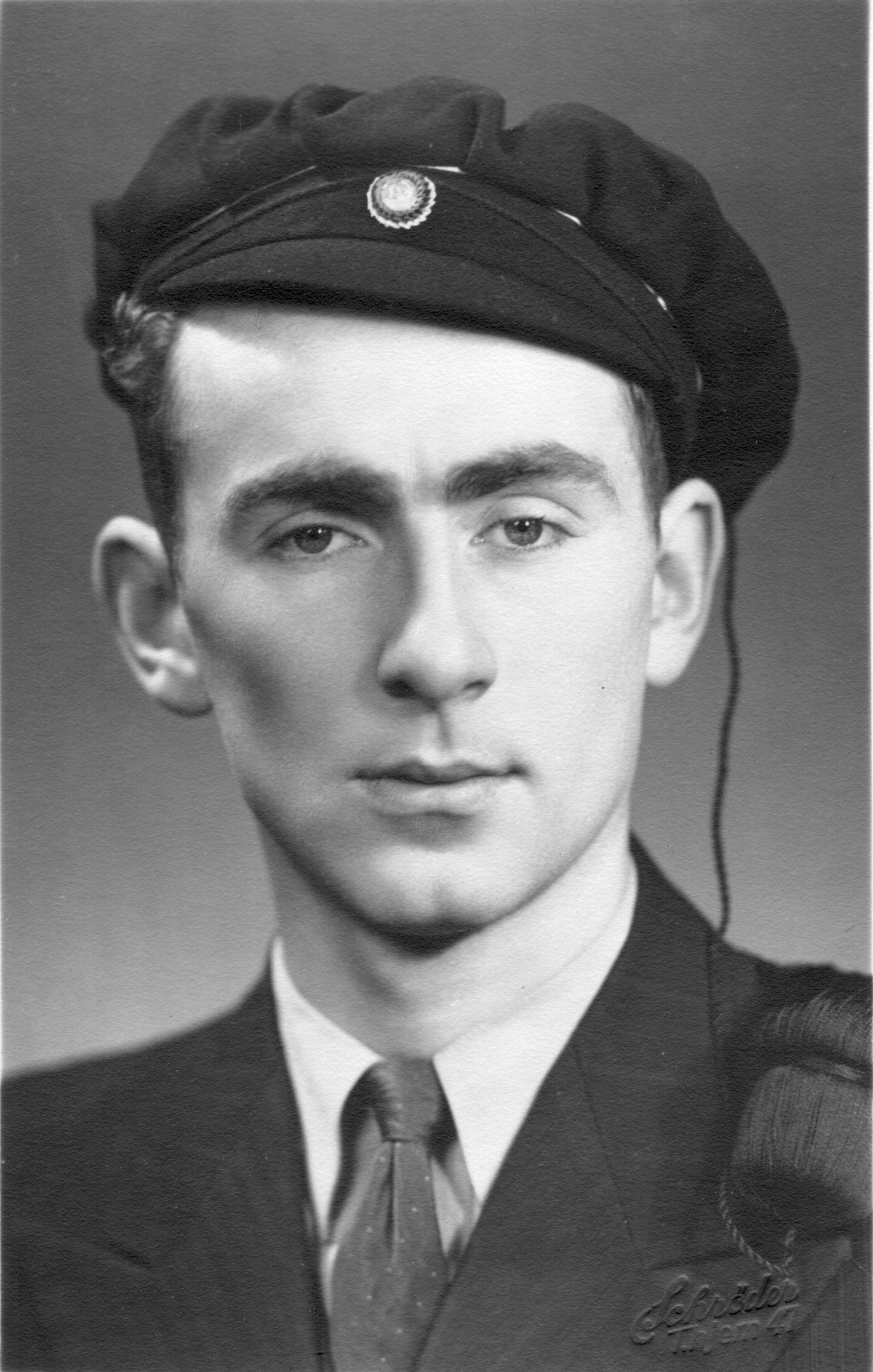

Personal information
- Date of birth: 16 June 1924
- Place of birth: Åsen, Norway
- Date of death: 10 September 1997 (aged 73)

Senior career*
Years	Team	Apps	(Gls)
- Rosenborg BK
- Vålerenga Fotball
- FK Bodø/Glimt
- * Club domestic league appearances and goals

Einar Jørum (16 June 1924 – 10 September 1997) was a Norwegian football player and leader.

He was born in Åsen. He played for the clubs Rosenborg BK, Vålerenga Fotball, Bodø/Glimt and Bardufoss during his active career from 1945 to 1959. He served as president of the Football Association of Norway from 1970 to 1980.

Sporting positions
Preceded by Odd Evensen	President of the Football Association of Norway; 1970–1980	Succeeded by Eldar Hansen
