= Ivan Kristoffersen =

Norwegian newspaper editor and politician (1931–2016)

Ivan Kolbjørn Kristoffersen (21 January 1931 – 26 February 2016) was a Norwegian newspaper editor.

== Early life, education and career ==
He was born in Tromsø, as a son of Henry Kristian Kristoffersen (1896–1981) and Klara Henriette Olufsen (1897–1984). He finished his secondary education in 1951 and graduated from the Norwegian Journalist Academy in 1954. In the same year he became an apprentice of hometown newspaper Nordlys. He was promoted to subeditor in 1964, feature editor in 1974 and political editor in 1976. His only absence from Nordlys came in 1972 when he was press secretary for the Norwegian UN delegation, and from 1979 to 1981 when he was a State Secretary for the Labour Party in the Ministry of Fisheries. From 1982 to his retirement in 1997 he was the editor-in-chief.

He was known for supporting Norwegian European Communities membership in 1972, but opposing Norwegian European Union membership in 1994. After retiring he has been adjunct docent at Bodø University College and an adviser at the University of Tromsø. From 1998 to 2001 he chaired the Broadcasting Council. He was decorated with the HM The King's Medal of Merit in 1997 and the Fritt Ord Honorary Award in 2000.

== Personal life ==
Kristoffersen was married to nurse Anne Johanne Lorentzen from 1958 to 1993. He was then a cohabitant with Oddny Aleksandersen from 1993 to 1995.
