= Eldar Hansen =

Norwegian footballer (born 1941)

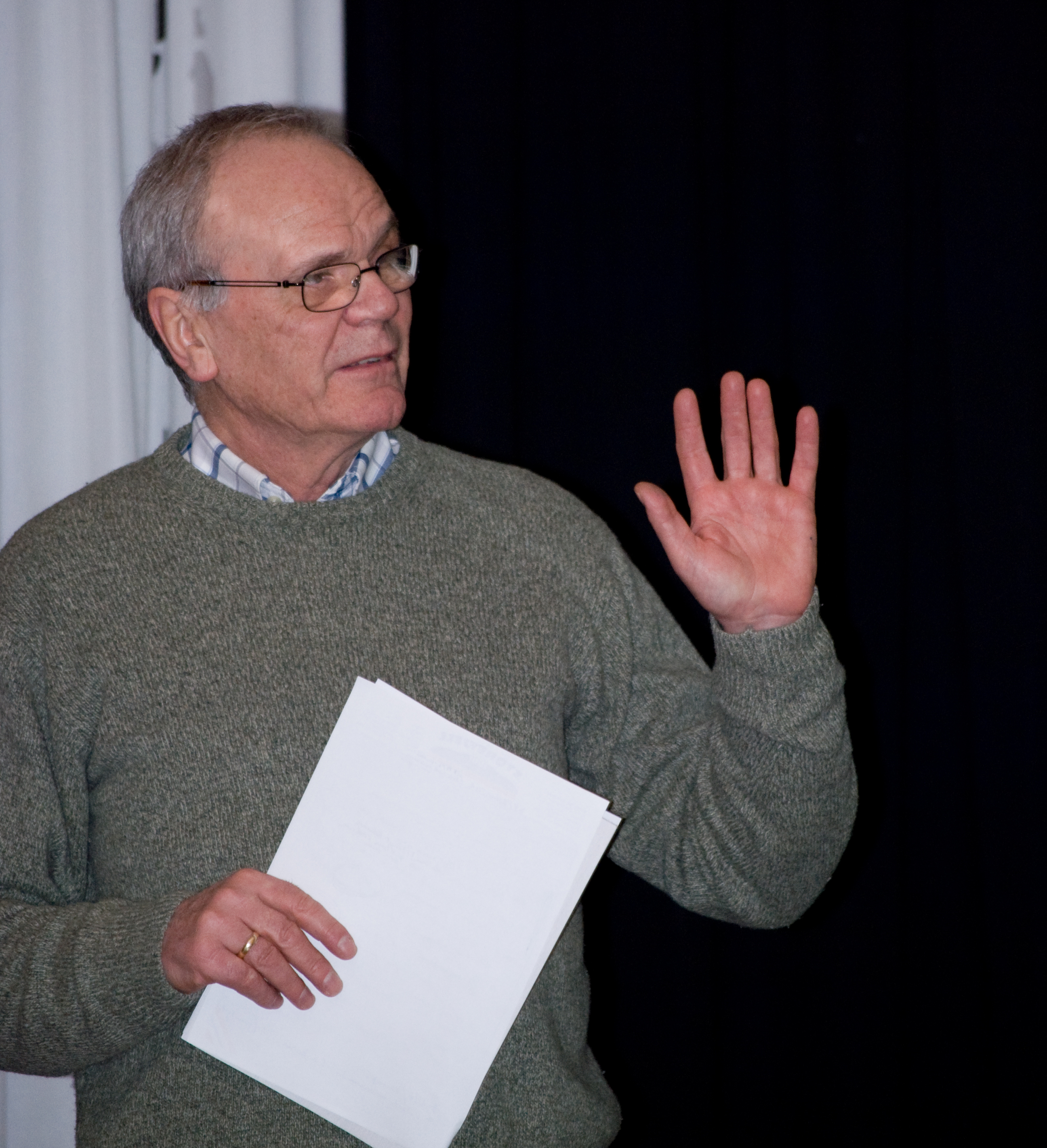
- Hansen in 2010

Personal information
- Date of birth: 7 November 1941 (age 84)
- Place of birth: Trondheim, Norway

Senior career*
Years	Team	Apps	(Gls)
- Rosenborg BK

International career
1961	Norway	1	(1)
- * Club domestic league appearances and goals

Eldar Hansen (born 7 November 1941) is a Norwegian former football player and leader.

== Biography ==
Hansen was born in Trondheim. He played for the club Rosenborg BK, and won the Norwegian Football Cup twice with Rosenborg, in 1960 and 1964. He was capped once and scored one goal for the Norwegian national team. He served as president of the Football Association of Norway from 1980 to 1987. In 2010, it was accused that he had engaged in player sales of 650,000 NOK, but he denies it stating that this was sponsorship money that he was already guaranteed to get.

Sporting positions
Preceded by Einar Jørum	President of the Football Association of Norway; 1980–1987	Succeeded by Per Ravn Omdal
