= Sondre Kåfjord =

Norwegian football administrator (born 1948)

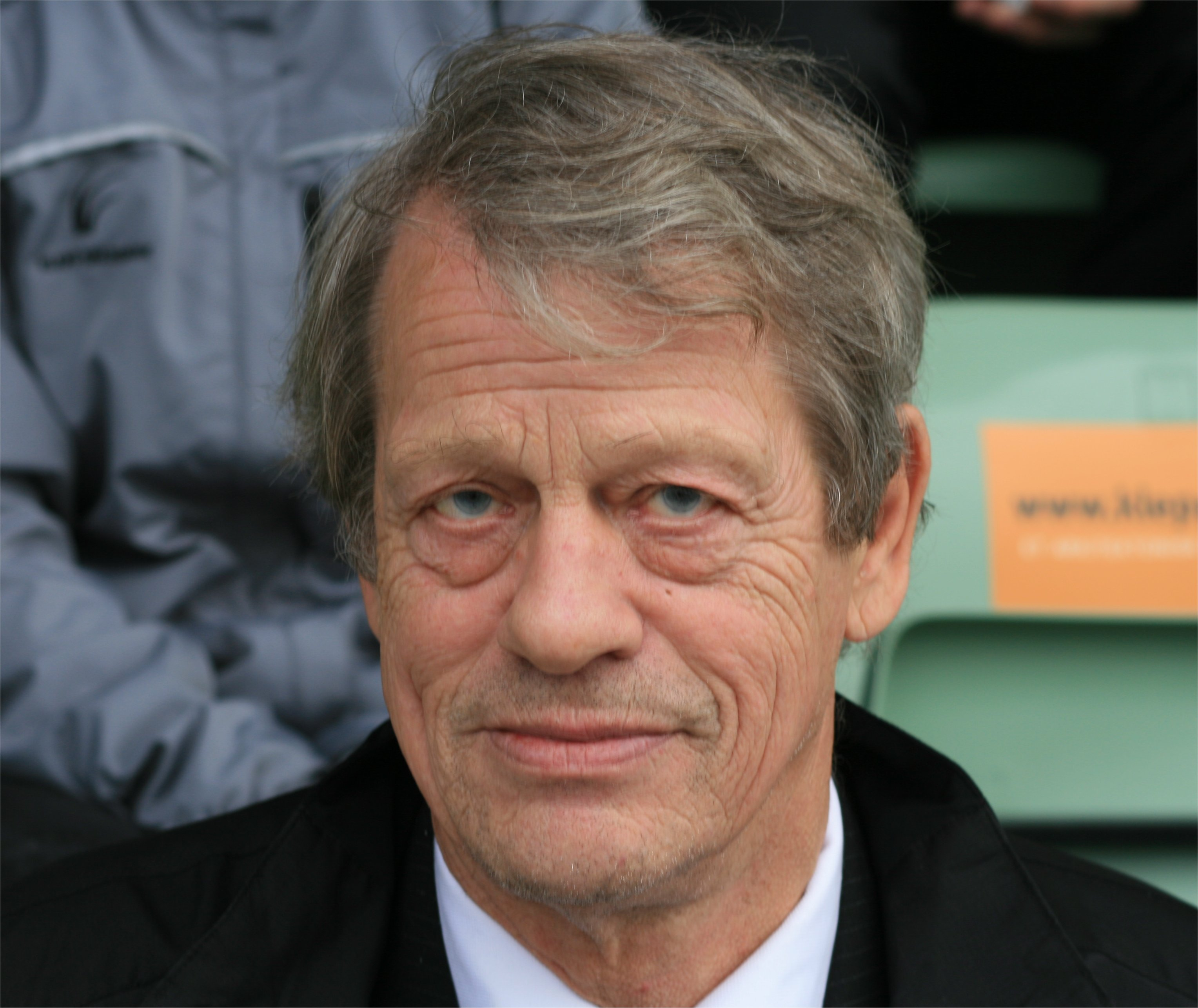
Kåfjord in 2007

Sondre Kåfjord (born 7 June 1948) was president of the Football Association of Norway (NFF) from 2004 to 2010. He was replaced by Yngve Hallén.

Hailing from Mandal, Kåfjord is educated as Siviløkonom in Bergen, and he has been rector at Molde University College. He worked in Sparebanken Møre before he was president of NFF.

Sporting positions
Preceded by Per Ravn Omdal	President of the Norwegian Football Association; 2004–2010	Succeeded by Yngve Hallén
