= Hans Kristian Amundsen =

Norwegian newspaper editor and politician (1959–2018)

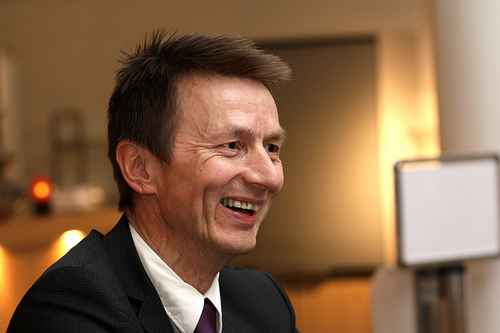
Hans Kristian Amundsen

Hans Kristian Amundsen (2 December 1959 – 29 July 2018) was a Norwegian newspaper editor and politician for the Labour Party.

In January 2011 he was appointed State Secretary in the Ministry of Fisheries and Coastal Affairs. In May 2011 he moved to the Office of the Prime Minister. He was formerly the editor-in-chief of Nordlys.
