= Bygdeposten =

Norwegian newspaper

- Type: Weekly newspaper
- Owner(s): Amedia (100%)
- Founded: 1954
- Headquarters: Vikersund, Norway
- Circulation: 6,178 (2017)
- Website: bygdeposten.no

Bygdeposten is a Norwegian newspaper established in 1954, published in Vikersund, Norway, and owned by A-pressen. Its first editor was Jørgen Bergo. The newspaper covers the municipalities of Modum, Sigdal, Krødsherad and Øvre Eiker.
