= Meråkerposten =

Norwegian local newspaper

- Type: Weekly newspaper
- Format: Tabloid
- Owner(s): Trønder-Avisa (65%); Amedia (35%)
- Founder: Bendik Christensen
- Publisher: Meråkerposten AS
- Editor: Geir Olav Flåan
- Founded: 5 August 1982; 44 years ago
- Language: Norwegian
- Headquarters: Midtbygda
- City: Meråker
- Country: Norway
- Circulation: 1,578 (as of 2023)
- Website: merakerposten.no

Meråkerposten (lit. 'The Meråker Gazette') is a Norwegian local newspaper published in Meråker Municipality in Trøndelag county. Meråkerposten is published weekly, appearing on Thursdays. The newspaper was established in 1982.

== History ==
The newspaper was founded by Bendik Christensen, who wanted to start a newspaper for his home community. The first issue was published on 5 August 1982. Later the same year, he sold the newspaper to Karsten Tidemann and Dagny Selliset, who both worked for the newspaper. Selliset sold her share of the company to Tidemann in 1985, who had become editor. The newspaper's circulation peaked at 1714 in 1988, before steadily declining.

Originally the offices were situated at Gudå, but moved to Midtbygda in 1990. At the time there were five employees in the newspaper. Tidemann sold the newspaper to Adresseavisen in 1996, with Tidemann continuing on as editor for another two years. For a short period, Svein Karsten Henden was editor. Svein Halvor Moe took over as editor after him. He then bought the newspaper from Adresseavisen in 2000 and continued as editor until 2021.

Trønder-Avisa bought 65 percent of the newspaper and Amedia the remaining 35 percent in 2021. Moe resigned as editor and was replaced by Geir Olav Flåan. By 2021 Meråkerposten had yet to launch an online edition, and Trønder-Avisa announced that this would be a top priority from the onset. Circulation subsequently rose from 871 in 2018 to 1578 in 2023.

== Circulation ==
According to the Norwegian Audit Bureau of Circulations and National Association of Local Newspapers, Meråkerposten has had the following annual circulation:

- 2004: 1,225
- 2005: 1,115
- 2006: 1,131
- 2007: 1,199
- 2008: 1,357
- 2009: 1,279
- 2010: 1,238
- 2011: 1,201
- 2012: 1,094
- 2013: 1,103
- 2014: 1,067
- 2015: 1,040
- 2016: 1,005
