= Helgelands Blad =

Norwegian newspaper

- Type: Local
- Format: Tabloid and online
- Language: Norwegian
- City: Sandnessjøen
- Country: Norway
- Circulation: 4,793 (as of 2013)
- Website: hblad.no

Helgelands Blad is a local online and print newspaper published in Sandnessjøen, Norway. It covers Alstahaug Municipality and vicinity in outer Helgeland. Published in tabloid format, the newspaper had a circulation of 4,793 in 2013. The newspaper is independently owned. It has three weekly issues, on Mondays, Wednesdays and Fridays. The newspaper was founded in 1904.
