= Snåsningen =

Local print newspaper

- Type: Weekly newspaper
- Format: Tabloid and online
- Owner: Trønder-Avisa
- Founder: Lothar Viem
- Language: Norwegian
- City: Snåsa
- Country: Norway
- Circulation: 1,603 (as of 2013)
- Website: snasningen.no

Snåsningen is a weekly, local, online and print newspaper published in Snåsa Municipality, Norway. Published in tabloid format, the newspaper had a circulation of 1,603 in 2013. The newspaper is owned by Trønder-Avisa. It has one weekly issue, on Wednesday. The newspaper was founded in 1995.

== History ==
The first newspaper in Snåsa was Snåsa-Posten, a volunteer newspaper launched in 1992. It was regarded as having low quality. Several people asked Trønder-Avisa's local journalist, Albert Collett, if he would run the newspaper. He liked the idea of running a local newspaper, but believed there was not sufficient population in Snåsa to make it work financially. This spurred the idea for him to found Inderøyningen in Inderøy, but left Snåsa without a newspaper.

Instead the opportunity was seized by Lothar Viem in 1995. He was born in Snåsa in 1943, and after several decades as a journalist had founded the local newspaper Steinkjer-Avisa in 1984. He started Snåsningen in September 1995, and was editor of both newspapers until 1999. Viem continued as a journalist in Snåsningen until 2010. The newspaper started providing material in Southern Sámi in July 2009. The Viem family sold Snåsningen to the regional newspaper Trønder-Avisa in 2010.
