= Namdalsavisa =

Norwegian newspaper

- Type: Daily newspaper
- Format: Tabloid
- Owner: A-pressen
- Editor-in-chief: Svein H. Karlsen
- Founded: 1917
- Language: Norwegian (bokmål)
- Headquarters: Namsos, Norway
- Circulation: 12,898 (2007)
- Website: www.namdalsavisa.no

Namdalsavisa is a daily, local newspaper serving the Namdal district, primarily Namsos Municipality, Norway.

== Profile ==
Namdalsavisa is published in six times per week in Trøndelag county. It was known as Namdal Arbeiderblad until the mid-1990s.

As of 1981 the owner of the paper was the Labour Party and trade unions. The newspaper is currently owned by A-pressen. It is published in tabloid format.

Rolf A. Amdal, a member of the Labor Party, served as the editor-in-chief of Namdalsavisa.

The 2007 circulation of the paper was 12,898 copies.
