= Østlands-Posten =

Norwegian newspaper

- Type: Daily newspaper
- Owner: A-pressen
- Editor: Eirik Haugen
- Founded: 1881
- Political alignment: Liberal Party of Norway (1881-1972); Independent (from 1972)
- Headquarters: Torget 1 (Larvik)
- Circulation: 14284
- Price: NOK 20
- Website: www.op.no

Østlands-Posten is a local newspaper published in Larvik, Norway. It covers news from Larvik Municipality. It was established in 1881. As of December 2022, the newspaper publishes a paperback newspaper on Tuesday, Thursday and Saturday. On Monday, Wednesday and Friday they publish one on their website.

It has a circulation of 14,284, of whom 13,888 are subscribers.

1896-1995 Østlands-Posten was owned by the Næss family. It is now published by the company A-pressen Lokale Medier AS, which in turn is owned 100% by A-pressen.
