= Trønder-Avisa =

Regional newspaper in Norway

Trønder-Avisa is a regional newspaper in Norway. It is printed in the town of Steinkjer in Trøndelag county. The newspaper was founded as a union of Nord-Trøndelag (founded 1919) and Inntrøndelagen (founded 1897) after both newspapers' headquarters were bombed during the Second World War. These two papers were originally connected to the Norwegian Centre Party and the Liberal Party (Inntrøndelagen). This connection still exists to some extent by ownership. The newspaper is published by a company with the same name, Trønder-Avisa Group. The company also owns the local papers Inderøyningen, Steinkjer-Avisa, Lokalavisa Verran-Namdalseid, Ytringen and Snåsningen.

== See also ==
- List of Norwegian newspapers
