= Christian Hilt =

Norwegian newspaper editor and politician

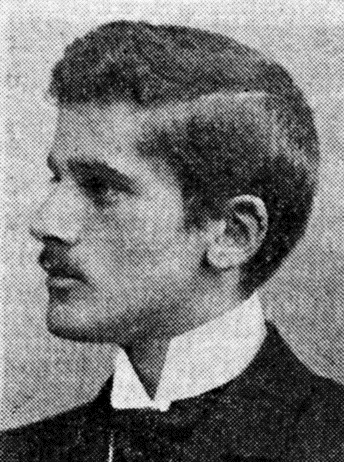
Portrait of Christian Hilt

Christian Gottlieb Hilt (29 January 1888 – 5 August 1958) was a Norwegian newspaper editor and politician for the Labour and Communist parties.

Hilt was born in Bergen, and started studies in 1906 but left the higher education system after a couple of years. He instead became subeditor in the newspaper Smaalenenes Social-Demokrat, and was acting editor-in-chief from 1910 to 1911. Hilt then worked in Den 1ste Mai, Bratsberg-Demokraten and Social-Demokraten. In 1914, he was hired in Fremtiden, where he was promoted to subeditor in October, and in 1916 he was hired in Ny Tid where he became editor in 1918. Already in 1919, Hilt left Ny Tid to become a manager in the news bureau Arbeidernes Pressekontor. He was also a delegate at the Fourth Comintern Congress in 1922, and participated in the 4th and 7th Enlarged Plenums of the Executive Committee of the Comintern in 1926 and 1927.

In 1923, Hilt broke away from the Labour Party, joining the Communist Party. He was elected party secretary in 1925, and was a politburo member from 1926 to 1929. He had two spells as editor-in-chief for Norges Kommunistblad, from July 1926 to the spring of 1927 and from the autumn 1927 to 1929. The hiatus came because Hilt stayed in the Soviet Union for a period. Around 1926–1927, he also served on the editorial board of Proletaren. Hilt then stayed in the Soviet Union from 1929 to 1936, where he did various work for Comintern, and was a correspondent for newspapers all over Scandinavia. In 1937, Hilt returned to Norway as secretary of a Norway–Soviet friendship association. He also edited a communist periodical Nytt Land from 1937 to 1940.

During the occupation of Norway by Nazi Germany, Hilt was a member of the Norwegian resistance movement. He was described by Heinrich Fehlis in an August 1940 edition of Meldungen aus Norwegen. When the illegal newspaper Friheten started in 1941, Hilt edited it together with Erling Heiestad. The newspaper was stenciled, and published fortnightly. Hilt also edited Radio-Nytt. While Heiestad was arrested in 1941, Hilt made good his escape to neutral Sweden.

After the war, Hilt was again secretary of a new Norway–Soviet friendship association. He died in August 1958, and is buried at Østre Aker.

Media offices
Preceded by Bjørn Evje	Chief editor of Smaalenenes Socialdemokrat (acting); 1910–1911	Succeeded by P. Moe-Johansen
Preceded by Martin Tranmæl	Chief editor of Ny Tid; 1918–1919	Succeeded by Knut Olai Thornæs
Preceded by Olav Scheflo	Chief editor of Norges Kommunistblad; 1926–1927	Succeeded by Albin Eines
Preceded by Albin Eines	Chief editor of Norges Kommunistblad; 1927–1929	Succeeded by Arvid G. Hansen
