= Otto Luihn =

Norwegian newspaper editor, magazine editor and poet

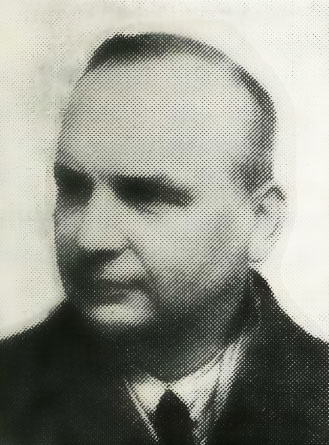
- Born: 15 March 1890; Drammen, Norway
- Died: 3 March 1943 (aged 52)
- Occupations: Newspaper editor, magazine editor and poet

Otto Luihn (15 March 1890 – 3 March 1943) was a Norwegian newspaper editor, magazine editor and poet.

== Early life ==
He was born as Otto Killingland in Drammen as a son of attorney Samuel Killingland (1841–1910) and Johanne Louise Luihn (1856–1906), and a grandson of Hans Jacob Luihn. Luihn finished middle school in 1906, and worked a couple of years at sea. In 1913 he married Marie Langlotz (1893–1969).

== Career ==
Luihn worked for the anarchist magazine Storm from 1909. He was a journalist for Klassekampen, then for Social-Demokraten from 1914 to 1916, editor-in-chief for the Stavanger newspaper Den 1ste Mai, then journalist for the Bergen newspaper Arbeidet from 1919 to 1923. Joining the Communist Party in 1923, he worked for Norges Kommunistblad from 1923 to 1927. He was the first editor of the weekly magazine Arbeidermagasinet from 1927. In the same year he was imprisoned (five weeks of detention, without conviction) together with Henry W. Kristiansen, Just Lippe and Albin Eines, after a police raid in the Communist Party offices. He was also the writer behind Sjurs Sjursen vil bli kapitalist, a satirical comic strip illustrated by Bjarne Restan, which appeared in the same magazine.

He edited Arbeidermagasinet until February 1931, and set out to mold it into an entertainment magazine with a connection to the labour movement. For enlightenment purposes they ran a column named Kjente menn innen arbeiderklassen ("Famous Men of the Working Class"), and in 1931 Luihn released Arbeidernes fremmedordbok ("Workers' Dictionary of Foreign Words"). He also released the poetry collection Dikt in 1930.

Luihn spent the year 1931 to 1932 studying in the Soviet Union. In 1933 he fielded in the general election as ninth ballot candidate for the Communist Party in Akershus. From the same year he edited the magazine Arbeider-Revy, which was officially an organ for the organization Arbeiderforfatteres forening, which he started. It has been called social realistic, and was heavily inspired by Komintern and the Soviet Union, which Luihn admired. He also wrote three books to testify this admiration: Sovjetunionen. Oplevelser og inntrykk (1933), Centralasia under Sovjetstjernen (1934) and Ukraine. På opdagerferd i den tredjestørste Sovjetrepublikk (1936). He defended the Moscow Trials, but nonetheless defected from the Communist Party to the Labour Party in 1937. He wrote in Arbeidermagasinet and Arbeiderbladet now and then, and was also the first chairman in the trade union Illustrert presses forfattere. He had also been a member of the Norwegian secretariat of International Revolutionary Writers.

During the occupation of Norway by Nazi Germany in 1942, he was arrested by Gestapo on 17 May 1942. He was incarcerated at Bredtveit concentration camp from 8 June to 24 September 1942. After being released he fled to Sweden. He died from a heart ailment in March 1943 in Stockholm.

== Published books ==
- Sovjetunionen. Oplevelser og inntrykk (1933)
- Centralasia under Sovjetstjernen (1934)
- Ukraine. På opdagerferd i den tredjestørste Sovjetrepublikk (1936)
