= Arvid G. Hansen =

Norwegian newspaper editor and politician

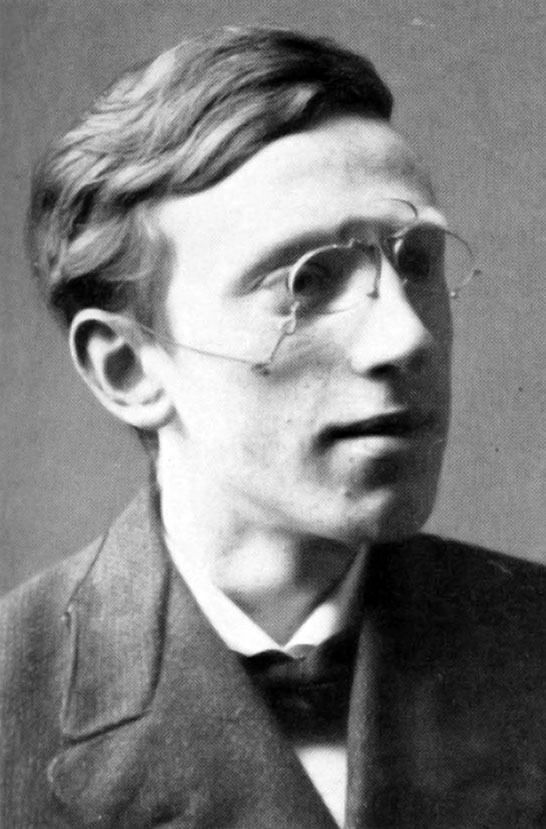
- Born: May 5, 1894; Kristiansand, Norway
- Died: January 24, 1966 (aged 71); Oslo, Norway
- Education: Communist University of the National Minorities of the West
- Occupations: Politician, journalist
- Political party: Communist Party of Norway (1923-1949)
- Other political affiliations: Labour Party (1910-1923)
- Spouses: Asborg Rise née Iversen; Aase Anette Halvorsen (m. 1940; div. 1951) Valborg Svensson (m. 1931, divorced) Mirjiam Rathus (m. 1921; div. 1928) Gunhild Vold (m. 1916; died 1920)
- Parent(s): Andreas Hansen; Gulli Bru

Arvid Gilbert Hansen (5 May 1894 – 24 January 1966) was a Norwegian newspaper editor and politician for the Labour and Communist parties.

== Early life and Labour Party career ==
He was born in Kristiansand as a tinsmith's son. He spent his entire youth in Bergen, before moving to Stavanger where he took the examen artium in 1913 as a private candidate. He then studied philology for two years at the Royal Frederick University, but quit the studies. He had joined Norges Socialdemokratiske Ungdomsforbund in 1910, and was secretary from 1915 and acting editor of Klassekampen in 1916. He then chaired the organization for one year. From 1917 to 1919 he was editor-in-chief of the Labour Party newspaper Akershus Social-Demokrat, and from 1921 to 1923 he edited the party's ideological periodical Det 20de Århundre. From 1921 to 1928 he was married to Mirjiam Rathus (who subsequently married Henry Wilhelm Kristiansen).In 1923 he took over Klassekampen again, returning to Norges Socialdemokratiske Ungdomsforbund to strengthen the left wing there.

He was also involved in socialist schooling. He wrote several books and pamphlets in this period. Haandbog i lags- og studiearbeidet (with Reinert Torgeirson, 1916) was the first handbook of its kind. Skolen, kirken og dogmerne (1915) and Kampen for religionsfrihet (1918) were critical to the religious situation. Also in 1923 he wrote the propagandistic history book Den røde ungdom i kamp og seier. Norges kommunistiske ungdomsforbund gjennem 20 aar together with Eugène Olaussen and Aksel Zachariassen.

== Communist Party career ==
In 1923 the communists in the Labour Party broke away to form the Communist Party, and Hansen became a leading figure. Except for the period 1924 to 1926, he avidly followed Comintern. He edited the magazine Proletaren, then the newspaper Norges Kommunistblad in 1929 (before it went defunct) and then Arbeideren from 1929 to 1931. From 1931 to 1935 he stayed in Moscow where he educated Scandinavians in the party line. In 1936 he returned to Norway to edit Arbeidet. From 1937 the work became harder as the Communist Party prioritized Arbeideren financially. Johanna Bugge Olsen took over as editor in 1938.

During the occupation of Norway by Nazi Germany from 1940 to 1945 Hansen was exiled in Sweden. In 1949 he was notably excluded from the Communist Party, as a supporter of the former party leader Peder Furubotn who had fallen from grace.

== Later life ==
He continued releasing books. In 1949 he edited Boligreising i Norge og andre land and in 1953 he wrote Boligkooperasjon i Norden, both on the housing question. In 1960 he wrote a book about laborers in Norwegian poetry, Arbeideren i norsk diktning fra Wergeland til i dag. Hansen was married five times. He died in January 1966 in Oslo.
