= Jens Galaaen =

Norwegian newspaper editor and politician (1893–1963)

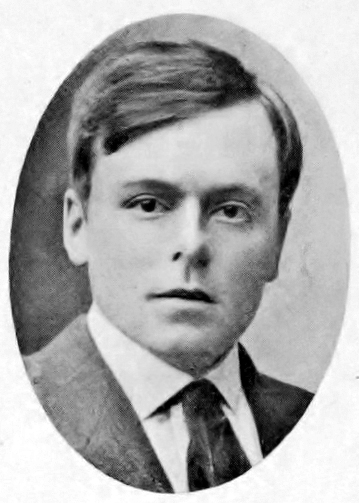
Jens Galaaen

Jens Galaaen (25 April 1893 – 13 May 1963) was a Norwegian newspaper editor and politician for the Labour and Communist parties.

He was born in Røros Municipality as a son of farmers. He contributed to the local Labour newspaper Arbeidets Rett from a young age, and edited the newspaper from 1919 to 1923. He was also imprisoned from 1918 to 1919 for being a conscientious objector.

In 1923 he broke away from the Labour Party, joining the Communist Party. He was a journalist in Buskerud-Arbeideren from 1924 to 1925, edited Møre Arbeiderblad from 1925 to 1929 and Arbeidet from 1929. In 1932 he was again imprisoned, this time for six months.

He defended the Moscow processes in Klassekampen in 1937. In 1938 he edited the book Norske frivillige i Spania. En dokumentasjon om antifascistiske frontkjempere i Spania, about Norwegian volunteers in the Spanish Civil War. Adam Egede-Nissen, Lise Lindbæk and Nordahl Grieg also contributed.

During the Second World War he was involved in the calamities around Peder Furubotn. In 1941 he was dispatched by the central committee of the Communist Party to relieve Furubotn of his position as party secretary in Western Norway. This did not happen; instead the Western Norway party branch excluded Galaaen from the party.

Media offices
Preceded by Reinert Torgeirson	Chief editor of Arbeidet; 1929–	Succeeded by
