= Bentsen =

Bentsen is a Danish surname, and it means 'son of Bendt' which is a Danish nickname for Benedict. Notable people with the surname include:

- Beint Bentsen (1917–2003), Norwegian banker and politician for the Christian Democratic Party
- Christen Bentsen Schaaning (1616–1679), priest at Avaldsnes in Norway from 1635 to 1679
- Erling Bentsen (1897–1962), Norwegian newspaper editor and politician for the Labour and Communist parties
- Ivar Bentsen (1876–1943), Danish architect
- Lloyd Bentsen (1921–2006), four-term United States senator (1971–1993) from Texas and 1988 vice presidential nominee
- William Bentsen (1930–2020), American sailor and Olympic champion

== See also ==
- Bentzen
- Bendiksen
- Benteng (disambiguation)
- Bentes
