= Proletaren =

Magazine published by the Communist Party of Norway

Proletaren (meaning The Proletarian in English) was a Norwegian periodical published by the Communist Party.

== History and profile ==
Proletaren was started in September 1923 during the fraction in-fighting in the Labour Party which resulted in the breakaway of the Communist Party. Its purpose was to deliver ideological articles to party members. The first editor-in-chief was Hans Heggum, with Arvid G. Hansen and Jørgen Vogt as co-editors.

The periodical was never issued fortnightly as was the plan. The periodical stalled around March 1924, but returned in July 1924 with Eugène Olaussen as new editor-in-chief. The next issue came one and a half month later, and Olaussen even had to take Arvid G. Hansen and Haavard Langseth on board as editors in the autumn because of illness. Hansen and Olaussen were pressured to leave in late 1925. The new editorial board consisted of Langseth, Halvor Sørum and Christian Hilt, but Hansen returned as editor-in-chief in September 1926. Heggum and Sverre Krogh were taken on board, before they all were replaced by a new editor Henry W. Kristiansen, who sat from October 1927 to the periodical went defunct in 1929.

The party had two other periodicals around the same time: Klassekampen for the Young Communist League of Norway, and Gnisten for women's affairs.
