= Øystein Sørensen =

Norwegian historian (born 1954)

- Born: 17 October 1954 (age 70); Strømmen
- Citizenship: Norwegian
- Scientific career
- Fields: history of ideas (totalitarianism, (liberalism, nationalism, national socialism); World War II history
- Institutions: University of Oslo

Øystein Sørensen (born 17 October 1954) is a Norwegian historian. A professor at the University of Oslo since 1996, he has published several books on the history of ideas, including Norwegian nationalism and national socialism, as well as general Norwegian World War II history.

Born at Strømmen, he took the cand.philol. degree in 1981. His main inspiration for studying history was Jens Arup Seip and his inclination towards incorporating the history of ideas in general history. He published his first major work in 1983—the book Fra Marx til Quisling. Fem sosialisters vei til NS. The book is a portrait of five Norwegian socialists who in the interwar period became national socialists: Eugène Olaussen, Sverre Krogh, Halvard Olsen, Albin Eines and Håkon Meyer. He then turned to Norwegian 19th-century history with the 1984 book 1880-årene. 10 år som rystet Norge, marking the 100th anniversary of the introduction of parliamentarianism in Norway. Crossing 19th-century history with liberalism was the 1988 thesis Anton Martin Schweigaards politiske tenkning, on the ideology of politician Anton Martin Schweigaard. This work earned him the dr.philos. degree. He subsequently wrote two other works on right-wing extremism and national socialism in Norway: Hitler eller Quisling? Ideologiske brytninger i Nasjonal Samling 1940–45 (1989) and Solkors og solidaritet. Høyreautoritær samfunnstenkning i Norge ca. 1930–1945 (1991). One thread from the latter book—welfare policy—was followed in the 1993 Verdenskrig og velferd. Britiske, tyske og norske sosialpolitiske planer under annen verdenskrig. Sørensen also contributed to the Norsk krigsleksikon 1940–45, a 1995 encyclopaedia on World War II in Norway. He was promoted to professor at the University of Oslo in 1996. Sørensen is an elected member of the Norwegian Academy of Science and Letters since 2010.

In 1993 and 1997 he biographed Fridtjof Nansen and Bjørnstjerne Bjørnson respectively. This was a gateway to the topic of nationalism, and Sørensen headed a research project on the emergent Norwegian national identity in the 19th century. The project resulted in the 1998 book Jakten på det norske. Perspektiver på utviklingen av en norsk nasjonal identitet på 1800-tallet; Sørensen was the editor and wrote the opening chapter, Hegemonikamp om det norske, where he identified fourteen distinct projects of nation building in Norway between 1770 and 1945.

Between 2001 and 2003, Sørensen was a co-editor, together with Trond Berg Eriksen, of the work Norsk idéhistorie. Sørensen wrote volume three of the work, Kampen om Norges sjel 1770–1905, and co-wrote the sixth and last volume Et lite land i verden together with Trond Berg Eriksen. In 2004 he was the co-editor of Et rettferdig oppgjør? with Hans Fredrik Dahl, a work on the legal purge in Norway after World War II. Historien om det som ikke skjedde, published in the same year, revolves around various counterfactual history events. Two years later, he published Den store sammensvergelsen. Historien om det hemmelige selskapet Illuminatus og dets mange ugjerninger, about the many theories concerning the secret society Illuminati. In 2010, he published a book on totalitarian ideologies, entitled Drømmen om det fullkomne samfunn.

Sørensen is also considered an international expert on the Donald Duck universe, and was behind the publishing of the complete, thirty-volume works of Carl Barks in Norwegian, Swedish and Danish in 2004. Sørensen's expertise also includes the world of The Phantom, and he was actively involved with the publishing of twenty volumes chronicling the different generations of Phantoms, each separate volume featuring a scholarly article, written by Sørensen, summarising the relevant historical themes.
