= Gnisten =

Norwegian periodical by the Communist Party (1925–1930)

Gnisten ("The Spark") was a Norwegian periodical published by the Communist Party.

Gnisten was started in March 1925 after a lengthy fund-raising campaign. It was started by women in the Communist Party who were not satisfied with the coverage of women's affairs in the Communist Party newspapers, such as Norges Kommunistblad. The periodical did reasonably well under its first editor Jeanette Olsen, and avoided financial problems in the first years. The periodical faced a steep decline when Olsen left the Communist Party and Gnisten in early 1928. The issues came more sporadically, and financial problems rose until the periodical went defunct in 1930.

The party had two other periodicals around the same time: Klassekampen for the Young Communist League of Norway, and Proletaren for ideological articles. Gnisten was also the name of a handwritten newspaper issued by the communist housewives' association in Ålesund.
