= Bentzen =

Bentzen is a surname. Notable people with the surname include:

- Amund Nøkleby Bentzen (1903–1969), Norwegian priest and politician
- Bent-Joacim Bentzen (born 1991), Norwegian politician
- Carl Severin Bentzen (1882–1956), Norwegian tailor and politician
- Erling Bentzen (1897–1962), Norwegian newspaper editor and politician
- Hulda Marie Bentzen (1858–1930), Norwegian photographer
- Jens Dall Bentzen (born 1968), Danish engineer
- Torfinn Bentzen (1912–1986), Norwegian jurist and sports official

== See also ==
- Bentsen
