= Alfred Madsen =

Norwegian politician

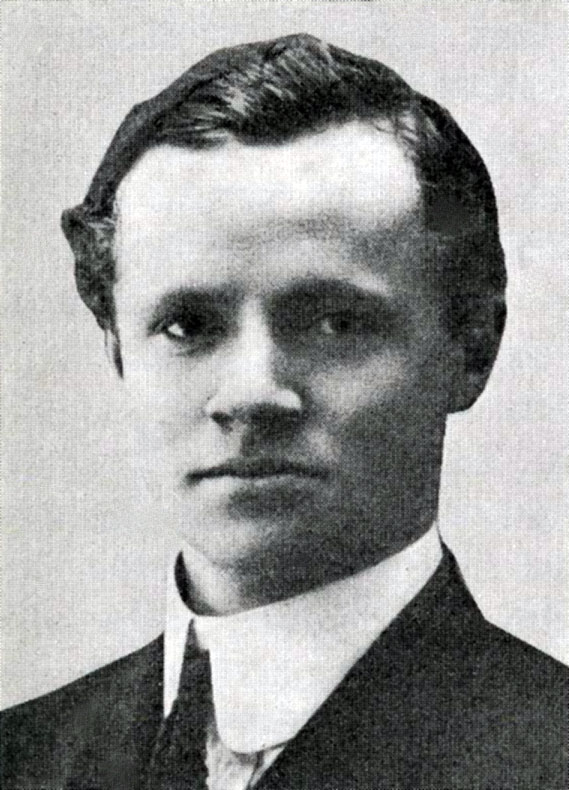

Member of the Norwegian Parliament
- In office 1 January 1921 – 4 December 1945 (de facto: 1940)
- Constituency: Akershus

Minister of Social Affairs
- In office 28 January 1928 – 15 February 1928
- Prime Minister: Christopher Hornsrud
- Preceded by: Peter Morell
- Succeeded by: Torjus Værland

Minister of Trade
- In office 20 March 1935 – 1 July 1939
- Prime Minister: Johan Nygaardsvold
- Preceded by: Lars O. Meling
- Succeeded by: Trygve Lie

Personal details
- Born: Alfred Martin Madsen; 10 April 1888 Bergen, Hordaland, United Kingdoms of Sweden and Norway
- Died: 8 May 1962 (aged 74) Bærum, Akershus, Norway
- Party: Labour
- Spouse: Anna Fagerhaug (m. 1914)
- Occupation: Newspaper editor Trade union secretary
- Profession: Lithographer; Engineer

Alfred Martin Madsen (10 April 1888 – 8 May 1962) was a Norwegian engineer, newspaper editor, trade unionist and politician for the Norwegian Labour Party. He began as deputy chairman of their youth wing, while also working as an engineer. In the 1910s he rose in the hierarchy of the party press, and eventually in the Labour Party and the Confederation of Trade Unions as well. He was an important party and trade union strategist in the 1920s. He served six terms in the Norwegian Parliament, and was the parliamentary leader of his party for many years. He was twice a member of the national cabinet, as Minister of Social Affairs in 1928 and Minister of Trade from 1935 to 1939.

== Early life ==
Madsen was born in 1888 in Bergen as the son of carpenter Simon Madsen (1857–1928) and Hansine Christensen Skiftesvig (1857–1890). He graduated from middle school in 1904, and took an education as a lithographer and engineer between 1904 and 1910. He worked as an engineer in Montreal and New York City between 1910 and 1912, and in Germany between 1913 and 1914. In 1912, during an intermittent stay in Norway, he had become active in Norges Socialdemokratiske Ungdomsforbund, and became acquainted to Martin Tranmæl. Madsen was soon elected chairman of the Norges Socialdemokratiske Ungdomsforbund. While staying in Germany, he had written articles for the newspaper Ny Tid, where Tranmæl was the editor-in-chief. In 1914 he married Anna Fagerhaug.

== Political career ==
Upon his return to Norway in 1914, Madsen became editor-in-chief of Tidens Krav in Kristiansund. At the national Labour Party convention in 1915, Madsen was a candidate for the position as party secretary, but long-time party secretary Magnus Nilssen won the vote. The radical wing of Madsen, Tranmæl and others later assumed control over the party at the national convention in 1918. Having worked in Rjukan from 1917 to 1918, Madsen was hired as subeditor of the newspaper Arbeidet in 1919. In 1920 he was promoted within the system, becoming editor-in-chief of Ny Tid. He was a member of the Labour Party national board from 1919 to 1920, and of the central committee from 1920 to 1935. He was also a secretary in the Norwegian Confederation of Trade Unions, and was known as a supporting figure of chairman Ole O. Lian. He was also known as a splendid public speaker and political writer. He published several pamphlets in the years around 1920, including 1917's Taylor-systemet: videnskabelig ledelse av industriene, an exploration of scientific management.

In the election of 1921 Madsen was elected to the Norwegian Parliament from the constituency Akershus. In 1923, the Labour Party suffered a split due to disagreements over their membership in the Comintern as well as the Twenty-one Conditions. When the Labour Party left the Comintern, the Communist Party broke away, but Madsen remained with Labour. Leaving the Comintern allowed the Labour Party to reconcile with the Social Democratic Labour Party, which had broken away in 1921. Madsen helped orchestrate the reunification between these parties in 1927. He also led the committee that wrote the 1927 election manifesto. He had been re-elected in 1924 and 1927, and chaired the parliamentary group of the Labour Party during this period. In 1928 he was selected as Minister of Social Affairs in the short-lived cabinet Hornsrud.

In 1931 he left the position as parliamentary leader as he was elected deputy chairman as well as treasurer of the Confederation of Trade Unions. He held this position until 1934. However, he did continue in the Norwegian Parliament, being elected in 1930, 1933 and 1936. He represented Oslo for the last four terms in Parliament. On 20 March 1935, when the cabinet Nygaardsvold assumed office, Madsen was appointed Norwegian Minister of Trade, Shipping, Industry, Craft and Fisheries. At the same time he left the central committee. Unlike the cabinet Hornsrud, the cabinet Nygaardsvold survived for a long period. Madsen resigned in the summer of 1939; his last day as Minister was on 30 June. He found a new job as an administrator of stamped paper.

He was still a member of Parliament, and returned as parliamentary leader in 1939. However, only months before the next election was scheduled, Norway was invaded and subsequently occupied by Germany as a part of World War II, effectively suspending the Parliament. In December 1940 Madsen was arrested by the Gestapo. He was imprisoned at Møllergata 19 until 15 May 1941. In August 1942 he lost his job as stamped paper administrator, and between 16 November 1942 and 16 May 1943 he was imprisoned for the second time, serving time at Bredtveit concentration camp and Åkebergveien. He did not recover his civil job until 8 May 1945, the day of the liberation. He had also been a member of the board of the Bank of Norway since 1930, but this was suspended during the German occupation.

He left politics after World War II. He died in 1962 in Bærum.

Political offices
Preceded by Peter A. A. Morell	Norwegian Minister of Social Affairs; January 1928–February 1928	Succeeded by Torjus Værland
Preceded by Lars Olai Meling	Norwegian Minister of Trade, Shipping, Industry, Craft and Fisheries; 1935–1939	Succeeded by Trygve Lie
Media offices
Preceded by Knut Olai Thornæs	Chief editor of Ny Tid; 1920	Succeeded by Knut Olai Thornæs
