= Jørgen Vogt =

Norwegian newspaper editor and politician (1900–1972)

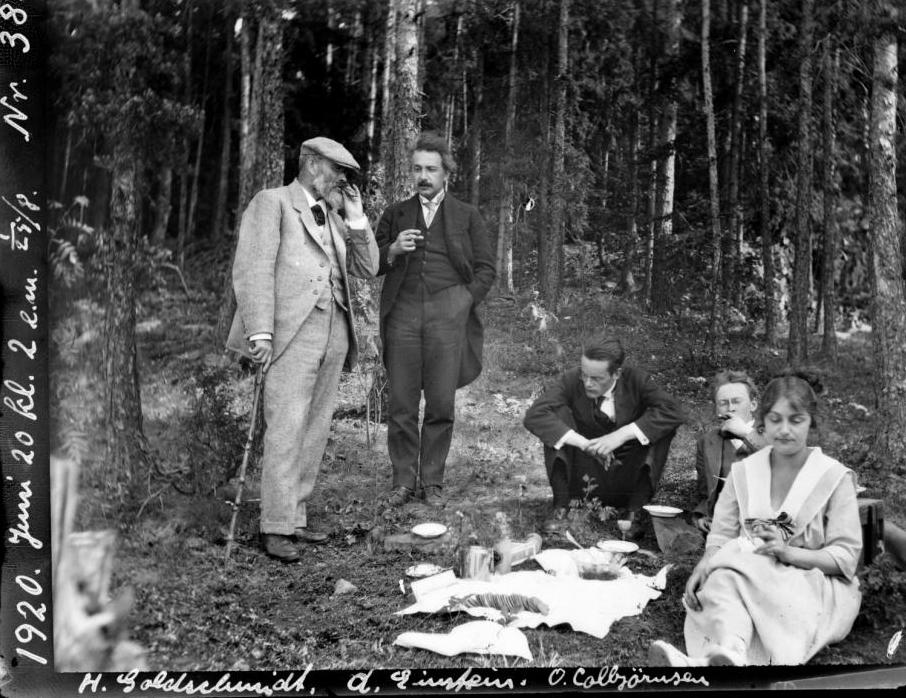
- From left: Heinrich Jacob Goldschmidt, Albert Einstein, Ole Colbjørnsen, Jørgen Vogt, and Ilse Einstein, June 1920 at Oslofjord

Member of Parliament
- In office 1945–1949

Personal details
- Born: 23 September 1900 Kristiania
- Died: 3 August 1972
- Party: Communist
- Relations: Johan Herman Lie Vogt (father); Thorolf Vogt (brother); Fredrik Vogt (brother); Johan Herman Vogt (brother); Ragnar Vogt (uncle)
- Occupation: Newspaper editor Political secretary

Jørgen Herman Vogt (23 September 1900 – 3 August 1972) was a Norwegian newspaper editor and politician representing the Communist Party. He edited the newspapers Ny Tid and Friheten, served four terms in Trondheim city council and one term in the Norwegian Parliament.

== Personal life ==
Vogt was born in Kristiania as the son of professor of metallurgy Johan Herman Lie Vogt (1858–1932) and his wife Martha Johanne Abigael Kinck (1861–1908). He was the brother of geologist Thorolf Vogt, Norwegian Water Resources and Energy director Fredrik Vogt and economist Johan Herman Vogt. His uncle Ragnar Vogt was a professor of medicine; as was his second cousin, who was named Jørgen Herman Vogt as well. His great-grandfather David Vogt was a politician whose brother, also a politician, was also named Jørgen Herman Vogt.

== Career ==
Vogt enrolled as a student in 1919. He also worked as a journalist from 1920 to 1923; during this period he went on study trips to Germany. From 1923 to 1924 he was the editor-in-chief of Klassekampen, the party organ of the Young Communist League of Norway. Around the same time he was on the editorial board of the periodical Proletaren. Vogt subsequently wrote for the Norges Kommunistblad from 1924 to 1927 and Arbeideren og Gudbrandsdalens Arbeiderblad from 1927 until 1929, when he was hired as a journalist in the Trondheim newspaper Ny Tid.

While living and working in Trondheim, he was elected to serve in Trondheim city council in 1934. He was re-elected in 1937. By that time he had become editor-in-chief of Ny Tid. However, the newspaper went defunct in 1939. He found new work in the city provisioning committee. However, on 9 October 1941, during the German occupation of Norway, he was imprisoned. He was incarcerated in the camps Vollan, Falstad and Grini. He was not released until 1945, when Norway was liberated from German occupation.

In the first free elections in Norway after World War II, Vogt was elected to the Parliament of Norway, representing the Market towns of Sør-Trøndelag and Nord-Trøndelag counties. He served one term. In the same year he also re-established the newspaper Ny Tid, and in 1946 he was chosen as editor-in-chief of the new party organ, Friheten. As such he was a member of the central committee of the Communist Party. He also served in Trondheim city council from 1945 to 1951.

Vogt continued as editor-in-chief of Friheten until 1967, except for a period between 1962 and 1965, when he was political secretary of the Communist Party. Vogt had moved back to his hometown Oslo, where he served as a deputy member of the city council from 1959 to 1963. Vogt was also a member of the Schei committee, which worked from 1946 to 1961 to reduce the number of municipalities of Norway. He worked as a secretary in the Norwegian Parliament for the last years of his life, and died in 1972.
