= Albin Eines =

Norwegian newspaper editor and politician (1886–1947)

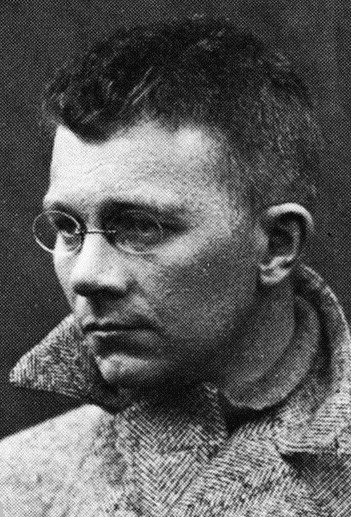

Personal details
- Born: Albin Konrad Eines; 9 June 1886 Trondheim, Norway
- Died: 19 May 1947 (aged 60) Oslo, Norway
- Party: Labour Party (Norway), Communist Party of Norway, Nasjonal Samling

Albin Konrad Eines (9 June 1886 – 19 May 1947) was a Norwegian newspaper editor and politician for the Labour and Communist Labour parties. He later became a Nazi, working for Norwegian and German Nazis during the World War II.

== Early career ==
Eines was born in Trondheim. He took a typographer and bookbinder education in Sweden, where he joined the socialist movement under Zeth Höglund. He moved back to Norway in 1909, after the Swedish General Strike. Eines was a member of Fagopposisjonen av 1911 and Norges Socialdemokratiske Ungdomsforbund, and was deputy leader for some time, but resigned his NSU membership in 1921 as he felt too old. He was a sub-editor in Klassekampen from 1911, and later worked in Vest-Finmarkens Arbeiderblad, Folkets Dagblad and Østfold Dagblad. Eines edited Folkets Dagblad (before 1921 named Nybrott) from 1919 to 1922, when sub-editor Ingjald Nordstad took over.

== Communist Party ==
In 1920, Eines announced his scepticism towards the Twenty-one Conditions. However, he changed heart and joined the Communist Party when it was split from the Labour Party in 1923. Eines started working in Ny Tid, and edited that newspaper for a short while. He was a delegate at the Fifth Comintern Congress in 1925. In the spring of 1927, Eines took over as editor of the main newspaper of the Communist Party, Norges Kommunistblad. He was absent during the summer, as he was imprisoned (five weeks of detention, without conviction) together with Henry W. Kristiansen, Just Lippe and Otto Luihn, but returned to edit the newspaper in the autumn of 1927 before Christian Hilt took over later that year.

== Right-winger ==
Eines left the Communist Party around New Years' 1927–1928. Already in 1928, he started working for the right-wing newspaper Tidens Tegn. In 1940, Eines moved to the Fascist newspaper Fritt Folk. He also joined the Fascist party Nasjonal Samling (NS). He thus found a position during the occupation of Norway by Nazi Germany, when NS and the German Nazis took over power. In March 1942, Eines was hired as sub-editor, Odd Fossum's second-in-command, on the newspaper Norsk Arbeidsliv. The newspaper belonged to the Norwegian Confederation of Trade Unions where the Nazis recently had usurped full power. In December 1943, he was promoted to editor-in-chief, and he remained so until July 1944.

In 1947, during the legal purge in Norway after World War II, Eines was convicted of treason and sentenced to four years in prison. He died in prison that same year.

Media offices
Preceded by Christian Hilt	Chief editor of Norges Kommunistblad spring 1927–autumn 1927 (Trond Hegna edited during the summer)	Succeeded by Christian Hilt
