= Arne Taraldsen =

Norwegian artist and resistance member

Arne Taraldsen (12 November 1917 – 2 August 1989) was a Norwegian artist and resistance member during the occupation of Norway by Nazi Germany. He started his drawing career with underground publications during World War II.

== Early and personal life ==
Taraldsen was born in Kristiania, as the son of Paul Egil Taraldsen and Kristine Marie. Although he attended evening classes in arts and crafts school during the 1930, he was largely self-taught. He studied for some time at the Norwegian National Academy of Craft and Art Industry.

== World War II ==
In 1940, Taraldsen participated in the fights in Northern Norway. He later joined Peder Furubotn's group of partisans in Valdres. He was a security guard at the headquarters of the Norwegian Communist Party, while he also illustrated publications issued by the Communist Party, such as underground newspapers, books, stickers, flyers and posters. He signed his illustrations with pen names such as "stjerne", "Stjernetarald", "Vidar Vangen" or "Kaare Brattaas". Among his illustrations is the front page of Asbjørn Sunde's handbook for saboteurs, and stickers for matchboxes. During the Operation Almenrausch in June 1944 Taraldsen was among the group of people who escaped from the German soldiers. The small group, including Furubotn and his family, a small baby, and Taraldsen as the machine-gunner, managed to escape through the woods while hunted by several hundred troops. Taraldsen's illustration of the incident is based on Erik Werenskiold's painting Trollene paa Hedalsskogen.

== Post-war life ==
After the war Taraldsen worked as an illustrator for the Communist newspaper Friheten and the Socialist newspaper Orientering. He has later been running an advertising agency, and has made illustrations for the tourist business, such as postcards, maps and troll figures. He died in Voss Municipality in 1989.
