= Jeanette Olsen =

Norwegian editor and politician

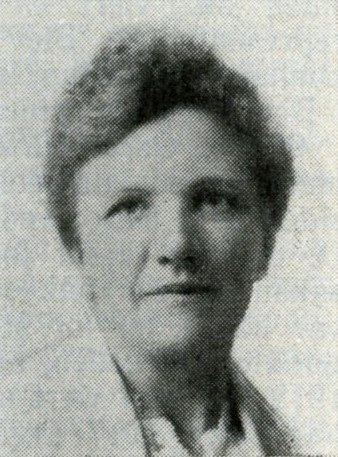
Jeanette Olsen

Jeanette Martine Olsen (22 October 1873 – 23 September 1959) was a Norwegian editor and politician for the Labour and Communist parties.

She was born in Kristiania. Her first political position was as leader of the local women's branch in Skien Labour Party from 1907 to 1912. From 1911 to 1913 she was a national board member of the Labour Party women's association. She was also a board member of the county branch in Bratsberg. In 1913 she was hired as manager of the newspaper Haugesunds Folkeblad, and she became editor-in-chief in the same year.

The family moved to Tromsø in 1914, where she became manager in Nordlys and then secretary of Nord-Norsk Fiskerforbund from 1917 to 1919. She was also a member of Tromsø city council from 1916 to 1919. In 1919 she was hired as manager in Fremover, and sat for some time as a member of the municipal council of Narvik Municipality. While living in Northern Norway she was also involved in smuggling from the Russian SFSR.

She was a national board member of the Labour Party from 1918 to 1923, and was a delegate at the Third Comintern Congress in 1921, but in September 1923 she was excluded for half a year for writing an "open letter" to Martin Tranmæl, in which she stated that if not Tranmæl subordinated himself to Comintern, he would pave way for Fascism. Before the exclusion was lifted, the Communist Party had formed as a splinter party, and she joined it. From 1923 to 1928 she led the women's secretariat in the party, succeeding Olga Andersen in that position. She was a delegate at the Fifth Comintern Congress, and also edited the party's magazine for women, Gnisten, from 1925. In 1928 she resigned her party membership, together with high-profile politicians Emil Stang, Jr. and Olav Scheflo, since the Communist Party was against the formation of Hornsrud's Cabinet. She joined the Revolusjonære fagopposisjon, Clarté and the Women's International League for Peace and Freedom. She rejoined the Communist Party in 1936, but was excluded after three months (in September) for defending Lev Trotsky. She was now a Trotskyist, and edited the periodical Oktober from April 1937 to September 1939. She also worked as a seamstress.

She was married to Aksel Olsen (1869–1928), and had seven children. She died in September 1959 in Oslo.
