= Bendtsen =

Bendtsen is a surname. Notable people with the surname include:

- Andrea West Bendtsen (born 1999), Danish handball player
- Bendt Bendtsen (born 1954), Danish politician
- Wermund Bendtsen (1917–2003), Danish professional photographer, filmmaker, and photojournalist

== See also ==
- Bentsen
