= Erling Bentzen =

Norwegian newspaper editor and politician

Erling Herolf Bentzen, sometimes given as Bentsen (8 January 1897 – 12 December 1962) was a Norwegian newspaper editor and politician for the Labour and Communist parties.

He was born in Kristiania, but moved to Sarpsborg. He joined Norges Socialdemokratiske Ungdomsforbund, by extension the Labour Party, in 1911, and sat as a county board member. He found work at Oslo Gassverk in 1915, and became a secretary of his local trade union.

In 1923 he broke away from the Labour Party, joining the new Communist Party. He was a delegate to the 7th Enlarged Plenum of the Executive Committee of the Communist International in 1926. From 1926 to 1928 he was a member of the party's politburo, and from 1927 to 1928 regional party leader in Oslo and Akershus. In 1928 he undertook studies at the International Lenin School. In 1932 he again became a member of the Communist Party politburo, and from 1932 to 1934 he edited their main newspaper Arbeideren. In 1934 he was fired for not following the directions of the Comintern, the superior organ of the Communist Party of Norway.

He was later registered as a docks worker. During the occupation of Norway by Nazi Germany, he was arrested by Gestapo on 13 September 1941 after the milk strike. He was sent to Grini concentration camp until 3 April 1942, when he was sent to Sachsenhausen concentration camp. He remained here until the end of World War II. After the war he edited Nordlands Arbeiderblad from 1949 to 1952, and then worked as a journalist in Friheten. He died in 1962.

Media offices
Preceded by Reinert Torgeirson	Chief editor of Arbeideren; 1932–1934	Succeeded by Henry W. Kristiansen
