= Torjus =

Torjus is a given name. Notable people with the given name include:

- Torjus Hansén (born 1973), Norwegian footballer
- Torjus Hemmestveit (1860–1930), Norwegian Nordic skier
- Torjus Sleen (born 1997), Norwegian racing cyclist
- Torjus Værland (1868–1954), Norwegian politician
