= Operation Almenrausch =

- Part of Second World War
Date	13-14 June 1944
Location	Valdres
Result	German failure to eliminate NKP leadership

Belligerents
Norway	Germany; Quisling regime

Commanders and leaders
Peder Furubotn	Hellmuth Reinhard

Units involved
NKP; Milorg	SS; STAPO

Strength
Unknown	At least 800 police and troops

Casualties and losses
Two killed 38 arrested, at least one of whom were later executed	None

Operation Almenrausch was a counter-resistance operation in occupied Norway, planned and carried out by the Wehrmacht and the Nazi-controlled Norwegian Statspolitiet on 13 June 1944. It was named after the Almenrausch, an "Alpine Rose" growing in continental Europe.

== The operation ==
The site of the operation was Valdres, where the banned Communist Party of Norway had a secret encampment from which their part of the Norwegian resistance was coordinated. The goal was to raid the main encampment in Skriulægeret in Nord-Aurdal Municipality and other places where resistance members might be. About 800 personnel participated in the operation.

Leading communist figure Peder Furubotn escaped, so did Ørnulf Egge, Samuel Titlestad and Roald Halvorsen. The Germans got their hand on a sizeable amount of secret documents. Eight communists were arrested; one of them was later executed.

Thirty other people were arrested during the operation, as the attacking forces hit non-communist resistance fighters as well. Notably, a skirmish occurred in the valley Tapptjerndalen on 14 June, where five Milorg members were surprised and two of them were killed.

== Attack, escape and captures ==
In June 1944 Furubotn and his men were on the move. They had left Skriulægeret, and were temporarily installed at Buahaugen and Rabalden in Øystre Slidre, around twenty persons altogether. On 13 June two visitors from Oslo had been brought to the camp for a conference with the central leaders. Two of the women (Eli Aanjesen and Bergljot Løiten) walked over to another cabin about 300 metres (980 ft) apart, in order to get some more food, and there they were surprised by German troops and captured. Einar Støreng, who had been out on a mission, was surprised by Germans troops on his way back and tried to run away, but was captured after gun fire. The gun fire alarmed the remaining group at Buahaugen and Rabalden, and they made a hasty breaking up. A small group of eleven people successfully escaped, including Furubotn, his wife Gina, his daughter Magda and her three months old baby Vigdis, and seven other men. Titlestad and Arne Taraldsen were security people, armed with a revolver and machine gun. The group managed to escape through the forests, and the Communist Party later established new headquarters, first at Åstad in Vestre Slidre Municipality, and later at Hoverud near Fagernes. Among the other persons at the camp, Halvorsen managed to escape and continued his resistance work, first in Oslo and later in Sweden. Olaug Karlsen, Titlestad's girlfriend and later wife, was captured by the Germans and incarcerated at Grini concentration camp. Her sister Leikny was shot and wounded by the Germans, and brought to a local hospital, from where she later escaped. Asle Grepp, son of Kyrre and Rachel Grepp, was brought to Akershus Fortress and executed on 10 February 1945.

== Legacy ==
Based on Samuel Titlestad's autobiography and other sources, notably Meldungen aus Norwegen, Operation Almenrausch was made into a play by Tore Vagn Lid. It premièred at Agder Teater in October 2008. The play Operasjon Almenrausch received the Hedda Award for 2009, category "Event of the year" (in Norwegian: Årets begivenhet).
