= Nordland Arbeiderblad =

Norwegian newspaper

- Launched: October 1931
- Ceased publication: August 1940; October 1958
- Relaunched: July 1945
- Political alignment: Communist Party of Norway
- Language: Norwegian
- City: Narvik
- Country: Norway

Nordland Arbeiderblad was a Norwegian newspaper, published in Narvik in Nordland county.

Nordland Arbeiderblad was started in October 1931 as the Communist Party of Norway organ in the vicinity. It was published twice a week. It was not issued during the German occupation of Norway from 1940 to 1945, more specifically after August 1940 when the Communist Party was outlawed. The newspaper resurfaced in July 1945, and lasted until October 1958. Before its demise, it was the third last of the Communist Party newspapers, leaving only Friheten and Ny Tid.

Editors-in-chief include Gotfred Johan Hølvold from 1934 to 1936 and Erling Bentzen from 1949 to 1952.
