= Roald Halvorsen =

Norwegian politician (1914–2010)

Deputy Leader of the Socialist Electoral League
- In office 1975–1976
- Preceded by: Berge Furre (as deputy leader responsible for political work); Per Eggum Mauseth (as deputy leader responsible for organisational work)
- Succeeded by: Berit Ås and Steinar Stjernø

Chairman of the Central Committee of the Young Communist League of Norway
- In office 1945–1946
- Preceded by: Ørnulf Egge
- Succeeded by: Einar Andreassen

Personal details
- Born: 17 February 1914 Oslo, Norway
- Died: 18 October 2010 (aged 96) Norway
- Party: Communist Party; Socialist Left Party
- Profession: Typographer

Roald Halvorsen (17 February 1914 – 18 October 2010) was a Norwegian typographer, Communist Party politician and resistance member from World War II.

He finished his typographer's education before World War II, and was a board member of his local union in Oslo, Oslo Typografiske Fagforening. He was not a member of any political party. During the German occupation of Norway in World War II, Halvorsen joined the communist part of the Norwegian resistance movement in 1942. In March 1942 he got a warning that the German police had tried to contact him at his home, and started to live undercover. When he disappeared from the police, his wife Fanny was incarcerated at the Grini concentration camp for sixteen months, as a hostage. Halvorsen participated in the production of the underground newspaper Avantgarden, which reached a peak circulation of 18,000 in 1942. Avantgarden was printed in Oslo. Halvorsen was responsible for the type-setting, and during the summer and autumn 1942 this was done from a summer hut at the beach Bestemorstranda at the eastern side of Bunnefjorden. During the winter 1942–1943 he operated from a hut annex at Krokskogen. He later worked out of Skriulægeret in Valdresfjella, in the central headquarters of the communist resistance. The encampment was raided by the German occupiers in Operation Almenrausch in June 1944, but Halvorsen escaped. He fled to Sweden and was a part of the Communist Party leadership-in-exile there. In 1988 he was an editor and contributor to the book De trykte illegale avisene, about the illegal press during the war.

After the end of the war he became chairman of the Young Communist League of Norway. He served as a deputy representative to the Parliament of Norway from Akershus during the term 1945–1949. In total he met during 66 days of parliamentary session. He was the vice chairman of the Communist Party from 1946, and doubled as manager of the party offices, but was expelled during the purge of Peder Furubotn and his supporters in 1949/1950.

He was active in trade unionism for many years. He chaired the local union in Oslo, Oslo Typografiske Fagforening from 1961, and advanced to become leader of the Norwegian Union of Typographers in 1963. When this trade union merged to form the Norwegian Graphical Union in 1967, Halvorsen became chairman there. He was the manager of the Socialist Electoral League (SV) from 1973, and deputy chairman of the new Socialist Left Party (SV) from 1975 to 1977. He died in October 2010, at the age of 96.
