= Anders Buen =

Norwegian politician (1864–1933)

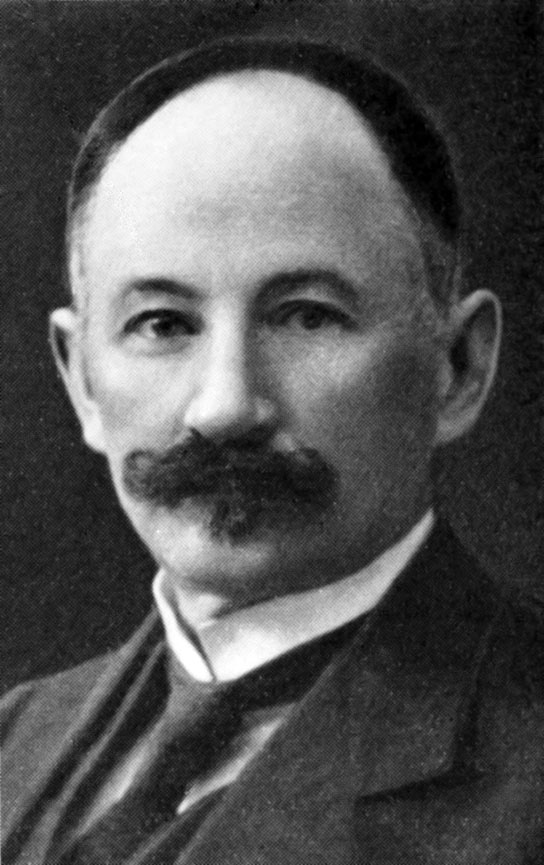
- Anders Buen

Member of Parliament
- In office 1906–1921

Personal details
- Born: 24 February 1864 Gransherad, Telemark
- Died: 17 July 1933 (aged 69)
- Party: Labour (–1921, 1927–1933); Social Democratic Labour (1921–1927)
- Occupation: Newspaper editor Bank manager
- Profession: Typographer

Anders Johnsen Buen (24 February 1864 – 17 July 1933) was a Norwegian typographer, newspaper editor, trade unionist and politician. He belonged to the Norwegian Labour Party from the start, being party secretary as well as editor of the party organs Social-Demokraten and Ny Tid, but politically he was described as a "reformist pragmatic", and was thus a member of the breakaway Social Democratic Labour Party of Norway from 1921 to 1927.

== Early life and education ==
Buen was born in Gransherad Municipality as the son of farmer Jon Olsen Buen (1823–1906) and his wife Aslaug Olsdatter (1826–1906). He finished primary school, and attended a secondary school in Vang Municipality in Hedmark for two years, before entering an apprenticeship as a book printer at W.C. Fabritius in Kristiania in 1879. He then educated himself, and worked, as a typographer.

== Labour movement ==
In 1885, Buen was among the founders of the association Socialdemokratisk Forening. The association took control over the newspaper Vort Arbeide ('Our Work'), founded in 1884 by Christian Holtermann Knudsen, and Buen was hired there as a journalist. The name was changed from Vort Arbeide to Social-Demokraten ('The Social Democrat') in 1886. Buen was appointed editor-in-chief of Social-Demokraten in 1900, and as this was the main organ for the Labour Party, Buen became party secretary as well. He also chaired his local trade union from 1897 to 1898, and served one term in Kristiania city council from 1901 to 1903.

In 1903, a conflict in the party forced the retreat of Buen as editor-in-chief. He was also replaced as party secretary. Instead, he was sent to Trondhjem to edit the party organ in that city, Ny Tid. He served as a member of Trondhjem city council from 1907 to 1910 and from 1913 to his death. He was also elected to the first session of the Norwegian Parliament in 1906, 1909, 1912, 1915 and 1918, representing the single-member constituency of Lademoen. He led the Labour Party parliamentary group from 1913 to 1921, and from 1919 to 1921 he served as President of the Storting.

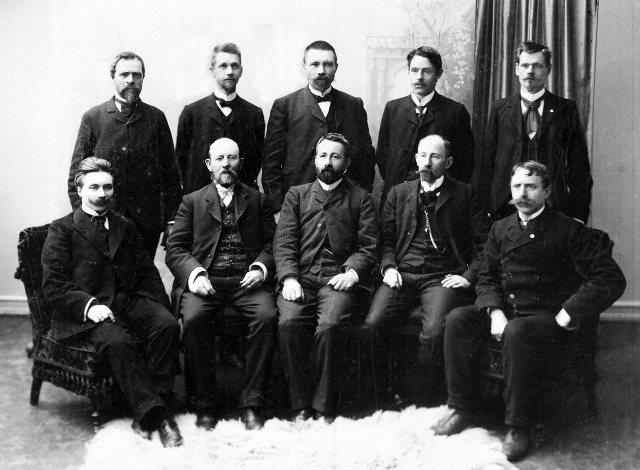
Labour parliamentary group 1906; Buen second from the right in the lower row.

In the meantime, Buen had been succeeded as editor of Ny Tid by Martin Tranmæl. Tranmæl belonged to the radical wing of the Labour Party, and in 1921, the moderate wing broke out to form the Social Democratic Labour Party of Norway, due to disagreements over the Labour Party's membership in the Comintern and adaption of the Twenty-one Conditions. Buen, described as a "reformist pragmatic", joined the Social Democratic Labour Party. From 1922 to 1927 he edited the newspaper Trøndelag Social-Demokrat, which can be considered an offshoot of Ny Tid. Labour Party had officially scrapped the Twenty-one Conditions in 1923, and in 1927 the Labour Party and the Social Democratic Labour Party reconciled and reunited. Trøndelag Social-Demokrat was disestablished, but since Ny Tid had been usurped when the Communist Party of Norway broke away from the Labour Party in 1923, the Labour Party organ in Trondhjem was now Arbeider-Avisen. Buen worked as a journalist here for a few years. He also managed the local branch of Norges Bank from 1916 to his death in 1933 and had been a member of the board of the Norwegian Water Resources and Energy Directorate from 1921 to 1923.

Party political offices
Preceded by Ludvig Meyer	Party secretary of the Labour Party; 1900–1903	Succeeded by Olav Kringen
Media offices
Preceded by Ludvig Meyer	Chief editor of Social-Demokraten; 1900–1903	Succeeded by Olav Kringen
Preceded by Ivar Angell-Olsen	Chief editor of Ny Tid; 1903–1908	Succeeded by Martin Tranmæl
Preceded by Martin Tranmæl	Chief editor of Ny Tid; 1911–1912	Succeeded by Martin Tranmæl
Political offices
Preceded by Ivar Peterson Tveiten; Fredrik Olsen Nalum; Johan Ludwig Mowinckel	President of the Storting; 1919–1921 (with others)	Succeeded by Ivar Lykke; Otto Bahr Halvorsen
