= Norsk krigsleksikon 1940–1945 =

Norwegian encyclopedia covering the Second World War

- Genre: Encyclopedia
- Publication date: 1995
- ISBN: 82-02-14138-9

Norsk krigsleksikon 1940–1945 (The Norwegian War Encyclopaedia 1940-45) is a Norwegian encyclopaedia covering the Second World War.

It was issued in 1995 by the publishing house J.W. Cappelen. The editorial staff consisted of five editors: Hans Fredrik Dahl, Guri Hjeltnes, Berit Nøkleby, Nils Johan Ringdal and Øystein Sørensen. It contains around 1,000 articles, of which around 500 are biographies.
