= Newspapers of Sunnmøre =

Newspapers published in Sunnmøre, Norway

The history of publishing newspapers in Sunnmøre, a region in Møre og Romsdal county, Norway, stretches from 1808, and is continuous to the present day. The overarching newspaper in the region is Sunnmørsposten, with a plethora of newspapers covering specific municipalities of the region.

== Ørsta and Volda ==
Historically, Ørsta and Volda were hubs for intellectual life in Western Norway. Sivert Aarflot started Landbobladet in 1808, which was the first rural newspaper in Norway. Published in Volda, Landbobladet changed its name to Postbudet in 1845 and Møringen in 1869, then Møre.

== Ålesund ==
Ålesund, then spelt Aalesund, emerged as the leading city in Sunnmøre. A cooperation between the bookseller J. Aarflot and the printer T. Zernichow led to the trade newspaper Aalesunds Handels og Søfartstidende being started in 1856. For a number of years it was called Aalesunds Tidende, reverting to the old name in 1876. Aalesunds Handels og Søfartstidende succumbed following the Ålesund fire of 1904.

Aalesunds Blad started in 1871 with a more "free-minded" outlook. It ceased publication in 1911, having been overtaken by Søndmørsposten. This newspaper had its trial issue on 30 November 1882 and aligned itself with the Liberal Party. Søndmørsposten, which later modernised its name to Sunnmørsposten, firmly established itself during Ivar Flem's long service as editor-in-chief, starting in 1984 and spanning nearly fifty years.

The temperance movement founded Totalavholdsbudet in 1883, succeeded by Søndmøre Folkeblad in 1892. It ceased in 1917, whereas Klaus Sletten tried to establish a successor Møre Tidend which lasted until 1920. At the same time, the Conservative Party managed to start Aalesunds Avis in 1917. The first editor-in-chief was Gerhard Jynge.

== Labour press ==
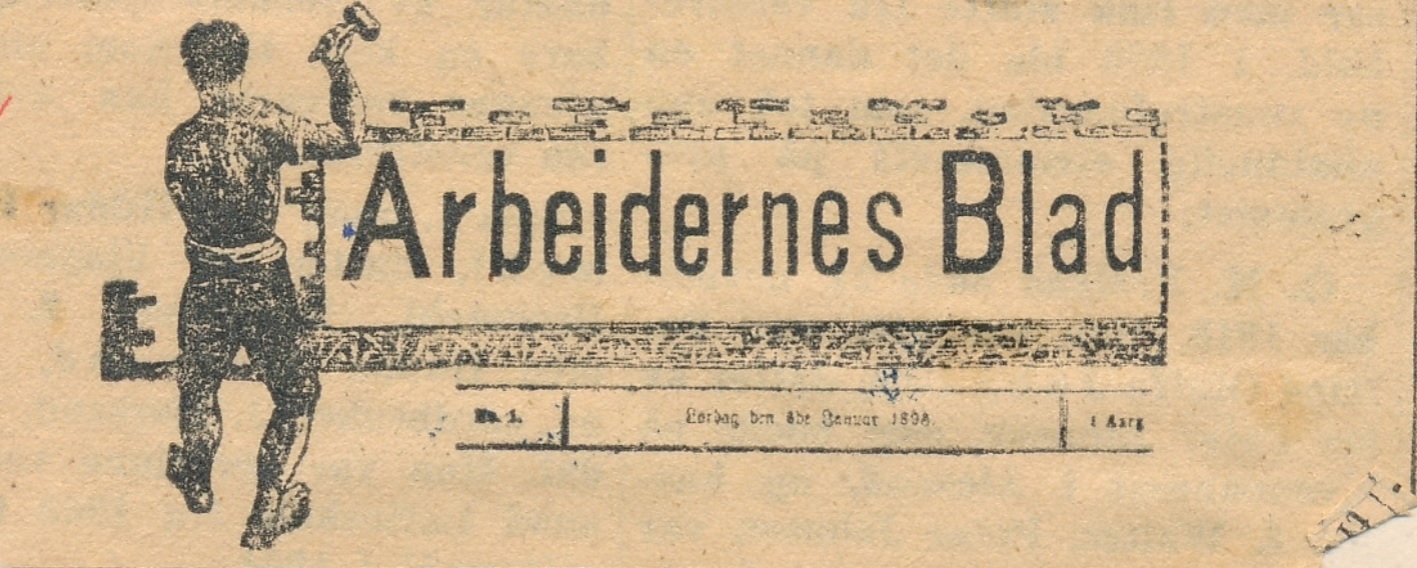
Arbeideneres blad nameplate

Arbeidernes Blad was Ålesund's first newspaper aligned with the labour movement, lasting from January to April 1898. While intending to uphold a non-partisan labourer-friendly editorial style, it soon became more cleary socialist. The editorial team was a four-member committee consisting of Bernhard Riise (chief editor), Erik Pettersen, J. Langseth and Andreas Barstad. The owner of the printing press were pressured by loan providers to waive the printing of the newspaper. Arbeidernes Blad was briefly continued by Møringen.

The Ålesund city fire of 1904 led to an influx of labourers to rebuild the city. Petter Moe-Johansen seized the opportunity to become the first editor of Nybrott, which was subsequently edited by Johan Falkberget. Nybrott went defunct in 1907 and was succeeded by Aalesunds Socialdemokrat, which lasted until 1910. The next attempt at publishing Socialisten in 1915 became even more short-lived.

In 1921, the new Social Democratic Labour Party managed to found Møre Socialdemokrat. Three years after the Social Democratic Labour Party was incorporated into the Labour Party, the "Socialdemokrat" moniker was dropped in 1930 and the title was changed to Sunnmøre Arbeideravis.

Before the Labour–Social Democratic Labour merger, Møre Arbeiderblad was started on 13 September 1923 as a newspaper with an unofficial affiliation with the Labour Party. Before the affiliation was made formal, the Communist Party broke away from Labour and took Møre Arbeiderblad with them. It henceforth served as the Communist Party organ for Sunnmøre. Well-known editors include Ålesund native Reinert Torgeirson from 1924 to 1925 and Jens Galaaen from 1925 to 1929. The newspaper came once a week, except a period from early 1924 to mid-1929 when it came twice a week. It went defunct after its last issue on 28 March 1931, and though Møre Arbeiderblad did resurface later, the details around that are little known to historians.

== Outskirts of Ålesund ==
In Sula south of Ålesund, Sulaposten was founded in 1946. It was edited and printed in Langevåg, but has to find another printing press, and was also defunct between December 1967 and November 1974. Sulaposten gained traction during the campaign to demerge Sula from Ålesund Municipality, which happened in 1977, and managed to survive as a weekly newspaper. The founder Ansgar Slagnes operated on more or less a hobby basis, with slim profits and contributors working without compensation. Shareholders were brought in from 1979, but Slagsnes returned as editor-in-chief from 1983 to 1989, resigning at age 84. Sulaposten was bought by a small consortium Sunnmørsavisene AS in 1997, then Vårt Land before it was bought by Haramsnytt (see below) in 2008. Having surpassed the 2,000 mark with a circulation of 2,413 in the year 2000, it dropped to 1,988 in 2020.

In Haram Municipality, north of Ålesund, there were three unsuccessful attempts to establish local newspapers. First, Bygdebladet existed from 1931 to 1932. Møre Bygdeblad lasted from 1932 until the German occupation of Norway in 1940 cracked down on the press. The third attempt, Vestland, became short-lived too, lasting from 1952 to 1953. As the population grew, Haramsnytt was established in 1971, changing its name to Nordre in 2013. The newspaper's office is located in the village of Brattvåg. Written in Nynorsk, Nordre is published twice a week, on Tuesdays and Fridays. As Haram Municipality was incorporated into Ålesund in 2020, it was demerged in 2024; the newspaper changed its name back to Haramsnytt on 4 January 2024. The circulation stood at 2,078 copies in 1980, 2,448 copies in 1990, 2,878 copies in 2000 and 2,707 copies in 2010.

Probably inspired by Nordre, the Ålesund-based journalist Kjell Opsal left his job in 1972 to move operations to Sjøholt in Ørskog Municipality, where he started Bygdebladet. The newspaper is written in Nynorsk and is issued on Wednesdays and Saturdays, having tried publishing three days a week in the late 1980s. The circulation stood at 3,046 copies in 1979, 3,295 in 1988, 2,540 in 1998, 2,847 in 2008 and 2,423 in 2018 (then including digital-only subscribers). The large decline after 1988 was in part due to new local newspapers emerging in Vestnes Municipality (in Romsdal) and Storfjord, where Bygdebladet had a reader base. Kjell Opsal edited the paper until 2015, when he was succeeded by Reidar Opsal.

Øy-Blikk was established in 1985 by Odd Egil Valderhaug with offices in Valderøy. It is a weekly newspaper appearing on Thursdays, published in Nynorsk. The newspaper was bought by Mediekonsernet Tvisyn in 2019, and the official spelling altered to ØyBlikk in 2023. The circulation stood at 1,838 copies in 2010 and 1,306 copies in 2020.

== Ytre Søre Sunnmøre ==
The Southern part of Sunnmøre is further divided into Inner and Outer parts, characterized by fjords and islands respectively.

== Indre Søre Sunnmøre ==
In the southwest along the county border to Sogn og Fjordane, Vanylven Municipality was enlarged through a merger. Seeing a ground for a local newspaper, Per G. Osnes founded Synste Møre in 1970, initially published out of the Osnes family's farm. After a period under the name Vest-Avisa from 1987 to 2000, they reverted to Synste Møre. The circulation was about 1,500 paper copies in the mid-1970s, rising to 2,097 in 2000. Except for a period around 2,200–2,300 around 2010, the circulation stabilized around 2,000.
