= Eugène Olaussen =

Norwegian newspaper editor and politician

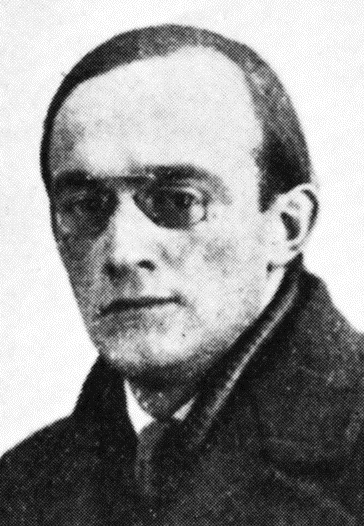

Member of the Norwegian Parliament
- In office 1922–1924
- Constituency: Buskerud

Personal details
- Born: 27 December 1887 Tønsberg, Norway
- Died: 22 January 1962 (aged 74)
- Party: Labour Party; Communist; Conservative; Nasjonal Samling

Ansgar Eugène Olaussen (27 December 1887 – 22 January 1962) was a Norwegian newspaper editor, educated as a typographer, and politician. As a politician he started in Young Communist League of Norway (Norges Socialdemokratiske Ungdomsforbund, and notably edited Klassekampen from 1911 to 1921. For the Labour Party he was county leader, central board member and MP for slightly more than a year, until he joined the Communist Party in 1923. Some years after finishing his sole term as an MP for the Communists, he shifted to the far right and associated himself with Nazism during the Second World War.

== Career in the labour movement ==
He was born in Tønsberg as a son of Hannibal Olaussen (1848–1916) and Bella Sophie Johansen (1852–1918). His father was an immigrant from Tanum, Sweden, and was a bookbinder by profession, like Eugène's older sister Anna Catharina. The family later lived in Moss. Eugène Olaussen later settled in Hokksund.

He started his working career at the age of 13, and after some years as a laborer he learned the typographer's trade. His apprenticeship was spent in newspapers like Moss Avis and Jarlsberg. In 1907 he became editor-in-chief of Ung-Socialisten, and was a central board member of the Norges Socialdemokratiske Ungdomsforbund. From 1911 to 1921 he edited the publication of NSU, Klassekampen. He recruited Nikolay Bukharin and Karl Radek to write in the newspaper, and gained a personal acquaintance with Vladimir Lenin.

In the summer of 1913 he applied unsuccessfully for the editor chair in Demokraten. Later that summer he was hired as editor-in-chief of Haugesunds Folkeblad, but he continued in Klassekampen when asked by the central board of Norges Socialdemokratiske Ungdomsforbund to do so.

In 1918 he was a part of the left wing that assumed power in the Norwegian Labour Party. He became a member of the party's central board. In 1921 NSU changed name to the Young Communist League of Norway, as the social democrats broke out of the Labour Party. In 1923 the communists broke out of the Labour Party to form the Communist Party, and the Young Communist League followed. He remained central board member here until 1924. His central board membership in the Labour Party was ended in 1923 as he joined the Communist Party, so did his time as county leader in the Labour Party since 1920. His party change came in mid-term since being elected to the Parliament of Norway in 1921.

Also in 1923 he wrote the propagandistic history book Den røde ungdom i kamp og seier. Norges kommunistiske ungdomsforbund gjennem 20 aar together with Arvid G. Hansen and Aksel Zachariassen. From 1924 to 1925 he edited the communist magazine Proletaren. He was fired for opposing a semi-union with the Labour Party (some two months after the editor of Arbeidet was fired for supporting such a union). He was also imprisoned for 120 days for antimilitaristic agitation. He also translated French poetry and published I det grønne bur and the novel Det røde slips in 1926.

== Shift to the far right ==
Olaussen had already undergone change from antimilitarism to favoring a violent revolution, when he in 1927 shifted from the extreme left to the far right. He left the Communist Party in 1927, but unlike many others who then joined the Labour Party, he joined the right-wing Fatherland League in 1928 and later the Conservative Party. From 1927 he wrote for the newspaper Tidens Tegn. During the occupation of Norway by Nazi Germany he was refused membership in the fascist party Nasjonal Samling. Nonetheless, he wrote extensively for the Nazi publications of the party.

== Post-war ==
Olaussen wrote the memoirs Fra Kreml til Youngstorget, "From Kremlin to Youngstorget". The memoirs were printed, but because of the war's end and him being considered Nazi collaborator, his kind was not longer tolerated and the book was not published. In 1947, Olaussen, during the legal purge in Norway after World War II, was sentenced for Nazi collaboration to two and a half-years in prison. He died in January 1962.
