= Berit Nøkleby =

Norwegian historian (1939–2018)

- Born: 25 September 1939; Drammen, Norway
- Died: 26 July 2018 (aged 78)
- Occupation: Historian

Berit Nøkleby (25 September 1939 – 26 July 2018) was a Norwegian historian.

She was born in Drammen, and was educated as a cand.philol. She contributed to several books on the German occupation of Norway. She wrote books II and IV of the series Norge i krig I–VIII. Fremmedåk og frihetskamp 1940–1945 (II: Nyordning, 1985, and IV: Holdningskamp, 1986). She wrote the book Josef Terboven. Hitlers mann i Norge (1992), and she was co-editor of the encyclopaedia Norsk Krigsleksikon 1940–1945 (1995).

She died at the age of 78.

== Selected works ==
- Nyordning (1985)
- Holdningskamp (1986)
- Pass godt på Tirpitz! : norske radioagenter i Secret Intelligence Service 1940-1945 (1988)
- Da krigen kom (1989)
- Josef Terboven: Hitlers mann i Norge (1992)
- Skutt blir den-- : tysk bruk av dødsstraff i Norge 1940-1945 (1996)
- Barn under krigen (2000)
- Gestapo: tysk politi i Norge 1940–45 (2003)
- Krigsforbrytelser: brudd på krigens lov i Norge 1940–45 (2004)
- Politigeneral og hirdsjef Karl A. Marthinsen (2010)
