= Thorolf Vogt =

Norwegian geologist and Arctic explorer (1888–1958)

- Born: 7 June 1888; Vang, Norway
- Died: 8 December 1958 (aged 70)
- Education: University of Oslo
- Occupations: Geologist; Arctic explorer
- Employer(s): Norwegian Geological Survey; University of Oslo; Norwegian Institute of Technology
- Father: Johan Herman Lie Vogt
- Relatives: Fredrik Vogt (brother); Johan Vogt (brother); Jørgen Vogt (brother)

Thorolf Vogt (7 June 1888 – 8 December 1958) was a Norwegian geologist, professor and Arctic explorer.

== Biography ==
He was born in Vang Municipality in Hedmark, Norway. He was the son of Johan Herman Lie Vogt (1858–1932) and Martha Johanne Abigael Kinck. His elder brother Fredrik Vogt (1892–1970) was director general of the Norwegian Water Resources and Energy Agency, His younger twin brothers were Johan Vogt (1900–91), a social economist and professor at the University of Oslo and Jørgen Vogt (1900–72) newspaper editor and member of the Norwegian Parliament.

He studied at the Royal Frederik University (now University of Oslo) and completed his examen artium in 1906. He subsequently went on trips to universities in both Vienna and Göttingen. In 1909, he got a job as an assistant at the Norwegian Geological Survey where from 1914 to 1929 he held the position of state geologist. From 1915 to 1923 he was research associate at the University of Oslo. In 1928, he defended his doctorate dissertation Sulitjelmafeltets geologi og petrografi. He was appointed professor of mineralogy and geology at the Norwegian Institute of Technology from 1929. He was in charge of scientific expeditions to Svalbard (1925, 1928) and to Greenland (1931).

Thorolf Vogt was also elected to the Norwegian Academy of Sciences in 1929. In 1936 he was elected to the Royal Norwegian Society of Sciences and Letters. He was also award the Order of St. Olav. In 1950 he became a foreign member of the Geological Society of London.
