= Aksel Zachariassen =

Norwegian politician (1898–1987)

Aksel "Azach" Zachariassen
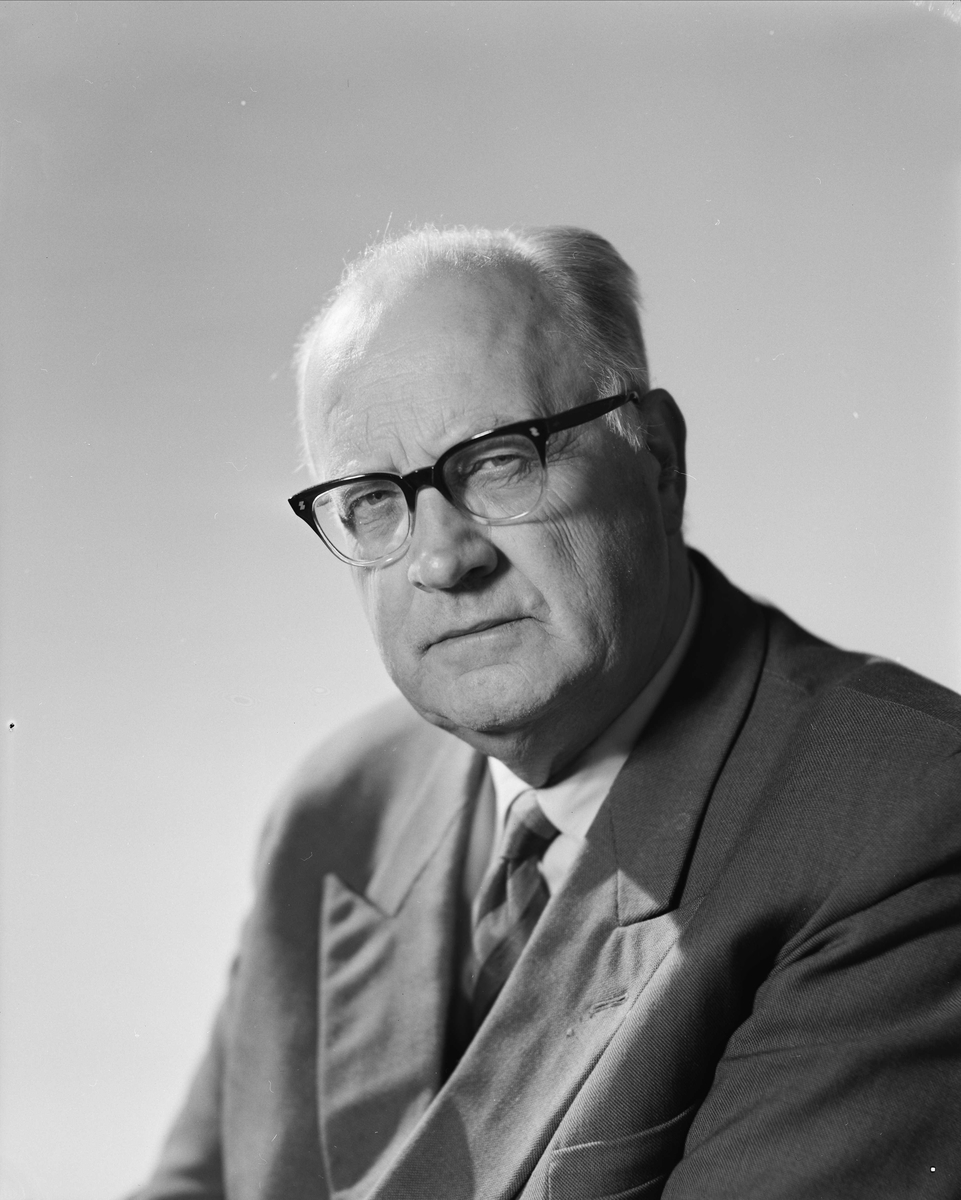
- Aksel Zachariassen in 1962
- Born: 16 November 1898; Porsgrunn
- Died: 6 August 1987 (aged 88); Oslo

Aksel "Azach" Zachariassen (16 November 1898 – 6 August 1987) was a Norwegian politician, newspaper editor, secretary and writer.

== Biography ==
He was born in Porsgrunn as a son of ship captain Aksel Zachariassen (1853–1927) from Luleå and Karen Nilsen (1860–1933) from Ulefoss. He began his journalistic career in Bratsberg-Demokraten. In 1920 he was hired in the Det socialdemokratiske Pressekontor (where he met his wife), he went on to Arbeiderbladet in 1923, Halden Arbeiderblad in 1928, Arbeidermagasinet in 1931 and Kongsvinger Arbeiderblad in 1932. In the latter newspaper he was the editor-in-chief. He was also involved in revolutionary politics, and headed the Young Communist League of Norway from 1921 to 1923, while the organization was still affiliated with the Norwegian Labour Party. Also, he was subject to deportation from the United Kingdom during a visit there in 1919, where he among others tried to rally support for the Red Guards of Finland, and met with Sylvia Pankhurst. Zachariassen participated in the Left Communist Youth League's military strike action of 1924. He was convicted for assisting in this crime and sentenced to 90 days of prison.

Because of his background he was fired as chief editor in 1941, when the newspapers in Norway were usurped by the Nazi authorities, installed when Germany invaded Norway in 1940. He was even arrested, in June 1941. He was imprisoned at Møllergata 19 from August 1941 to October 1941, then at Grini concentration camp until May 1942, then at Sachsenhausen concentration camp until the war's end. At Sachsenhausen he worked within the parcels section (German: Paketenstelle). He was the first to get in contact with Wanda Hjort, when she started visiting the camp in 1943. This contact came to be an important communication channel between the camp and the people at Gross Kreutz, who later became an important source of information to the Swedish Red Cross, and to the International Red Cross in Geneva. After the war he was hired in A-pressens felles Oslo-redaksjon in 1946 and Arbeidernes Pressekontor in 1947. He was the chief secretary in Arbeidernes Opplysningsforbund from 1950 to 1962, except for the time from 1953 to 1954 when he was an attaché at the Norwegian embassy in London.

Zachariassen also wrote many books. The two main categories of books were history books of trade unions, as well as biographies of people in the labour movement. He is also known for the propagandistic history book Den røde ungdom i kamp og seier. Norges kommunistiske ungdomsforbund gjennem 20 aar which he wrote together with Arvid G. Hansen and Eugène Olaussen. He published his memoirs in 1978. He died in August 1987 in Oslo.
