= Transiteatret-Bergen =

Norwegian theatre company

Coordinates: 60°23′43″N 5°18′55″E

Transiteatret-Bergen (Tt-B) is a theatre company based in Bergen, Norway.

Transiteatret-Bergen (Tt-B) constitutes a dynamic network of artists working in different constellations transgressing geographic and artistic dividing lines. Tt-B has its base in Bergen (Norway), but collaborates with national and international institutions and professionals in the development of a contemporary and critical experimental theatre, with a core interest in the musical and political-aesthetical potential of the theatre. Artistic director of Transiteatret-Bergen is Tore Vagn Lid.

The company has developed a number of critically acclaimed works which has been presented on contemporary venues and festivals both nationally and internationally like Salzburger Festspielen (YDP, "Die Massnahme", 2008) and Bergen International Festival and Arctic Arts Festival. Transiteatret-Bergen is supported by The City of Bergen and Norwegian Arts Council.Transiteatret-Bergen is supported by The City of Bergen and Norwegian Arts Council. .

== Awards ==
Hedda Award (category "Project of the year") - 2008 "Mann=Mann", a cooperation between Transiteatret-Bergen and Rogaland Teater.[1] 2020 Hedda Award: "Exceptional Artistic Achievement" (03:08:38 Tilstander av Unntak) 2020 Hedda Award: "Best Audio Visual Design" (03:08:38 Tilstander av Unntak)

== Productions ==
Productions include:

Triggersystemet 1 - (Transiteatret-Bergen) - 2024 Kunsten å lage en felle (Transiteatret-Bergen) - 2022 "03:08:38 Tilstander av Unntak" (Transiteatret-Bergen) / Eng. title: "03:08:38 States of Emergency) -2020 Highway Hypnosis (Transiteatret-Bergen) -2017 DUB-Leviathan (Transiteatret-Bergen) -2015 Judasevangeliet – (sosiologisk) Sørgespill by T.V.Lid(Transiteatret-Bergen/ Ultima /DNO 2013) Fatzer by Bertolt Brecht, (Re)construction by Tore Vagn Lid (Tt-B, Nationaltheatret, Bergen Int. Festival - 2012) Sound of Science - a Stage Seminar by T.V.Lid(site specific -Transiteatret-Bergen) 2011 /2012) Ressentiment- Pavane til en død prinsesse by T.V.Lid (Transiteatret-Bergen-2010) Ut, ut i det grønne! by T.V.Lid (Tt-B -2010) Polyfonia-Variasjoner by T.V.Lid (Tt-B -2010) Elephant Stories - E. Jelinek, Ùber Tiere / T.V. Lid, "Passacaglia" - (Tt-B, Nationaltheatret, Bergen Festival - 2009) Mann = Mann by Bertolt Brecht (Tt-B / Rogaland Teater - 2008) Die Massnahme (Tt-B / Bergen int. Festival / Salzburg Festival (YDP)2007/2008) Polyfonia (Tt-B, Teater Ibsen, Kulturskatten - 2007) To be continued ... (Tt-B/DNS - 2005/06) -Esse est percipi (2006) -The Great Pop Ambient Pub Quiz Show (2005) -Expanding the Battlezone- audio visual dialogues with Michel Houellebecq (2005) Maybe it's Too Nice (Transiteatret-Bergen -2004) Trio for to skuespillere og spansk gitar (2003/04) Walk Cat, Walk! (2002-2004) (Transiteatret-Bergen, 2002) Opus 1 - Maktens Anatomi (Transiteatret-Bergen, 2000/03)
