= Johanna Bugge Olsen =

Norwegian writer, newspaper editor and politician

Johanna Bugge Olsen (10 May 1900 – 16 August 1973) was a Norwegian writer, newspaper editor and politician for the Labour and the Communist parties.

== Biography ==
Johanna Bugge Olsen finished her secondary education in 1919, and then started working in the Labour Party press. In 1923 she joined the newly formed Communist Party. She was a member of Bergen city council, and stood on the ballot (third candidate) in Bergen for the 1933 and 1936 general elections. She became subeditor in one of the party's most important newspapers, Arbeidet, in 1931 and was the editor-in-chief from 1938 to 1940. Financially the newspaper did not fare well, partly because the Communist Party prioritized to prop up Arbeideren, and Arbeidet was not released between 14 December 1938 and 30 March 1939. On 9 August 1940 (still with Olsen as editor) it stopped entirely because of the occupation of Norway by Nazi Germany.

In 1949, during the legal purge in Norway after World War II, Olsen was convicted of treason for having printed "un-national" material in six articles in May and June 1940 prior to the closing of Arbeidet. She started writing books, and first authored four books mostly about local trade unions: Femti år på sporet : Bergens sporvei 1897–1947, Sporveisreparatørenes forening, Bergen 30 år, Malersvennenes forening, Bergen 65 år 1884–1949 and Malersvennenes forening: 75 års beretning 1884–1959. She then wrote novels and young adult fiction, including Tine (1961, translated to Russian in 1963 and German in 1967), Løsgjengeren (1963, translated to English as Stray Dog in 1966), Den hvite wampumen (1967), Præriekyllingen danser (1968) and Vesle-kari blir voksen (1969, translated to Icelandic in 1973).

She was married to Alf Pettersen (1899–1977), mayor in Laksevåg.
