= Peter Egge =

Norwegian author, journalist and playwright

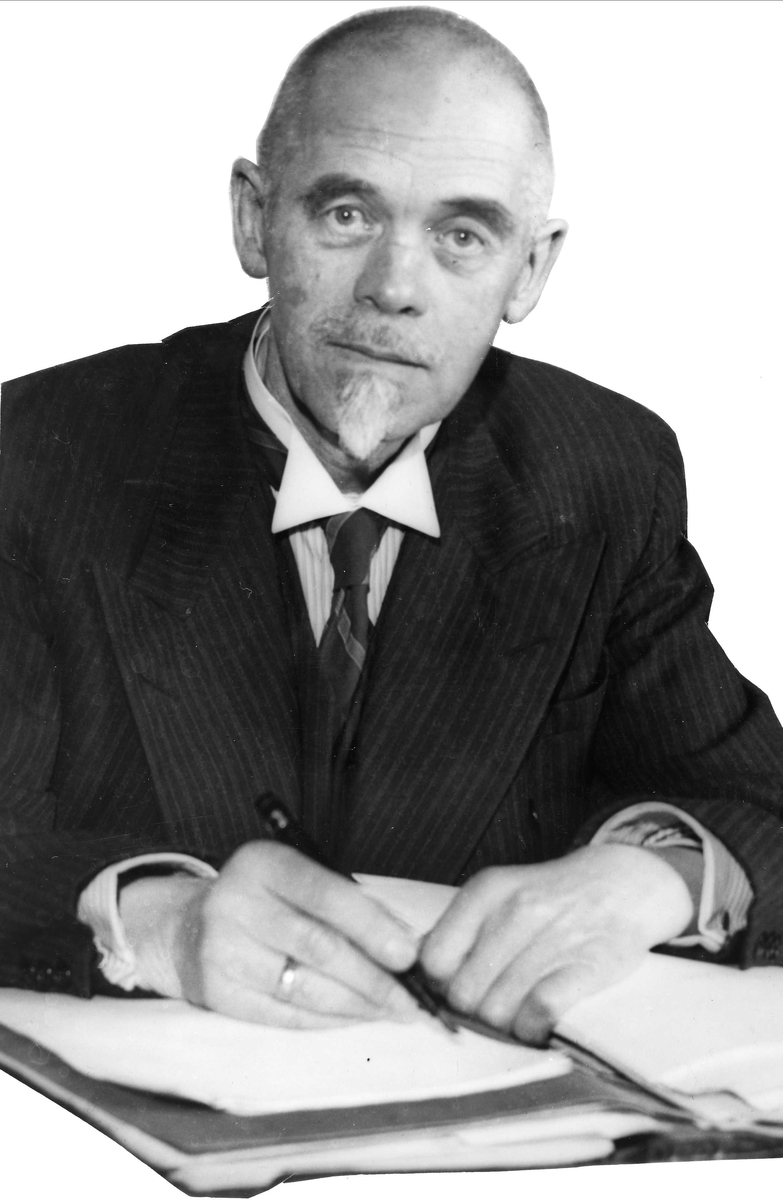
- Peter Egge in 1935
- Born: 1 April 1869; Trondheim, Norway
- Died: 15 July 1959 (aged 90); Oslo, Norway
- Spouse: Anne-Marie Svensen (1897–1959; his death)
- Children: Ørnulf Egge; Asta Egge; Randi Egge
- Writing career
- Period: 1891–1955
- Genres: Novel; Comedy; Romance

Peter Egge (1 April 1869 – 15 July 1959) was a renowned Norwegian author, journalist and playwright. His writing career extended from 1891 until 1955.

== Early life ==
Peter Egge was born in Trondheim, Norway. He was the second eldest in a family of nine children born to a couple from Nord-Trøndelag. Summer holidays were often spent with relatives in the rural countryside. His writings would later commonly focus on Trondheim, and feature the rural customs of the traditional district of Innherred where he spent his childhood and adolescence.

== Career ==
Egge attended the Trondheim Cathedral School, from which he graduated in 1887. Egge made his literary debut with the novel Almue (1891). He later started his job as a journalist with the Trondheim-based newspaper Dagsposten. In the following years he divided his time between journalism and authorship. He frequently wrote comedies, a genre in which he enjoyed success. This venture in comedy started with Faddergaven (The Christening Gift, 1897) and included several other works. Egge also wrote serious plays. His Kjærlighed og Venskab (Love and Friendships, 1904) is a fine example of his serious-themed writing. Egge continued this swaying both toward comedy and serious plays throughout his career. Some of the best works of this period of his career were Jomfru Nelly Maartens (Miss Nelly Maartens, 1897), Gammelholm (1899), and Hjertet (The Heart, 1907).

Beginning in the early 1920s, Egge began to depart from the image of a writer of comedies and romantic tales. The Holy Sea, which was published in 1922, marked his metamorphosis from a somewhat romantic writer into a neo-realistic one. His style became heavily descriptive. It was this shift in style that gradually led to Hansine Solstad (1925), which is regarded as his best work.

He served as chairman of the Norwegian Authors' Union (Den Norske Forfatterforening) from 1913 to 1916 and 1935 and was chairman of the literary advice committee in 1920 and 1929.

== Personal life ==
In 1897, he married Anna Marie Svensen and settled in Christiania, now Oslo. He was the father of Norwegian politician and resistance member Ørnulf Egge.

== Bibliography ==
- Almue (1891)
- Nordfra (1895)
- Faddergaven (1897)
- Trøndere (1898)
- Gammelholm (1899)
- Jakob og Kristoffer (1900)
- Sønnen (1901)
- Mainætter (1902)
- Familien paa Raaum (1903)
- De graa Haar (1904)
- Kjærlighed og Venskab (1904)
- Oddvar Hage og hans Venner (1905)
- En liten gutt (1906)
- Hjertet (1907)
- Lenken (1908)
- Pastor Hals (1909
- De unge dage (1913)
- Narren (1917)
- Den hellige sjø (1922)
- Jægtvig og hans gud (1923)
- Hansine Solstad (1925)
- Hos Vincent Øst (1926)
- Drømmen (1927)
- Han og hans døtre (1928)
- Indian Summer (1929)
- Woel, Cai M. (1929)
- Minner fra barndom og ungdom (1948)

== Awards ==
- Gyldendal's Endowment for 1935
