= Olga Andersen =

Norwegian politician

Olga Andersen (1886 — 1939) was a Norwegian politician for the Communist Party.

She began her working career as a maid, and later underwent tailor training. She joined the Communist Party in 1923, and became the secretary of women's affairs in 1928, after Jeanette Olsen. Furthermore, she was also a delegate at the Sixth Comintern Congress in 1928. She stood for election in Akershus in 1927 and 1933, as third and tenth candidate on the ballot, respectively. She was also active in cooperativism.
