= Fredrik Vogt =

Norwegian engineer (1892–1970)

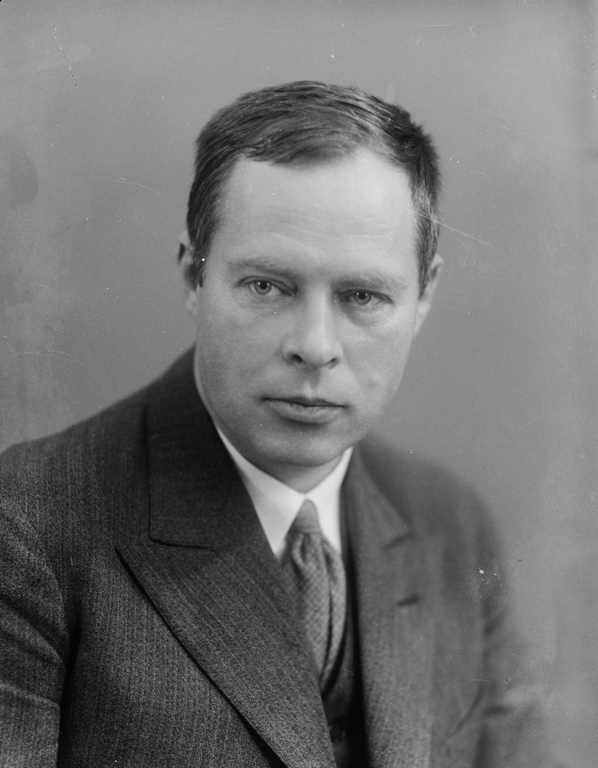
Fredrik Vogt in 1934

Fredrik Vogt (23 December 1892 – 26 January 1970) was a Norwegian engineer and civil servant. In the 1930s he was a professor and rector at the Norwegian Institute of Technology (Norwegian abbreviation NTH). As the first director general of the Norwegian Water Resources and Energy Agency, he played a central role in developing the hydroelectric power capacity in Norway after the Second World War.

== Personal life ==
Vogt was born in Kristiania; a son of professor of metallurgy and geology Johan Herman Lie Vogt and Martha Johanne Abigael Kinck. He was a brother of geologist Thorolf Vogt, economist Johan Vogt and newspaper editor and politician Jørgen Vogt. In 1916 he married Signe Fjalstad, a sister of jurist and politician Olaf Fjalstad. He was a brother-in-law of actor Martin Linge and physician Odd Havrevold, who both were married to his sister Margit. He died in Oslo in January 1970.

== Career ==
=== Early career ===
Vogt graduated as construction engineer from the Norwegian Institute of Technology in 1914, and as dr. techn. in 1924. His thesis, Berechnung und Konstruktion des Wasserschlosses, was published in Germany. He was the first doctorate from the NTH. From 1914 to 1918 he worked as engineer for Kincks Vandbygningskontor. From 1918 to 1922 he constructed the Skarfjord hydroelectric plant in Northern Norway. He was appointed at the Norwegian Institute of Technology from 1922, as professor in mechanics from 1931. He published nearly fifty scientific papers in various journals. In 1936 he was elected rector of the institute.

=== Second World War ===
As rector during the German invasion of Norway, and the subsequent occupation, Vogt faced various challenges. He was re-elected as rector in May 1940, but resigned from his position in September 1941, and moved to Oslo. In January 1943 he skied to Sweden, and was immediately brought to England. In London he worked for the Norwegian government in exile. From the summer of 1943 he chaired a governmental industrial committee.

=== Post war ===
Vogt resumed his position as rector at NTH from May 1945. He served as director general of the Norwegian Water Resources and Energy Agency from 1947 to 1960. During this period the Norwegian Government completed several large hydroelectric power plants, increasing the state-owned total annual production capacity from about two to nearly eight TWh. Internationally, he chaired the Organisation for European Economic Co-operation Electricity Committee from 1954 to 1957, and was member of a World Bank committee for supervising power stations funded by the bank.

== Awards and decorations ==
Vogt became a member of the Norwegian Academy of Science and Letters in 1936. He was decorated as a Commander of the Order of St. Olav in 1947, and was Commander of the Order of the Polar Star.
