= Johan Herman Lie Vogt =

Norwegian geologist (1858–1932)

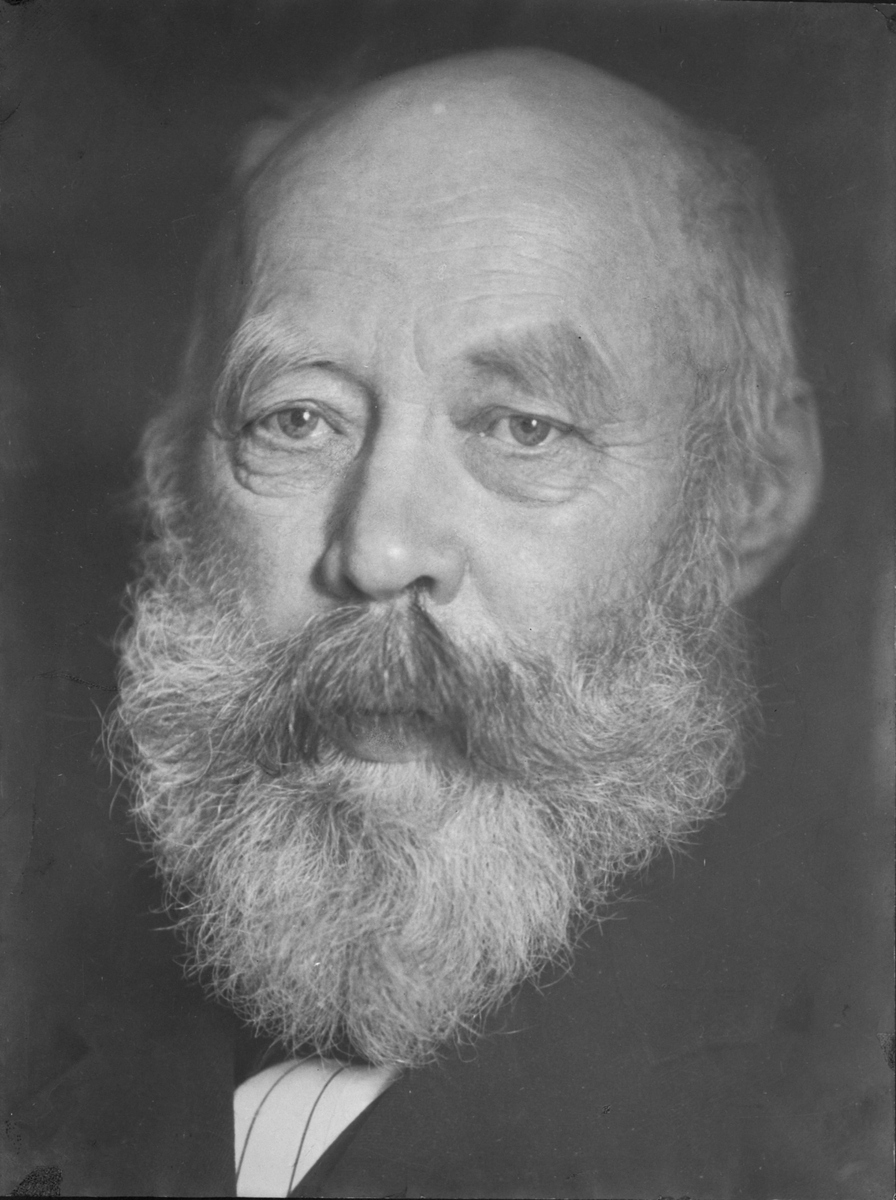
- Born: 14 October 1858; Tvedestrand, Norway
- Died: 3 January 1932 (aged 73); Trondheim, Norway
- Education: University of Oslo
- Occupation: Geologist
- Organization: Norwegian Institute of Technology
- Children: Fredrik Vogt; Thorolf Vogt; Johan Vogt; Jørgen Vogt
- Relatives: Sophus Lie
- Awards: Wollaston Medal (1932)

Johan Herman Lie Vogt (14 October 1858 – 3 January 1932) was a Norwegian geologist and petrologist. Vogt was a professor at the University of Oslo and at the Norwegian Institute of Technology.

== Biography ==
Vogt was born in Tvedestrand, Norway. He was a son of physician Olaus Fredrik Sand Vogt and Mathilde Eliza Lie. He was the nephew of mathematician Sophus Lie (1842–1899). Psychiatrist Ragnar Vogt (1870–1943) was a younger brother. Vogt studied at the Technical Institute in Dresden and in 1880 graduated from the University of Christiania (now University of Oslo). Vogt was cand.min. from 1880.

== Career ==
Vogt was appointed professor in metallurgy at the University of Christiania from 1886 to 1912. When the Norwegian Institute of Technology in Trondheim was established. Vogt became the college's first professor of geology and held the position 1912–28. Vogt was responsible for developing the institute's department of geology. He was succeeded by his son Thorolf Vogt. Johan Vogt was awarded the Wollaston Medal by the Geological Society of London in 1932.

== Selected works ==
- Norsk marmor – 1895
- Die Silikatschmelzlösungen – 1903
- De gamle norske jernverk – 1908
- Norges jernmalmforekomster – 1910

== Personal life ==
He married Martha Johanne Abigael Kinck in 1887. He was the father of engineer Fredrik Vogt (1892–1970), geologist Thorolf Vogt (1888–1958), social economist Johan Vogt (1900–1991) and newspaper editor Jørgen Vogt (1900–1972).
