= Arbeideren =

Norwegian newspaper

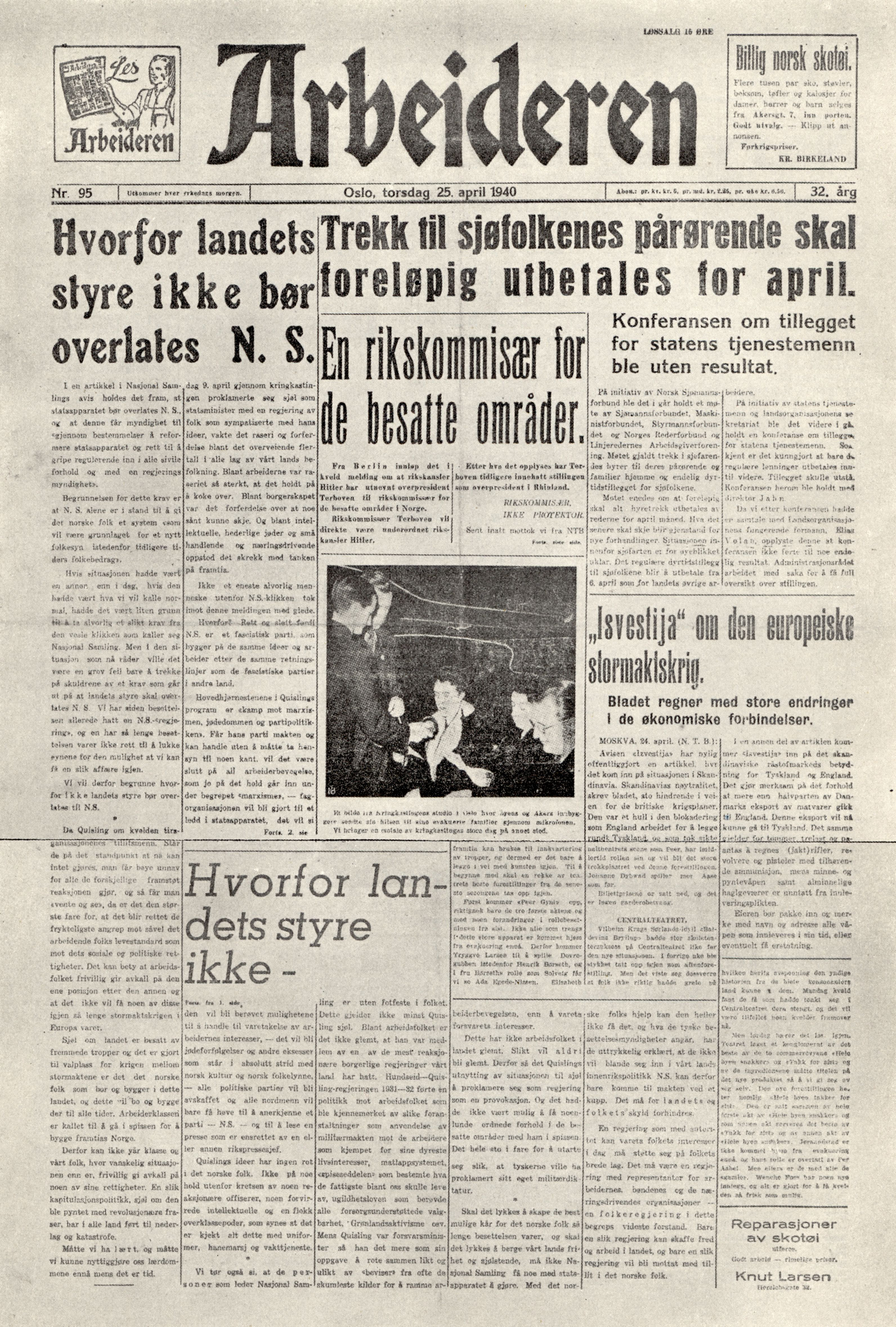
A Arbeideren newspaper

Arbeideren ("The Worker") was a daily newspaper published in Oslo, Norway.

It was started on 2 November 1929 as the official party newspaper from the Communist Party. It lent its name from a Hamar-based newspaper of the same name, which had gone defunct on 4 October. More directly, it replaced Norges Kommunistblad which just had gone bankrupt. Its first editor was Arvid G. Hansen, who had been the last editor of Norges Kommunistblad. He remained in the chair until 1931.

Reinert Torgeirson was editor from 1931 to 1932, followed by Erling Bentzen. In 1934 he was fired for not following the directions of the Comintern, the superior organ of the Communist Party of Norway. Henry W. Kristiansen became the new editor-in-chief, having been deposed as party leader. The publication was irregular, sometimes it came daily, sometimes weekly. From 1937 it was a daily newspaper, supported by the party while it siphoned support from other party newspapers, such as Arbeidet.

Henry W. Kristiansen still sat as editor on 9 April 1940, when World War II reached Norway with the German invasion. The newspaper became controversial among many. First, because it strongly criticized the existing Norwegian Fascist party Nasjonal Samling as well as Fascism in general. For this it was confiscated on 25 April. Second, because it criticized the actions of the legal government, Nygaardsvold's Cabinet, and its alliance with Great Britain. The newspaper was edited out of "neutrality" concerns; this was because of the Molotov–Ribbentrop Pact. As the invading Germans tightened their rule of Norway, Arbeideren was forbidden and stopped on 16 August 1940. Kristiansen died in Neuengamme concentration camp in 1942.

After the war, Arbeideren never returned, and Friheten became the official party organ. Arbeideren was probed into during the legal purge in Norway after World War II for its criticism towards the legal government in 1940, but the case was closed since Kristiansen, and former board member of the newspaper Ottar Lie, were dead.
