= Tore Vagn Lid =

Tore Vagn Lid (born 25 April 1973, in Bergen) is a Norwegian theatre director, playwright, musician, academic researcher and artistic director of Transiteatret-Bergen . Tore Vagn Lid holds a professorship in Norwegian University of Science and Technology (Dramaturgy at Department of Art and Media Studies). and was professor in Directing and Dramaturgy at Oslo National Academy of the Arts (2012-2021). In 2018 Tore Vagn Lid was a guest professor in Dramaturgy at the Institute of Theatre- Film- and Media Science at Goethe University Frankfurt He earned a PhD from the Institute for Applied Theatre Studies in Giessen, Germany (Summa cum laude). Central in what is seen as a new political turn in the contemporary Norwegian theater. He has also written numerous articles, especially focusing on the relationship between theater and music, music dramaturgy, directing and artistic research.

== Artistic work / research ==
In 2008 Lid was selected to the program "Young directors project" for the Salzburg Festival with his staging of Brecht/Eislers play The Measures Taken (in German: Die Maßnahme). The theater suite Elephant Stories (2009) was an audio-visual confrontation between the theater room and a "new naturalism" represented by the new neuro-sciences. Following up this critical discussion, he used Gerhart Hauptmanns naturalistic piece (1889) Before Sunrise (Vor Sonnenaufgang) as a prism towards an upcoming new naturalism . Under the motto "Theatre in times of crisis" Lid (re)constructed Brechts "Fatzer" for the Bergen International Festival 2012 recognized in both Norwegian and German press . During 2012 - 2013 Vagn Lid has developed a trilogy called "Games of sorrow" (Norwegian: Sørgespill-triologien). In his music-dramaturgical conception, Lid searches for, and tries to articulate ... "the individuals inside the systems and, the other way around, the systems inside the individuals". The concept attempts "to overcome the gap between the typical individualization of the "classical" theatre on the one hand, and the statistical abstractions of the "documentary" theatre, on the other". The first of Vagn Lids Games of Sorrow was STRAFF (Punishment), performed for the first time at Logen Teater in Bergen, September dato 2012. The second one was "KILL THEM ALL!" written for, and performed at Nationaltheatret in Oslo, February 2013, both receiving outstanding reviews, and released discussions also outside Norway. The last part of the trilogy is "JudasEvangeliet",(The Gospel of Judas) developed with Transiteatret-Bergen for The Ultima Contemporary Music Festival in Oslo with premiere at the Opera September 11, 2013

== Awards ==
- Hedda Award (category "Project of the year") in 2008 for his direction of the play Mann=Mann, a cooperation between Transiteatret-Bergen and Rogaland Teater.
- 2009 Hedda Award -"Event of the year" of the play Operasjon Almenrauschr , based on the World War II Operation Almenrausch, produced Agder Teater and Vest-Agder Fylkeskommune in October 2008.
- In 2012 Tore Vagn Lid received both Nordic Radio Play-award and the NRK Bluebird (Blå Fugl) award "Blå Fugl" for his radio-play "Almenrausch - en radiohøring" produced and sent by NRK Radioteatret (2011). The radio play was also promoted as Norwegian contribution for the European Theatre Today 2012 edition.
- Bergen kommunes kunstnerpris 2012
- In 2013 Tore Vagn Lid receives The Norwegian Theatere Critics Award 2012/2013 for his game of sorrow#2, KILL THEM ALL! which made with the National Theatre ( Nationaltheatret)The Norwegian Theatre Critics Award (Den norske Teaterkritikerprisen or Kritikerprisen) is awarded by the Norwegian Critics' Association (Norsk Kritikerlag) and has been awarded every year since 1939 (except 1940-45).
- 2016 - Hedda Award: "Best director" "Vår Ære/vår Makt"
- 2016 - Hedda Award: "Best drama" "Vår Ære/vår Makt" (together with Cecilie Løveid)
- The National Ibsen Award 2017 for "Vår Ære/Vår Makt" (Bergen) 2016.
- 2020 Hedda Award: "Exceptional Artistic Achievement" (03:08:38 Tilstander av Unntak)
- 2020 Hedda Award: "Best Audio Visual Design" (03:08:38 Tilstander av Unntak)

== Worklist ==
- Triggersystemet 1 - (Transiteatret-Bergen) - 2024
- 1984? (Den Nationale Scene) - 2023
- Kunsten å lage en felle (Transiteatret-Bergen) - 2022
- Tolvskillingsoperaen (Det Norske Teatret) - 2021
- "03:08:38 Tilstander av Unntak" (Transiteatret-Bergen) / Eng. title: "03:08:38 States of Emergency) -2020
- Peer Gynt DUB (Den Nationale Scene) - 2019
- Underkastelser (Teater Ibsen) - 2018
- Highway Hypnosis (Transiteatret-Bergen) -2017
- Fyrsten -Machiavelliversjonar (Nationaltheatret) - 2017
- Vår Ære/Vår Makt (Den Nationale Scene)- 2016/2017
- Fridomens Vegar (Det Norske Teateret) -2016
- DUB-Leviathan (Transiteatret-Bergen) -2015
- Judasevangeliet – (sosiologisk) Sørgespill by T.V.Lid(Transiteatret-Bergen/ Ultima /DNO 2013)
- Kill Them All! (Sosiologisk) sørgespill by T.V.Lid(Nationaltheatret 2013)
- Straff- (sosiologisk) sørgespel by T.V.Lid(Hordaland Teater)
- Fatzer by Bertolt Brecht, (Re)construction by Tore Vagn Lid (Tt-B, Nationaltheatret, Bergen Int. Festival - 2012)
- Sound of Science - a Stage Seminar by T.V.Lid(site specific -Transiteatret-Bergen) 2011 /2012)
- Før Soloppgang –(G. Haubtmann), Den Nationale Scene (2011)
- Enron by Lucy Preble (Teateret Vårt i Molde/ Rogaland Teater, 2011)
- Ressentiment- Pavane til en død prinsesse by T.V.Lid (Transiteatret-Bergen-2010)
- Ut, ut i det grønne! by T.V.Lid (Tt-B -2010)
- Polyfonia-Variasjoner by T.V.Lid (Tt-B -2010)
- Elephant Stories - E. Jelinek, Ùber Tiere / T.V. Lid, "Passacaglia" - (Tt-B, Nationaltheatret, Bergen Festival - 2009)
- Embargo (Hordaland Teater, 2008)
- Operasjon Almenrausch by T.V.Lid (Vest-Ageder Fylke/ Agder Teater - 2008)
- Mann = Mann by Bertolt Brecht (Tt-B / Rogaland Teater - 2008)
- Die Massnahme (Tt-B / Bergen int. Festival / Salzburg Festival (YDP)2007/2008)
- Polyfonia (Tt-B, Teater Ibsen, Kulturskatten - 2007)
- Karierekonstruktivisme by Julian Von Gärtner Blaue
- To be continued ... (Tt-B/DNS - 2005/06)
- -Esse est percipi (2006)
- -The Great Pop Ambient Pub Quiz Show (2005)
- -Expanding the Battlezone- audio visual dialogues with Michel Houellebecq (2005)
- Maybe it's Too Nice (Transiteatret-Bergen -2004)
- Trio for to skuespillere og spansk gitar (2003/04)
- Walk Cat, Walk! (2002-2004) (Transiteatret-Bergen, 2002)
- Opus 1 - Maktens Anatomi (Transiteatret-Bergen, 2000/03)

== Books ==
- Reflekxive Dramaturgy (Cappelen Damm Akademisk) - 2019
- Gegenseitige Verfremdungen - Theater als kritischer Erfahrungsraum im Stoffwechsel zwischen Bühne und Musik (Peter Lang Verlag, 2011)
- Estetisk Safari (Ed.)[Filosofiske tekster nr 22] Filosofisk institutt, Bergen 2003)

-Translations/Reconstructions-

- Fatzer, Bertolt Brecht (2012, Spartacus Forlag)
- Avgjørelsen, Bertolt Brecht (2012, Spartacus Forlag)
