= Peder Furubotn =

Norwegian cabinetmaker, politician and resistance member

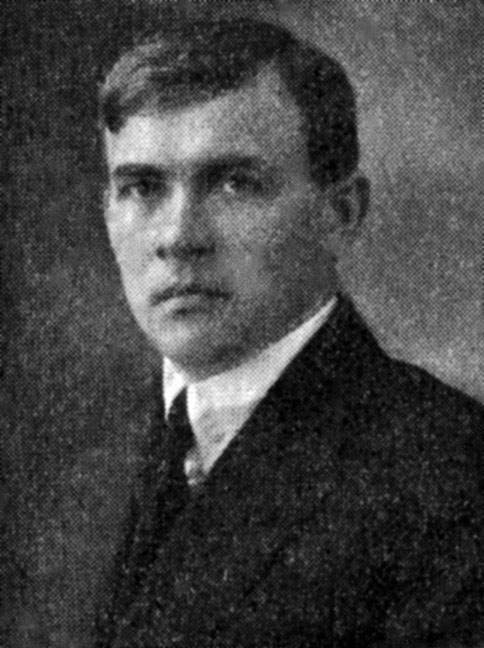

Personal details
- Born: 29 August 1890 Lavik og Brekke Municipality, Norway
- Died: 28 November 1975 (aged 85) Oslo, Norway
- Party: Communist Party of Norway (1923-1949)
- Other political affiliations: Labour Party
- Spouse: Gina Dorthea Sandal
- Education: Communist University of the National Minorities of the West
- Occupation: Cabinetmaker, and politician

Peder Furubotn (29 August 1890 – 28 November 1975) was a Norwegian cabinetmaker, politician for the Communist Party and resistance member during World War II.

== Early and personal life ==
Furubotn was born near Brekke in Lavik og Brekke Municipality in Nordre Bergenhus county, Norway. He was the son of Jørgen Furubotn and Valgjerd Miljeteig. He married Gina Dorthea Sandal in 1912. He started working as a cabinetmaker in Bergen when he was 14 years old. He joined the local union in 1909, and was a board member of the Bergen chapter for several years. He was also a board member of the Labour Party in Bergen. He was a board member of the radical union branch Fagopposisjonen av 1911, which had been founded by Martin Tranmæl.

== 1923–1940 ==
He was elected general secretary for the Communist Party of Norway (Norges Kommunistiske Parti, NKP) from its foundation in 1923, and was chairman of the party from 1925 to 1930. During this period he was among the loyal Moscow supporters and criticized people who diverged from the "correct" political line, as well as the Labour Party. Furubotn stayed in Moscow from 1930 to 1938, when he returned to Norway. He was also deputy chairman of the Communist Party of Norway after the Finnish War in 1946.

== World War II ==
Furubotn was arrested in August 1940, but released after interrogation. He immediately went undercover. He was elected secretary general of the NKP in 1941, after the arrest of de facto leader Henry Wilhelm Kristiansen following the German attack on the Soviet Union in June 1941.

He managed an undercover resistance organization in Norway during the five years of German occupation. From a centralized camp he activated resistance groups in different parts of the country. The camp developed sectors for economy, transport, distribution, newspapers, sabotage, intelligence and courier traffic, and organized farmers, women and youth. The camp was typically located in isolated mountain dairy farms, and could have a security zone with a 10-kilometre radius. External visits to the headquarters were only allowed during relocation periods. Frequent conferences were normally held at mountain huts or farms within a wider zone. Security personnel were located in the surrounding rural districts, and the camp received intelligence reports from observations of the Gestapo headquarters in Oslo and other cities.

The Germans made several efforts at catching Furubotn and his communist resistance organization. During the German Operation Almenrausch in June 1944 he successfully made a close escape from a large number of German troops, together with his family and central political activists, including Ørnulf Egge, Roald Halvorsen, Samuel Titlestad and Arne Taraldsen. Several other members of the organization were arrested in the operation.

Titlestad was chief of security for Furubotn, and he has been credited for developing security arrangements including the hiding out in huts in Øystre Slidre Municipality.

== Post-war period ==
Furubotn had a central role within the Communist Party until 1947, when he retired from his position as secretary general. In 1949 he was expelled from the NKP as a "Titoist" following internal controversies and interference from Moscow. Furubotn and his supporters were accused of being titoists and nationalists. Furubotn continued with political activities, but was isolated from party politics during the Cold War period. Among his post-war publications are Kampen for Norges suverenitet from 1948, Vi må våkne from 1951, Alt for mennesket from 1963, Norge i automasjonsalderen and Selvmordselementet i verdenspolitikken from 1969. His biography was written by historian Torgrim Titlestad.

Furubotn died in Oslo in 1975.

== Biographies ==
- Torgrim Titlestad: Peder Furubotn 1890 – 1938 (1975).
- Torgrim Titlestad: Stalin midt imot (1977)
- Torgrim Titlestad: I kamp, i krig (1977)

Party political offices
Preceded by Sverre Støstad	Chairman of the Communist Party of Norway; 1925–1930	Succeeded by Henry Wilhelm Kristiansen
