= Ørnulf Egge =

Norwegian politician (1910–1978)

Ørnulf Egge (26 May 1910 – 31 July 1978) was a Norwegian politician for the Workers' Youth League and Communist Party and resistance member during World War II.

== Early political career ==
He was born in Kristiania, and was a son of writer Peter Egge.

He became a central board member in the Workers' Youth League in 1934, and belonged to the left wing. This became clear especially after 1937, although Egge managed to win support for the Workers' Youth League to still work for disarmament. After the German invasion and occupation of Norway in 1940, Egge joined the Trade Opposition of 1940, a grouping that wanted non-resistance against the German invaders in order to secure good conditions for workers and trade unions. The Trade Opposition was declared underminers by the Norwegian Confederation of Trade Unions in July 1940, and in August/September when it became clear that the Fascist party Nasjonal Samling would be a cooperating partner with the Germans, Egge backed out together with Edvard Bull, Jr. and others. Shortly thereafter, the Workers' Youth League was prohibited by the Nazi authorities.

In 1941 Egge and others from the Workers' Youth League came into contact with the Communist Party, which had gone underground. In May 1942 Egge became the leader of the youth work in the Communist Party. In May 1943 he was sent to their secret headquarters encampment in Valdres, to work as organizational secretary. He was also a member of the central committee. On 13 June 1944 the headquarters were attacked by 800 Nazi personnel. What was called Operation Almenrausch was a blow to the Communist Party's organization, but Egge survived and fled. He operated out of Oslo until the end of World War II. At the same time the communist sabotages began to fade, because the movement lacked weapons and had been weakened by Operation Almenrausch and other arrests.

== Post-war career ==
On 15 June 1940, Egge gave his support to Johan Nygaardsvold to continue as Prime Minister of Norway. He also negotiated to cooperate more closely with the Labour Party; this goal was not achieved. Egge was the political secretary of the Communist Party from 1945 to 1946. He was excluded in 1950, during the purge against Peder Furubotn and his supporters. He died in 1978.
