= Benteng =

Benteng, the Indonesian word for fort, may refer to:

- Benteng people, the local Chinese Indonesian community of Tangerang City, Banten
- Benteng, Selayar Islands, the capital of Selayar Regency in South Sulawesi, Indonesia
- Benteng Reborn Stadium, a multi-purpose stadium in Tangerang, Indonesia
- Benteng railway station, a railway station in Surabaya, Indonesia

== See also ==
- FAW Besturn, also known as Benteng, a car series of First Automotive Works
- Benten
- Ben 10
