= Johan Vogt =

Norwegian economist (1900–1991)

- Born: 23 September 1900; Kristiania, Norway
- Died: 17 July 1991 (aged 90)
- Education: University of Oslo
- Occupation: social economist
- Father: Johan Herman Lie Vogt
- Relatives: Jørgen Vogt (brother)
- Awards: Fritt Ord Award (1976)

Johan Herman Vogt (23 September 1900 – 17 July 1991) was a Norwegian social economist, author and journal editor.

== Biography ==
Vogt was born in Kristiania (now Oslo), Norway. He was a son of Johan Herman Lie Vogt (1858–1932) and Martha Johanne Abigael Kinck (1861–1908). His father was a professor in geology at Norwegian Institute of Technology in Trondheim. His twin brother Jørgen Herman Vogt (1900–1972) was a newspaper editor and member of the Norwegian Parliament. His brother Fredrik Vogt (1892–1970) was an engineer and rector at the Norwegian Institute of Technology. His brother Thorolf Vogt (1888–1958) was a geologist and Arctic explorer.

He earned his Cand.oecon. from the University of Oslo in 1923. He was a member of Mot Dag from 1921, and chaired the Norwegian section of Clarté from 1927. During the Occupation of Norway by Nazi Germany, Vogt was arrested in 1941. He was sent to the Grini concentration camp from February 1945 until the liberation of Norway at the end of World War II.

He was a professor of social economics at the University of Oslo (UiO) from 1957 to 1970. From 1961 he was the head of the Demographic Institute at UiO. From 1950 to 1959 he served as vice-chairman and 1959-1963 chairman of the State Economic Association (Statsøkonomisk forening). He was editor of the journal Statsøkonomisk Tidsskrift from 1951 to 1959. He was also chairman of the Norwegian PEN Club from 1968 to 1981.

Vogt was a member of the Norwegian Academy of Sciences from 1959. In 1976, he was the first recipient of the Fritt Ord Award (Fritt Ords pris).

== Selected works ==
- Den marxistiske lære om varebytte og profitt (1931)
- Dogmenes sammenbrudd innenfor den socialøkonomiske vitenskap (1937)
- Lærebok i samfunnsøkonomi (1940)

Awards
Preceded by first recipient	Recipient of the Fritt Ord Award; 1976	Succeeded by Henrik Groth
