= Amund Nøkleby Bentzen =

Norwegian politician

Amund Nøkleby Bentzen (17 May 1903 – 19 May 1969) is a Norwegian priest and politician for the Christian Democratic Party.

He was a priest by profession, and thus stationed in different locations in Norway. During the occupation of Norway by Nazi Germany he led Milorg in Haltdalen Municipality (in the present-day Holtålen Municipality).

He served as a deputy representative to the Parliament of Norway from Sør-Trøndelag during the term 1945–1949. He met during 24 days of parliamentary session.
