= Bendiksen =

Bendiksen is a surname. Notable people with the surname include:

- Arne Bendiksen (1926–2009), Norwegian singer
- Thomas Kind Bendiksen (1989), Norwegian footballer
- Willy Bendiksen (1957), Norwegian drummer
- Jonas Bendiksen (born 1977), Norwegian photojournalist
- Rolf Bendiksen (born 1938), Norwegian politician
- Thomas Kind Bendiksen (born 1989), Norwegian footballer
