= Reinert Torgeirson =

Norwegian newspaper editor and politician

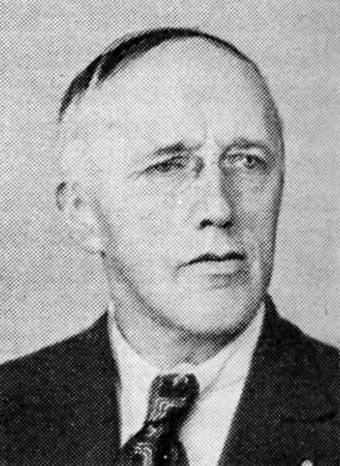
Reinert Torgeirson

Reinert Torgeirson (7 December 1884 – 30 November 1969) was a Norwegian newspaper editor and politician for the Labour and Communist parties. He was also an active poet, playwright and novelist.

== Biography ==
Torgeirson was born in Ålesund in Møre og Romsdal, Norway. He was a member of the temperance movement in his youth. He was a journalist in Ny Tid from 1910 to 1915, manager in Norges Socialdemokratiske Ungdomsforbund from 1915 to 1918, and director of the Labour Party publishing house Det Norske Arbeiderpartis Forlag from 1919 to 1923. For a period Torgeirson was the acting editor of Indtrøndelagens Socialdemokrat, from the arrest of editor Alfred Kruse to November 1914. A handbook in organizational work he wrote together with Arvid G. Hansen, Haandbog i lags- og studiearbeidet (1916) was the first handbook of its kind. He was also a deputy member of the Labour Party's national board from 1918.

In 1923, Torgeirson broke away from the Labour Party, joining the Communist Party. From 1924 to 1925, he edited Møre Arbeiderblad, and then Glomdalens Arbeiderblad in 1925 and Arbeidet from 1925 to 1929. From 1929 to 1930 he studied in the Soviet Union. From 1931 to 1932, Torgeirson edited Arbeideren. He then worked as a journalist in Arbeidermagasinet while working as a theatre critic for Arbeideren. He resigned his membership in the Communist Party in 1937.

Torgeirson was an active writer outside of the press. He published the poetry collections Under rødt flagg in 1915 and Digte in 1920. In 1919 and 1920, Torgeirson selected poems for a two-volume collection named Frihetsdigte. He later turned to writing plays, mainly meant to be staged by young laborers: Den store leveransen (1923), Per Brått (1931), Stener for brød (1932), ''Arbeidar og bonde (1934) and Jonsokfest (1938). Torgeirson also wrote novels, including Byen brenner! (1945). He also released two history books, Folketeaterforeningen gjennom 25 år (1954) and Norsk kafeforbund gjennom 30 år (1965).

Torgeirson died in 1969, and is buried on Østre gravlund.
