= Knut Olai Thornæs =

Norwegian newspaper editor and politician

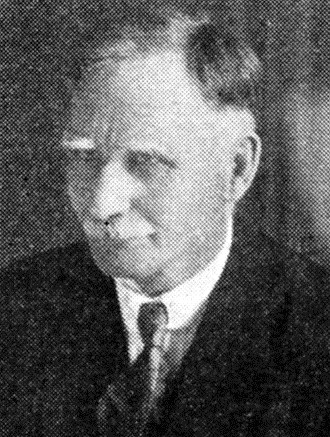
Knut Olai Thornæs

Knut Olai Thornæs (30 May 1874 – 1945) was a Norwegian newspaper editor and politician. He was a member of the Labour Party from 1900, and represented the party politically, but joined the Communist Party upon the split in 1923. Thornæs was the editor-in-chief of several newspapers, most notably Ny Tid.

== Career ==
Thornæs hailed from Kristiansund. Having first worked a few years as a manual laborer, in 1893 he completed his typographer's education, and moved to Trondhjem. He became involved in his local trade union, and in 1900 he joined the Norwegian Labour Party.

Thornæs published the temperance periodical Reform in 1901, but was soon hired as a journalist in Folketidende. In 1902, he was hired in the local Labour Party organ, Ny Tid. He worked here for many years, except for the period between 1906 and 1908, when he edited a Fredrikstad newspaper, Smaalenenes Social-Demokrat. Thornæs was elected to serve in Trondhjem city council in 1914, and was re-elected several times. In 1921, Thornæs took over as editor-in-chief of Ny Tid.

It was a turbulent time for the Labour Party, and in 1923 the party was nearing a split. In September 1923, Thornæs was excluded from the party for half a year for writing about Martin Tranmæl that he had either "lost his mind", or was a "provocateur" and "class traitor". The party then split over disagreements of its alignment to Comintern, and the wing that supported Comintern and the Twenty-one Conditions, broke away to form the Communist Party of Norway. Thornæs belonged to this wing, and as the communists usurped Ny Tid as their party organ, Thornæs could continue as editor-in-chief until 1934. He also represented the Communist Party in the city council. He ran twice for Parliament, in 1930 and 1933, but was not elected.

Thornæs also composed songs and poems, with overtones of class struggle. His most known song is Fram kamerater ('Forward, Comrades'), which was published for the first time in Ny Tid in 1911. Thornæs was also interested in church music and theater. He was a member and chairman of the board of Trondheim public library in the late 1930s.

== Legacy ==
In 1955, a sculpture commemorating Thornæs was erected at Møllenborg in Trondheim. The park in which the sculpture stands was named Thornæsparken. Also, a road in Trondheim has been named after him.

Thornæs' daughter Signe Kristine married twice, the last time to social democratic politician and newspaper editor Ole Øisang.
