= Arbeidet =

Norwegian newspaper

Logo.

Arbeidet ("The Work") was a Norwegian newspaper, published in Bergen in Hordaland county.

== History and profile ==
Arbeidet was started in Bergen as a socialist newspaper on 6 December 1893, by a grouping called De samvirkende Fag- og Arbeiderforeninger. It was the first socialist daily newspaper in Norway. The first editor was Johan Frogner; Henrik Martin Olofsson edited the newspaper around 1899, and noted editor Ivar Angell-Olsen assumed office in 1904. A former editor of Ny Tid, he introduced a degree of sensationalism in the newspaper and increased its circulation. In 1905, the newspaper got a formal tie to the Norwegian Labour Party in Bergen. Angell-Olsen remained editor until January 1914, when he left with immediate effect. The reason was "an internal party affair" in which Angell-Olsen did not want to "go into detail".

Arbeidet was edited by Olav Scheflo from 1914 to 1918, and Sverre Krogh from 1918. Other noted staff include Andreas Paulson, critic from 1895 to 1929, Otto Luihn, journalist from 1919 to 1923, and Alfred Madsen, subeditor from 1919 to 1920.

In 1923, the communists in the Labour Party broke away to form the Communist Party, and Arbeidet followed the new party. It became a regional newspaper covering Rogaland as well.

Fridthjof Bergmann was hired as editor in 1925, but was soon fired as he was suspected for working with a union with the Labour Party. Reinert Torgeirson was editor from 1925 to 1929, and Jens Galåen was editor from 1929. Arvid G. Hansen was hired as editor in 1936. In 1938 Johanna Bugge Olsen took over. However, financially the newspaper did not fare well, partly because the Communist Party prioritized to prop up Arbeideren, and Arbeidet was not released between 14 December 1938 and 30 March 1939. On 9 August 1940 (still with Olsen as editor) it stopped entirely because of the occupation of Norway by Nazi Germany. Olsen was later sentenced for treason during the legal purge in Norway after World War II, for having printed "un-national material" prior to its closing.

Arbeidet resumed publication from 9 May 1945, one day after the war's end, but became defunct after its last issue on 16 November 1949.
