= Torjus Værland =

Norwegian Minister of Social Affairs

Minister of Social Affairs
- In office 15 February 1928 – 12 May 1931
- Prime Minister: Johan Ludwig Mowinckel
- Preceded by: Alfred Madsen
- Succeeded by: Jakob Nilsson Vik

Personal details
- Born: 1868 Norway
- Died: 1954 (aged 85–86)
- Party: Liberal

Torjus Værland (1868-1954) was a Norwegian politician from the Liberal Party, who served as the Norwegian Minister of Social Affairs from 1928 to 1931. He was also a member of the Storting from 1919 to 1933.
