= Ny Tid (Trondheim) =

Norwegian newspaper

Ny Tid was a Norwegian newspaper established in 1899 by the typographers Joh. Halseth and Alf Scheflo at the same time as they established their own printing office in Trondheim. The publishers meant to create a worker's newspaper, not a socialist paper. When the first issue came out on 20 September, the newspaper was an organ of the Liberal Party of Norway, but the paper quickly became socialist and thus an organ of the labour movement and later the Norwegian Labour Party in Trondheim when the labour movement took over the paper in July 1900. The paper was first released weekly, but from 1902 on it was released daily.

The purpose for publishing was to propagandize the publishers' political view. Martin Tranmæl was a member of the first editing committee as a 20-year-old, and in 1906 became the editor of the paper. He held the position of editor until 1918, when he became party secretary for the Norwegian Labour Party.

It was under Tranmæl that the newspaper expanded. After Tranmæl left as editor, Ny Tid became a radical opposition newspaper.

In 1921, the Norwegian Labour Party split, creating a Social Democratic Labour Party of Norway. The social democrats established their own newspaper, Trøndelag Social-Demokrat, but this had little effect on the circulation of Ny Tid. The second party split, which came in 1923, ended with the communists becoming a large percentage of the party in Trondheim; they thereby retained the party's property, including Ny Tid which became an organ for the Communist Party of Norway. The Labour Party in Sør-Trøndelag established the year after Arbeider-Avisen.

Ny Tid marketed themselves in the 1930s as an opponent of the Nazis and Fascism. After the Spanish Civil War broke out, Ny Tid wrote on their front page "Lys fascismen og krigen i bann. Fram til antikrigs og antifascistmøte i morgen på Reina".

The circulation of Ny Tid fell along with the communist's lowering support, especially after Johan Nygaardsvolds cabinet came to power in 1935. The Nygaardsvold government created increased support for the Norwegian Labour Party in Nygaardsvold's part of the country; the Arbeider-Avisen profited from this.

In March 1939, Ny Tid was shut down while having competition from Arbeider-Avisen.

NKP's increased popularity after the Second World War, gave a resurrected circulation to Ny Tid. The newspaper continued circulating until July 1945, but shut down for the second time in eight years in May 1947.

== Editors ==
- 1899–1903: Ivar Angell-Olsen
- 1903–1908: Anders Buen
- 1908–1911: Martin Tranmæl
- 1911–1912: Anders Buen
- 1913–1918: Martin Tranmæl
- 1918–1919: Christian Hilt
- 1919: Knut Olai Thornæs
- 1920: Alfred Madsen
- 1920–1934: Knut Olai Thornæs
- 1934–1939: Jørgen Vogt
- 1939–1945: defunct
- 1945–1947: Jørgen Vogt
