= Norges Kommunistblad =

Norwegian newspaper

- Type: Daily newspaper
- Founded: 5 November 1923
- Ceased publication: 1 November 1929
- Political alignment: Communist
- Language: Norwegian
- Headquarters: Oslo, Norway

Norges Kommunistblad was a daily newspaper published in Oslo, Norway.

== History ==
Norges Kommunistblad was started on 5 November 1923 as the official party newspaper from the Communist Party, which was established that year after a split from the Labour Party. The first editor was Olav Scheflo. It went defunct after its last issue on 31 October 1929, and was replaced as party newspaper by Arbeideren.

Scheflo stopped editing one week after the 1924 Norwegian parliamentary election. He was disappointed with the Communist Party, especially its attitudes to the recent Iron Workers' Strike, which failed. Scheflo also served a prison sentence in early 1925. Olav Larssen was acting editor in his absence. At the Communist Party national convention in the spring of 1925, Scheflo was reinstated. After Olav Scheflo, Christian Hilt took over the newspaper in September 1926 and edited it until February 1927, when he was called to Moscow. Albin Eines then took over. When Eines was absent in July and August because of a prison sentence, Trond Hegna was the acting editor. Members of Mot Dag, namely Hegna, Johan Vogt, Carl Viggo Lange and Sverre Kolltveit, exercised a considerable influence in the whole of Eines' editor period. Eines was again editor in the autumn, but from November 1927 Christian Hilt had his second spell as editor, decreasing the Mot Dag influence. Arvid G. Hansen edited from 1929 until the bankruptcy. Hansen continued as editor of Arbeideren.
