= Meldungen aus Norwegen =

Series of reports on the situation during the German occupation of Norway

Meldungen aus Norwegen (Reports from Norway) is a series of reports on the situation in occupied Norway during World War II, by the Oslo department of the German Sicherheitspolizei (SiPo) and Sicherheitsdienst (SD). The reports were edited by Georg Wolff and sent to the Reich Security Main Office. They were distributed to German military leaders in Norway and Germany. They were typically structured with a section on the general situation (German: Allgemeine Lage), a section on the resistance movement (German: Gegner), and other details (German: Lebensgebiete).
