= Henry Wilhelm Kristiansen =

Norwegian newspaper editor and politician

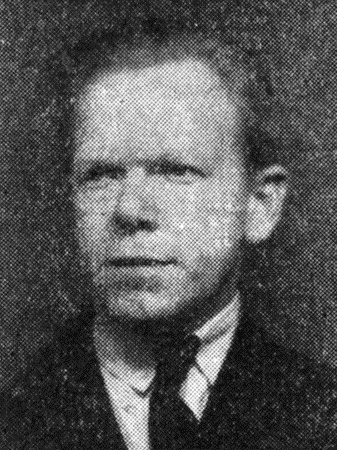

Chairman of the Communist Party of Norway
- In office 1931–1934
- Preceded by: Peder Furubotn
- Succeeded by: Adam Egede-Nissen

Personal details
- Born: February 12, 1902 Drammen, Norway
- Died: January 16, 1942 (aged 39) Neuengamme concentration camp, Nazi Germany
- Resting place: Skien, Norway
- Party: Communist Party of Norway (1923-)
- Other political affiliations: Labour Party (1916-1923)
- Spouse: Mirjam Rathaus
- Parent(s): Martin Wilhelm Kristiansen; Gina Olsen
- Occupation: Politician, journalist

Henry Wilhelm Kristiansen (12 February 1902 – 16 January 1942) was a Norwegian newspaper editor and politician for the Communist Party. He served as party chairman from 1931 to 1934, and then as editor-in-chief of the party organ Arbeideren from 1934 until 1940. Due to the Nazi German occupation of Norway, the newspaper was closed in 1940, and Kristiansen was deported together with his wife in 1941, and died in Neuengamme concentration camp.

== Early life ==
He was born in Drammen as the son of Martin Wilhelm Kristiansen and his wife Gina, née Olsen. He married the Russian Jew Mirjam Rathaus in 1928. The family settled in Nordstrand.

He joined the Norges Socialdemokratiske Ungdomsforbund in 1916, but at the Labour-Communist party split in 1923, he joined the Young Communist League. He had a brief stint as chairman of the Young Communist League in 1923.

== Political career ==
In 1925 he became a member of the Communist Party politburo. After a stay in the Soviet Union from 1929 to 1931, he returned to Norway in 1931 to become party chairman. He was removed in 1934 at the hands of Comintern. Instead, he became editor-in-chief of the official party newspaper Arbeideren.

On 9 April 1940, Norway was invaded and occupied by Nazi Germany. The Communist Party and Arbeideren originally declared themselves neutral. On 16 August 1940, however, the Communist Party was outlawed, and the newspaper Arbeideren was shut down by the authorities. Kristiansen was arrested, but was released shortly thereafter. He continued as an underground member of the Communist Party, and is considered as the de facto party chairman during this period.

Kristiansen was arrested on 22 June 1941, the same day as Operation Barbarossa commenced. In November 1941 he and Johan Strand Johansen were arrested and deported on the SS Donau to Hamburg. In December he was sent to Neuengamme concentration camp, where he died in January 1942. His urn was sent to Skien and buried there. His wife Mirjam, identified as Jewish, was deported with him. She was sent via Ravensbrück to Auschwitz where she was murdered in a gas chamber in May 1942. She had previously been married to Arvid G. Hansen 1921-1928.

Arbeideren was not continued after the war's end in 1945. In 1948, during the legal purge in Norway after World War II, an indictment towards Arbeideren was considered because of the neutral alignment after 9 April 1940—however, since the editor-in-chief Kristiansen was deceased, the case was closed.

Party political offices
Preceded by Peder Furubotn	Chairman of the Communist Party; 1931–1934	Succeeded by Adam Egede-Nissen
Media offices
Preceded by	Editor-in-chief of Arbeideren; 1934–1940	Succeeded by position defunct
