= Friheten =

Biweekly newspaper in Norway

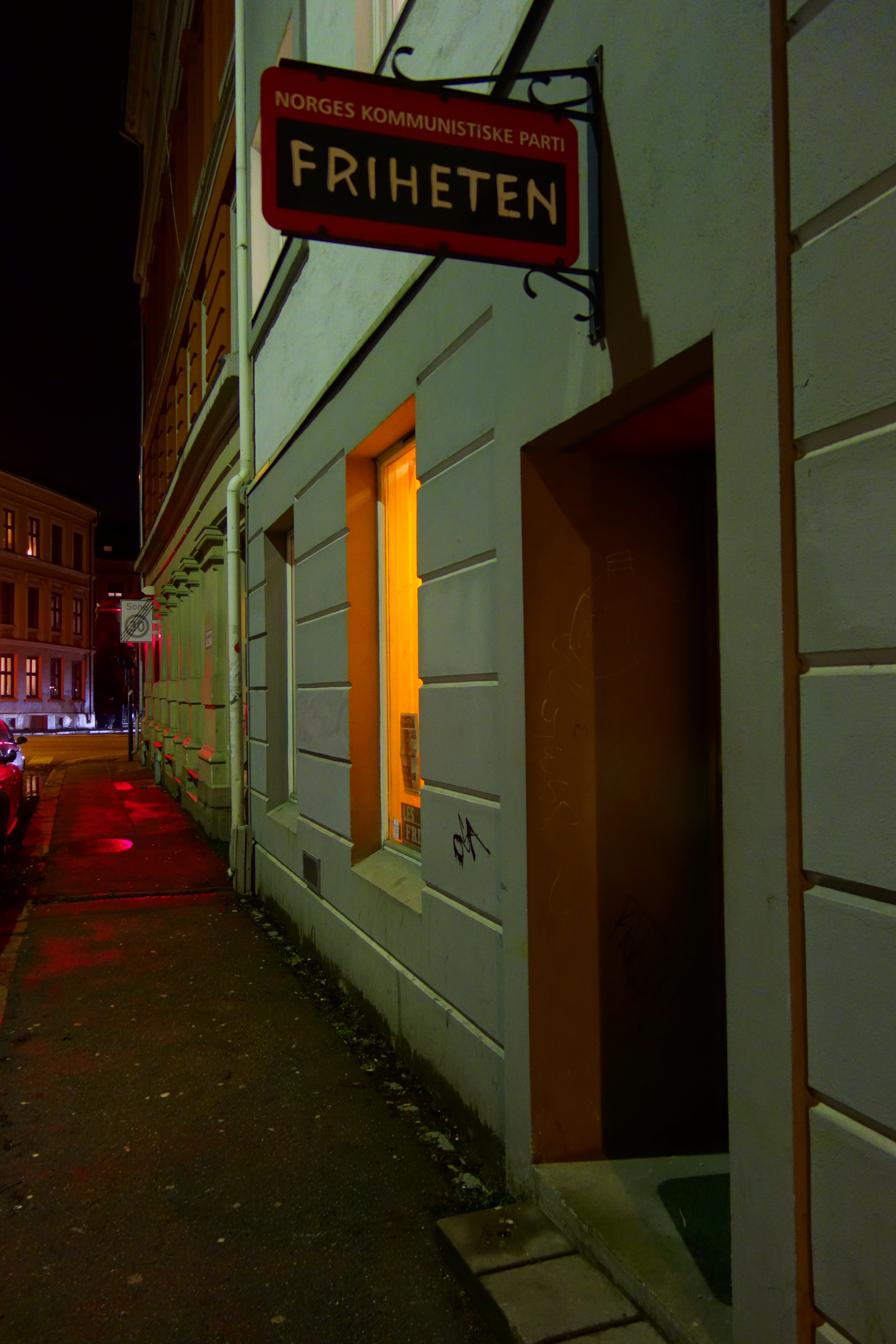
- The editorial offices of Friheten
- Type: Biweekly newspaper
- Owner(s): Norwegian Communist Party
- Founded: 1941; 84 years ago
- Political alignment: Norwegian Communist Party
- Language: Norwegian
- Headquarters: Oslo, Norway
- Website: www.friheten.no

Friheten (English: Freedom) is a Norwegian language biweekly newspaper, published by the Norwegian Communist Party (NKP).

== History and profile ==
Friheten was founded illegally in 1941 during the German occupation of Norway due to World War II. The founders were the members of the communist wing of the resistance movement. The paper was started as a news sheet by the group and became a regular newspaper with the publication of its first issue on 14 May 1945. After the liberation in 1945 it emerged as the official party newspaper.

It is the last party-dependent newspaper left in Norway. The paper has its headquarters in Oslo.

The editor is Harald Øystein Reppesgaard.
