= Klassekampen (1909–1940) =

Norwegian newspaper

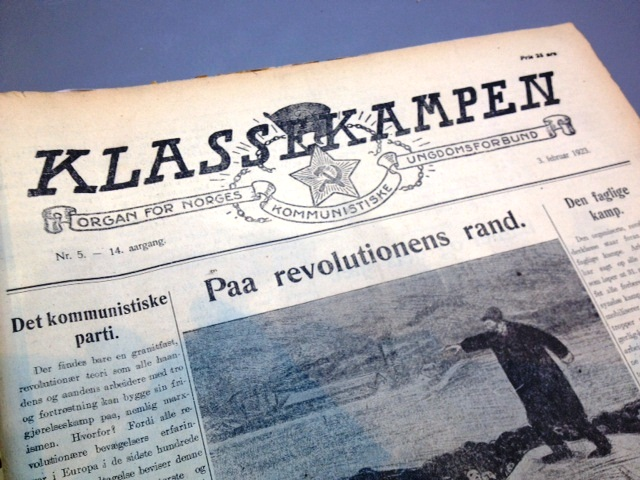
Klassekampen in 1923

Klassekampen ('The Class Struggle') was a Norwegian newspaper. It was established in 1909 as an organ for the youth movement of the Norwegian Labour Party, Norges socialdemokratiske ungdomsforbund. Its editor-in-chief from 1911 to 1921 was Eugène Olaussen.

At the Labour-Communist party split in 1923, the newspaper was usurped by the Young Communist League of Norway. Its first editor-in-chief following the split was Jørgen Vogt. It ceased to exist during the German occupation of Norway in 1940, and did not resurface after the occupation.
