= Martin Tranmæl =

Norwegian socialist leader

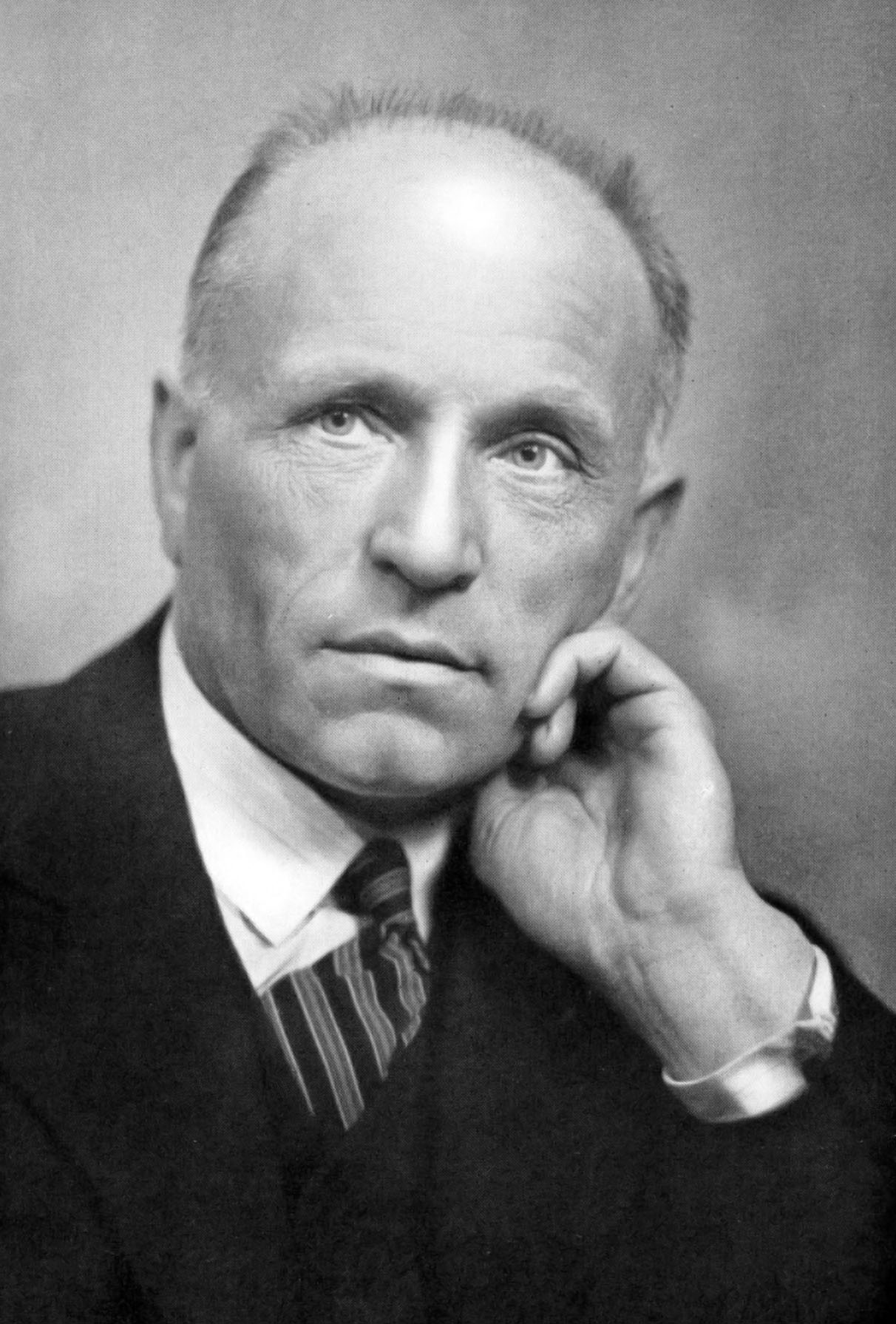
- Born: 27 June 1879; Melhus Municipality, Norway
- Died: 11 July 1967 (aged 88); Oslo
- Occupation: Politician

Martin Olsen Tranmæl (27 June 1879 – 11 July 1967) was a Norwegian socialist leader from The Norwegian Labour Party.

== Biography ==
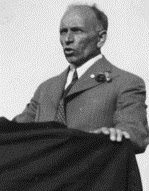
Martin Tranmæl

Martin Tranmæl grew up on a middle-sized farm in Melhus Municipality, in Søndre Trondhjem county, Norway. He started working as a painter and construction worker. In the early 20th century, Tranmæl lived for a while in the United States where he came into contact with the American workers movement, and even though he joined the AFL, he was also present at the founding congress of the Industrial Workers of the World, whose revolutionary syndicalist ideology he continued to be influenced by after returning to Norway. Upon his return, he eventually joined Norwegian Labour Party where he soon became one of the main leaders of the Party's left wing and worked for many different socialist papers.

Tranmæl became a Communist after learning of the Russian Revolution of 1917, and he attended Comintern meetings in Russia and encouraged the Norwegian Labour Party to join the Communist International organization and accept the Twenty-one Conditions for membership. Eventually Tranmæl led the Norwegian Labour Party out of the Comintern after a conflict with its chairman Zinoviev in 1923. The Party was split in two and the Communist Party of Norway was formed that year by people who wanted to stay in the Comintern.

He participated in the Left Communist Youth League's military strike action of 1924. He agitated for it through the newspaper Arbeiderbladet, and was convicted for this crime and sentenced to 5 months days of prison.

During World War II and the Nazi occupation of Norway, Tranmæl had to leave Norway and exiled in Stockholm, Sweden. He had many friends there like Zeth Höglund and Ture Nerman. After the war he returned to Norway, and while still a socialist, had more moderate views and supported the Norwegian membership in NATO in 1949.

== Selected works ==
- De faglige kampmidler og organisasjonsformer, (1911)
- Hvad fagopposisjonen vil, (1913)
- Hvem vil borgerkrig?, (1915)
- Socialisme og de socialistiske fremgangslinjer, (1918)
- Revolutionær fagbevægelse, (1920)
- Cellebetragtninger, (1922)
- Arbeiderungdom! Et alvorsord fra fengslet, arbeiderungdommen og kommunismen, (1925)

== Sources ==
- Olsen, Bjorn Gunnar (1991) Tranmæl og hans menn
- Zachariassen, Aksel (1979) Martin Tranmæl
- Lie, Haakon (1988) Martin Tranmæl

Party political offices
Preceded by Magnus Nilssen	Party secretary of the Labour Party; 1918–1923	Succeeded by Einar Gerhardsen
Preceded by Einar Gerhardsen	Party secretary of the Labour Party; 1925–1936	Succeeded by Einar Gerhardsen
Media offices
Preceded by Olav Scheflo	Chief editor of Arbeiderbladet; 1921–1949 (publication stopped 1940–1945)	Succeeded by Olav Larssen
