= Østerdalens Arbeiderblad =

Norwegian newspaper

Østerdalens Arbeiderblad was a Norwegian newspaper, published in Elverum in Hedmark county. It was named Østerdalens Social-Demokrat from 1915 to 1919 and Hedmark Fylkes Arbeiderblad from 1923 to 1925.

== Pre-history ==
The Labour Party for many years lacked an organ in the region Østerdalen. The region was to a certain degree covered by Hedemarkens Amts Socialdemokrat (Solungen) from 1908, and by Demokraten from September 1909. Northern Østerdalen was to a certain degree covered by Røros newspaper Arbeidets Rett. In April 1913 the board of the party chapter in Southern Østerdalen (a constituency for general elections) decided to start working for their own newspaper. They first tried to negotiate with Solungen, but to no avail, and Solungen also went defunct. In May 1915 the party chapter definitely decided to print their own newspaper.

== History ==
Østerdalens Social-Demokrat was started on 7 July 1915. The first editor was Olav Sæter, and "faktor" was Johs. Borchgrevink. In January 1916 Olav Vegheim was hired as manager and sub-editor. The name was changed to Østerdalens Arbeiderblad in 1919. In 1922 Sæter was elected to the Parliament of Norway, and Johannes Stubberud became acting editor-in-chief.

The newspaper struggled financially. In 1921 there were proposals to merge the newspaper into Demokraten. It was rejected for the time being, but a committee to work with this question was named in 1923. When it became clear that the Labour Party might be split in two, the board Østerdalens Arbeiderblad sympathized with the communist opposition, prompting Stubberud to resign and be replaced by acting editor Evald O. Solbakken. On 10 November 1923, after the Communist Party of Norway was founded and Arbeideren (the new name of Demokraten) aligned with that, a conference was held where most people agreed that Østerdalens Arbeiderblad should be discontinued and Arbeideren take over as organ for Østerdalen. On 11 November the tide turned completely as the supervisory council decided that Østerdalens Arbeiderblad should side with the Labour Party. Elverum Labour Party also decided to stay in the party instead of following the communists. Solbakken was fired, and Sæter returned. He remained so until 1932. Other acting editors during the newspaper's existence were Gerhard Iversen, Georg Svendsen and Johs. Borchgrevink.

As the Labour Party had lost both Arbeideren of Hamar and Glomdalens Arbeiderblad of Kongsvinger, Østerdalens Arbeiderblad became the party organ for the entire Hedmark county. It was subsequently renamed to Hedmark Fylkes Arbeiderblad in December 1923, and had local offices in Hamar and Kongsvinger. It remained under that name until July 1925, when Hamar Arbeiderblad was set up as an alternative for the Hamar district. The name was reverted. In the southern county where the Labour Party still had no newspaper, Østerdalens Arbeiderblad published a "spin-off product" called Solør-Odal Arbeiderblad. This ended in 1926 when Kongsvinger Arbeiderblad was established, from the ashes of the now-defunct Glomdalens Arbeiderblad.

Several local party chapters in Østerdalen felt it unnecessary to have three newspapers in the county. Discussions whether to have one, two or three newspapers took place over the next years. In 1932 the county convention in the Labour Party asked the local chapters in Østerdalen what they wanted. When seven chapters signalized the wish for Hamar Arbeiderblad as their regional newspaper, Hamar Arbeiderblad set up an office in Rena. The people in Elverum Labour Party and Østerdalens Arbeiderblad gave up. After its last issue on 2 December 1932, the newspaper was incorporated into Hamar Arbeiderblad. Hamar Arbeiderblad moved its Rena office to Elverum; the office was bombed asunder by Germany during the Norwegian Campaign.
