= Newth =

Newth is a surname. Notable people with the surname include:

- Brian Newth (born 1947), New Zealand modern pentathlete
- David Newth (1921-1988), British zoologist
- Eirik Newth (born 1964), Norwegian astrophysicist
- George Samuel Newth (1851–1936), English chemist
- Jonathan Newth (born 1939), British actor
- Mette Newth (born 1942), Norwegian illustrator and author of children's literature
- Philip Newth (born 1939), Anglo-Norwegian author of children's literature
