= Arbeideren (Hamar) =

Newspaper

- Founder: Olav Kringen
- Editor: see text.
- Founded: 15 September 1909
- Ceased publication: 4 October 1929
- Political alignment: Labour (1909–1923); Communist (1924–1929)
- Language: Norwegian
- Headquarters: Hamar
- Country: Norway

Arbeideren (lit. 'The Worker') was a Norwegian newspaper, published in Hamar in Hedmark county. It was started in 1909 as the press organ of the Labour Party in Hedemarken and its adjoining regions, and was called Demokraten ("The Democrat") until 1923. It was issued three days a week between 1909 and 1913, six days a week in 1914, three days a week again between 1914 and 1918 before again increasing to six days a week. It was renamed to Arbeideren in 1923, and in the same year it was taken over by the Norwegian Communist Party. The Communist Party incorporated the newspaper Gudbrandsdalens Arbeiderblad into Arbeideren in 1924, and until 1929 the newspaper was published under the name Arbeideren og Gudbrandsdalens Arbeiderblad. After Arbeideren had gone defunct, the name was used by the Communist Party for other newspapers elsewhere.

The chief editors of the newspaper were Olav Kringen (1909–1913), Ole Holmen (1912–1913), Fredrik Monsen (1913–1916), Paul O. Løkke (1916–1919), Alfred Aakermann (1919–1920), Olav Larssen (1920–1927), and finally Trond Hegna, Ingvald B. Jacobsen, Olav Scheflo, Eivind Petershagen, and Jørgen Vogt (between 1927 and 1929). Fredrik Monsen, Evald O. Solbakken and Knut Olai Thornæs were acting editors from 1924 to 1925.

== Pre-history ==
Demokraten was originally the name of a short-lived newspaper in Hamar started by Leopold Rasmussen in 1852, connected to the Marcus Thrane movement. Rasmussen started a second newspaper, Oplands-Posten, in Hamar later in 1852, to compete with his own Demokraten. An organ for the social liberal labour movement in the district, Arbeiderbladet existed from 1889 to 1892 and was published out of different cities, including in Hamar in the year 1890.

A countywide chapter of the Labour Party was established in Hedmark in mid-November 1904. After the countywide party convention in Stange in 1906, the convention summary had to be printed in the Kristiania-based newspaper Social-Demokraten, as it lacked its own local newspaper. The county board thus decided to buy 1,500 copies of the Social-Demokraten to distribute to its members. There was a growing notion that the party needed its own newspaper. In the same year, the labour movement in Solør (south of Hedmark) bought the paper Solungen, which had existed since 1904. The takeover came into effect on 1 January 1907, and publishing began the following year. Solungen pretended to be the labour movement organ for the whole of Hedmark, and outside of Solør it was published as Hedemarkens Amts Socialdemokrat (Solungen). However, the rest of Hedmark county was not satisfied with this solution.

== Labour Party period ==
=== 1909–1913 ===
An approximate map where Hedemarken is shown in blue, northern Østerdalen in red and southern Østerdalen in yellow.

The Hamar-based newspaper Demokraten ("The Democrat") was started on 15 September 1909. The initiator and first editor was Olav Kringen, who had ample experience as the editor of Social-Demokraten from 1903 until 1906. Demokraten was the Labour Party organ for the Mjøsa Cities and Hedemarken, but in its first years it also covered Gudbrandsdalen and Østerdalen, two northern regions. The name Østoplandenes Socialistiske Partiblad was considered for the newspaper, but the historical name Demokraten prevailed. The name was suggested by local Labour MP Karl Amundsen. Demokraten's coverage of Gudbrandsdalen soon ended, and in southern Østerdalen a new labour newspaper, Østerdalens Arbeiderblad, was set up in 1915. In northern Østerdalen, Arbeidets Rett was popular among the labour movement. According to reports in Demokraten the newspaper again began to cover news from a part of Gudbrandsdalen, namely the city Lillehammer, in 1912.

When it came to building up a new newspaper, Kringen had a certain personal drive, as he ran for parliament in 1909. When he lost the election, he also lost interest to a certain degree. He resigned in 1912 and Ole Holmen, a member of the municipal council of Vang Municipality, took over as chief editor. However, he ran afoul of other people involved with the newspaper and was fired in 1913.

Title, November 1913.

The newspaper originally had the tagline Socialistisk blad for Oplandene ("Socialist Paper for Oplandene"), but in 1910 this was changed to Talsmand for Arbeiderbevægelsen ("Spokesman for the Labour Movement"). It was printed by the company A. Sæther. The newspaper was issued three times a week until 1 July 1913, from which point it was increased to six times a week. As part of this ambitious increase, Demokraten also had 3,000 copies in circulation, unprecedented in its history.

=== 1913–1916 ===
In 1913 the newspaper's supervisory council hired school teacher Fredrik Monsen to be the new editor. Olav Larssen started his journalist career as a subeditor in the same year. In the newspaper's supervisory council vote, Monsen edged out Waldemar Carlsen with 22 to 4 votes, and also prevailed over other applicants who were seasoned editors, such as Ingvald Førre and Eugène Olaussen. Larssen prevailed over Carlsen and Førre in the vote for the new subeditor.

Only Monsen and Larssen were employed in the newspaper to work with editorial content. In 1913, Monsen managed to contract known personalities from the labour movement as "regular contributors". These were the nationally known figures Olav Kringen, Gunnar Ousland and Johan Falkberget, in addition to Lillehammer politician Petter Nilssen and the locally known politicians Arne Juland (later MP) and Andr. Juell. Danish expatriate Alfred Kruse joined in the autumn of 1913. However, according to Larssen, the prominent writers contracted to Demokraten "seldomly wrote" anything.

In his memoirs, Larssen wrote that Monsen was "often aggressive" as editor-in-chief, especially when writing editorials. He got several adversaries in the city's conservative community, especially after donning a badge with the broken rifle, a well-known anti-war symbol. The newspaper competed with the old and popular conservative Hamar Stiftstidende, the liberal left Oplandenes Avis, and the liberal Oplandet.

The practice of issuing the newspaper six days a week became harder after the outbreak of the First World War. The war caused a general rise in prices, and newspaper subscriptions and advertisements both declined. Demokraten had to revert to being issued three times a week starting 1 September 1914. In December 1914 it adopted a new tagline, Organ for arbeiderpartiet i Hamar og Hedemarksbygdene ("Organ for the Labour Party in Hamar and the Hamlets of Hedemarken").

=== 1916–1923 ===
Monsen and Larssen both left Demokraten in 1916. The next editors were Paul O. Løkke, who served from 1916 to 1919, and Alfred Aakermann, from 1919 to 1920. Larssen returned in 1920 as editor-in-chief. Georg Svendsen was the subeditor from 1918 until 1921, when Evald O. Solbakken started in the newspaper as subeditor. Still, there were only two people to deliver the editorial content.

As the war years went, the newspaper's finances gradually improved. The Norwegian state became more active in production and trade and contributed many advertisements. Demokraten acquired its own type-setting machine in October 1918 and a printing press in 1917, which it used from 1 January 1918. From 1 July 1918, circulation once again increased to six days a week.

== Communist Party period ==
In 1923, the newspaper was renamed Arbeideren ("The Worker"), and the first issue with this name was released on 1 May 1923, the International Workers' Day. The change followed a letter in 1922 from the Comintern Executive, which stated that no newspaper belonging to a Comintern member organization should have "Social Democrat" or "Democrat" as a part of its title. The printing press of the party changed its name accordingly, to Arbeiderens trykkeri.

Logo of Arbeideren og Gudbrandsdalens Arbeiderblad.

In the same year, 1923, the Labour Party broke out of the Comintern. Subsequently, the Communist Party broke away from the Labour Party. The local chapter of the Labour Party in Hamar decided to side with the Communist Party in November 1923, in a 123–22 vote. Arbeideren was then taken away from Labour, as the supervisory council decided by a 65 to 5 vote that it should follow the Communists. Arbeideren was one of thirteen Labour newspapers that broke away from the party and followed the Communists (one, Nordlys, later returned to Labour). Since 15 February 1924 the newspaper was published under the name Arbeideren og Gudbrandsdalens Arbeiderblad, as the Communist Party had seen fit to merge Arbeideren with Lillehammer-based Gudbrandsdalens Arbeiderblad.

Editor Larssen and subeditor Solbakken both joined the Communist Party in 1923 and continued running the newspaper. As Olav Larssen was asked by the party to be the acting editor of Norges Kommunistblad in the winter of 1924–1925, Fredrik Monsen, Evald Solbakken, and Knut Olai Thornæs were acting editors between 1924 and 1925. Larssen eventually drifted away from the mainstream of the Communist Party. In late 1926 and early 1927 he voiced his opinion in columns that the Communist Party should contribute to the imminent merger of the Labour Party and the Social Democratic Labour Party. A local party convention strongly rebuked this opinion. Larssen was thus replaced in January 1927 and left the Communist Party, and Solbakken soon followed suit. Fredrik Monsen left the party at the same time.

Information differs as to who replaced Larssen. According to Evald Solbakken, and also to the reference bibliography Norske aviser 1763–1969, the replacement was Olav Scheflo, who needed a stand-in, Ingvald B. Jacobsen, for the first period. According to the encyclopaedia Arbeidernes Leksikon and historian Einhart Lorenz, Trond Hegna was the editor in 1927, before he took over Norges Kommunistblad in the summer of 1927. Hegna's main job was to edit the periodical Mot Dag, but in this period the people of Mot Dag had an informal influence on the Communist Party and several of their newspapers. Scheflo formally edited the newspaper from 1927 to 1928, with Eivind Petershagen as acting editor from late 1927. In 1928 Petershagen formally took over, only to have Jørgen Vogt become acting editor later that year. Vogt took over in 1929.

As many newspapers belonging to the dwindling Communist Party, Arbeideren would cease to exist before the end of the 1920s. It was still published six times a week, but had to give up its printing press in 1929, switching to Samtrykk in Oslo. The last ever issue of Arbeideren og Gudbrandsdalens Arbeiderblad was published on 4 October 1929.

== Aftermath ==
A month after Arbeideren went defunct, the Communist Party gave its name to a new newspaper, which was set up as the new main newspaper of the Communist Party in 1930. This new paper was based in Oslo as the replacement of Norges Kommunistblad, which had been liquidated as well. Olav Larssen and Evald Solbakken found a new outlet in Hamar Arbeiderblad, which had been set up as the new Hamar organ of the Labour Party in 1925. The Communist Party later tried to create a weekly newspaper in Hamar, Rød Front, but it was short-lived and existed only between 1932 and 1933. The Oslo version of Arbeideren went defunct in 1940, and many years after that, the name was used from 1951 to 1953 for a third newspaper, published in Brumunddal, not far from Hamar city.

== Bibliography ==
- Høeg, Tom Arbo, ed. (1973). Norske aviser 1763–1969: en bibliografi (in Norwegian). Vol. 1. Oslo: University Library of Oslo.
- Larssen, Olav (1935). Beretning for Hamar Arbeiderblad gjennem 10 år (in Norwegian). Hamar: Hedmark Arbeiderblad.
- Larssen, Olav (1969). Sti gjennom ulendt terreng. Læretid, partistrid, ny vekst (in Norwegian). Oslo: Aschehoug.
- Lillevold, Eyvind, ed. (1948). Hamars historie (in Norwegian). Hamar: Hamar Stiftstidendes Trykkeri.
- Lorenz, Einhart (1983). Det er ingen sak å få partiet lite. NKP 1923–1931 (in Norwegian). Oslo: Pax. ISBN 82-530-1255-1.
- Maurseth, Per (1987). Gjennom kriser til makt 1920-1935. Volume three of Arbeiderbevegelsens historie i Norge (in Norwegian). Oslo: Tiden. ISBN 82-10-02753-0.
- Rønning, Ole Martin (2004). "Norges Kommunistiske Partis presse". Arbeiderhistorie (in Norwegian). Oslo: Labour Movement Archive and Library. ISSN 0801-7778.
- Rønning, Ole Martin (2010a). "Arbeideren". In Flo, Idar (ed.). Norske aviser fra A til Å. Volume four of Norsk presses historie 1660–2010 (in Norwegian). Oslo: Universitetsforlaget. p. 39. ISBN 978-82-15-01604-7.
- Rønning, Ole Martin (2010b). "Hamar Arbeiderblad". In Flo, Idar (ed.). Norske aviser fra A til Å. Volume four of Norsk presses historie 1660–2010 (in Norwegian). Oslo: Universitetsforlaget. p. 156. ISBN 978-82-15-01604-7.
- Solbakken, Evald O. (1950). Hamar Arbeiderblad gjennom 25 år (in Norwegian). Hamar: Hedmark Labour Party.
- Solbakken, Evald O. (1951). Det røde fylke. Trekk av den politiske arbeiderbevegelse i Hedmark gjennom 100 år (in Norwegian). Hamar: Hedmark Labour Party.
- Solbakken, Evald O., ed. (1955). Hamar Arbeiderblad's festskrift (in Norwegian). Hamar: Hedmark Arbeiderblad.
