= Karl Amundsen =

Norwegian politician

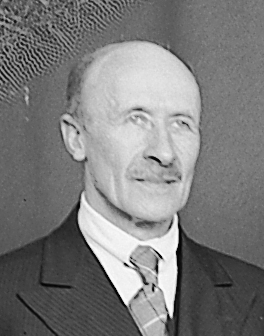
Karl Amundsen in 1935.

Karl Amundsen (10 November 1873 – 13 June 1961) was a Norwegian politician for the Labour and Communist parties.

He was born at Sjøndem in Brandval Municipality as a son of Amund Johannesen and Karen Hansdatter. He trained as a carpenter in Kristiania and worked in that trade until 1911. He moved to Løiten and was the manager of the district welfare fund there from 1911.

He chaired the county branch of the Labour Party, and was elected to the executive committee of the municipal council for Løiten Municipality. He was then elected to the Parliament of Norway in 1912 from the constituency Søndre Hedemarken. He was a member of the Standing Committee on Customs. In the 1915 election he won the first round of voting with 3,746 votes, but not by a large enough margin ahead of the runner-up. In the second round he faced the first round's loser, the independent candidate Karl Wilhelm Wefring, but lost with 4,379 votes against Wefring's 4,886. In the 1921 election he was a minor ballot candidate. In the 1924 election he had joined the Communist Party, created as a splinter from Labour in 1923, and was their fourth ballot candidate in Hedmark. He barely missed being elected as a deputy.

Amundsen is also known for conjuring up the name of the newspaper Demokraten. He was also a board member of the newspaper. He was a board member of Hamar Arbeiderblad from 1930 to 1932.
