= Mr. George =

Mr. George may refer to:

- Mr. George (group), an Australian musical group, formed in 1973
- Georg Svendsen (1894–1966), Norwegian journalist and crime novelist
- George W. Jenkins (1907–1996), American businessman who founded Publix Super Markets
- Character in Mr Don & Mr George
- Character in Mr. George and Other Odd Persons

== See also ==
- George (surname)
