= Evald O. Solbakken =

Norwegian newspaper editor and politician

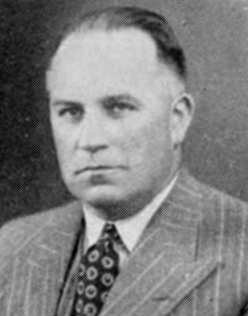
Evald O. Solbakken

Evald O. Solbakken (15 December 1898 – 4 March 1967) was a Norwegian newspaper editor and politician for the Labour and Communist parties.

He joined the Labour Party through membership in the youth association Freidig in Storhamar in 1917. His first political position was to be secretary here. He was hired as secretary in the trade information office in Hamar in 1920. In 1921 he was hired as subeditor in the Hamar newspaper Demokraten, where he succeeded Georg Svendsen. Solbakken's superior at the time, editor-in-chief Olav Larssen, has made note that Solbakken was among the last journalists in the labour press to be hired with primary education only.

After a short period in 1923 as editor-in-chief of Østerdal Arbeiderblad, he joined the Communist Party later in 1923 and became subeditor in Arbeideren (the new name of Demokraten). In 1927 he rejoined the Labour Party, and was hired as subeditor in Hamar Arbeiderblad. He was then editor-in-chief of Tidens Krav from 1928 to 1931, subeditor of Fremtiden from 1931 to 1934, then a journalist in Arbeiderbladet. From 1947 to 1961 he edited Hamar Arbeiderblad.

During World War II and the German occupation of Norway he was arrested on 4 December 1940, and imprisoned in Åkebergveien until 4 March 1941. He was arrested for the second time, and imprisoned in Møllergata 19 from 27 January to 23 April 1942, then in Grini concentration camp until 2 June 1942. He then spent time in exile in Sweden, where he helped lead the refugee centre Kjesäter towards the end of the war.

After the war he released the memoirs I fengsel og landflyktighet (1945), and several historical books: 50 års samvirke i hovedstaden (1945), Hamar Arbeiderblad gjennom 25 år (1950), Hamar Jern- og Metallarbeiderforening 50 år: 1900-1950 (1950), Det røde fylke gjennom 100 år (1951), Hedmark fylkes arbeiderparti 1904–12. november 1954 (1954) and Hamar arbeiderparti 1907–27. januar 1957 (1957). He became blind in his later life. He died in March 1967, and was buried in Hamar.
