= 1915 Norwegian parliamentary election =

- 21 October 1915 (first round); 4–11 November 1915 (second round)

All 123 seats in the Storting 62 seats needed for a majority
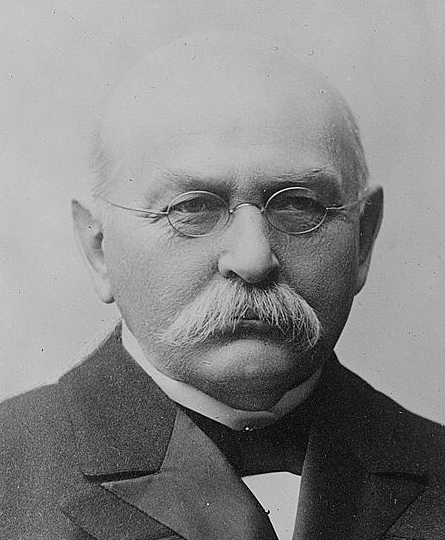

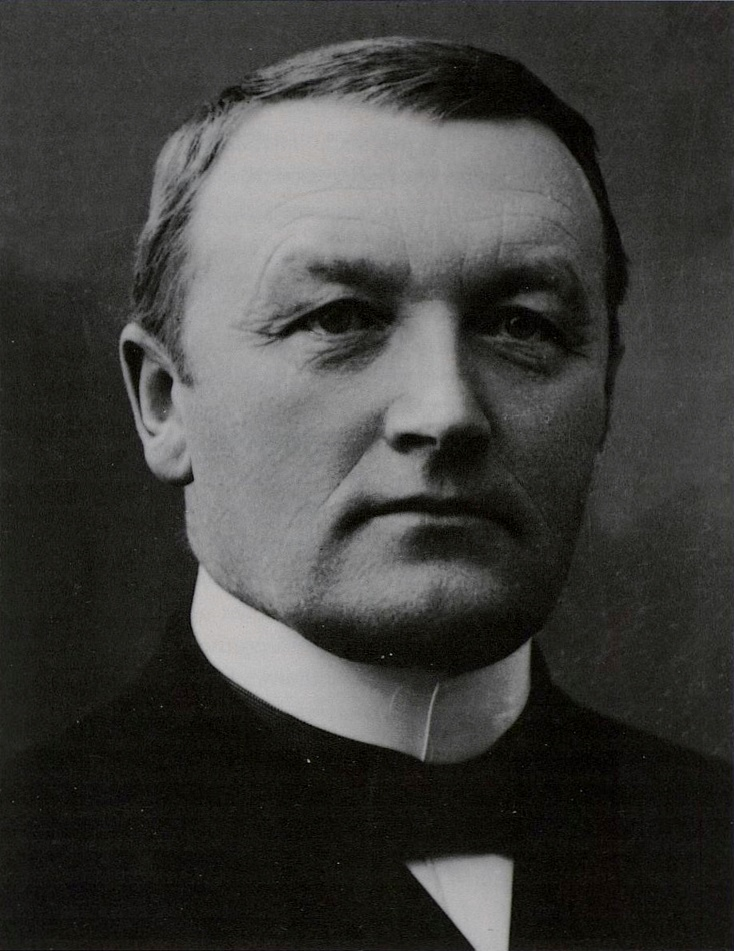

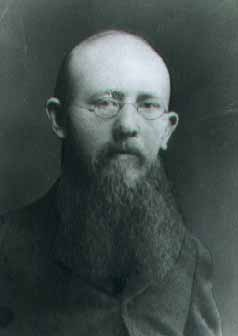

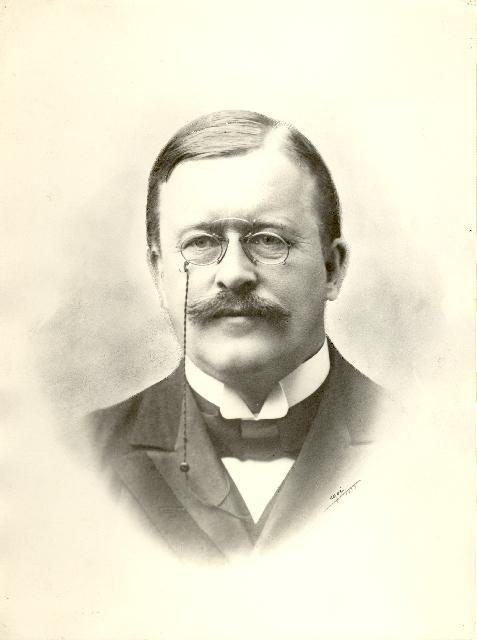

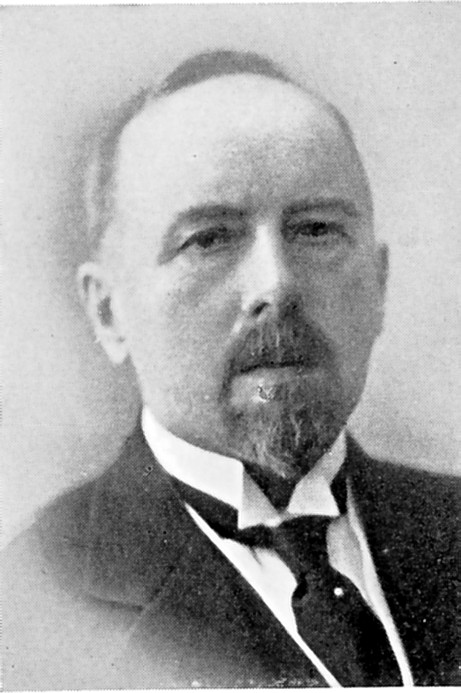

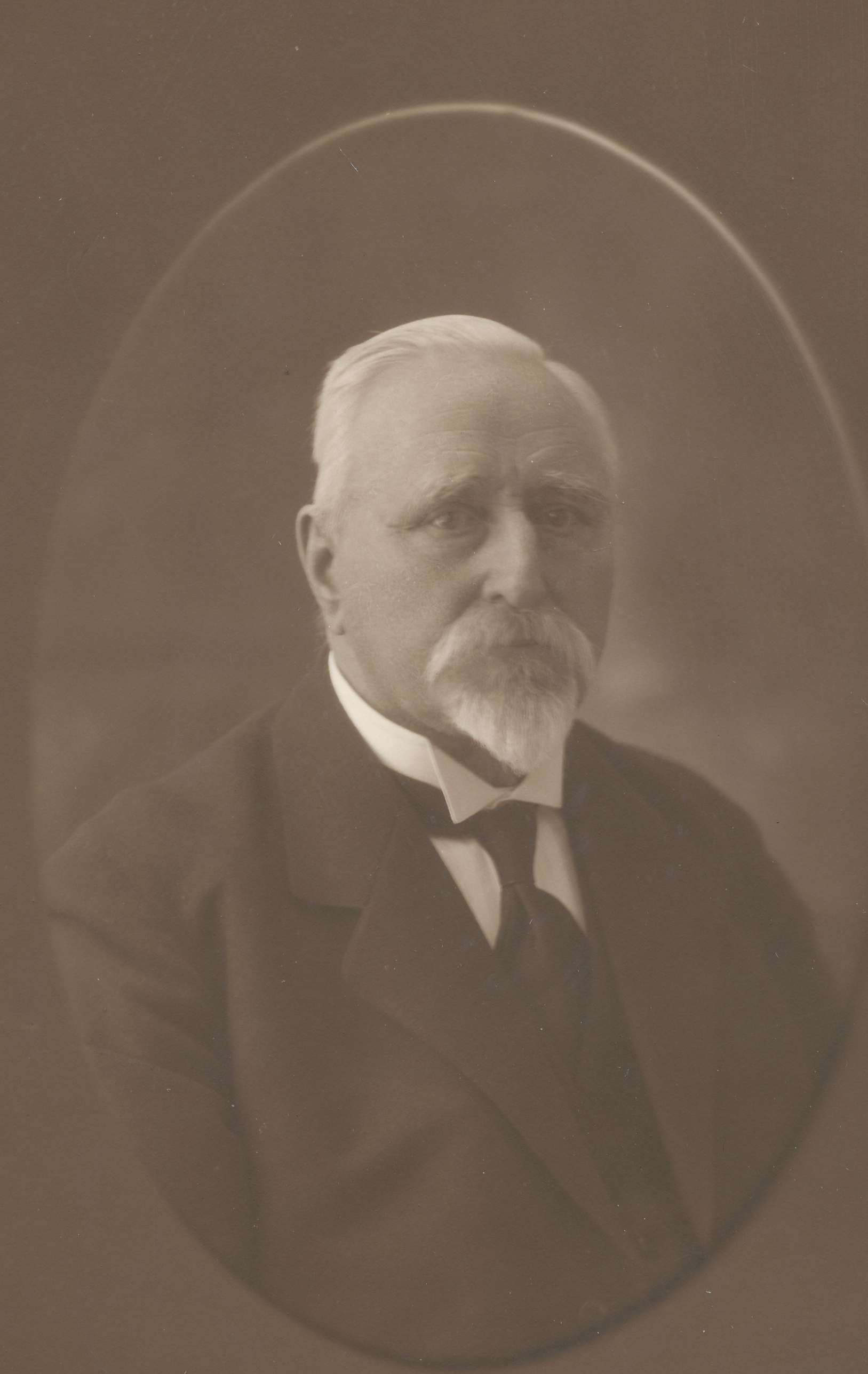
	First party	Second party	Third party
Leader	Gunnar Knudsen	Jens Bratlie	Christian Knudsen
Party	Liberal	Conservative	Labour
Last election	39.99%, 70 seats	33.15%, 20 seats	26.27%, 23 seats
Seats won	74	20	19
Seat change	▲4	Steady	▼4
Popular vote	204,243	179,028 (H+FV)	198,111
Percentage	33.07%	28.98% (H+FV)	32.07%
	Fourth party	Fifth party	Sixth party
Leader	Johan Castberg	William Nygaard	Johannes Okkenhaug
Party	Labour Democrats	Free-minded Liberal	Agrarian
Last election	6 seats with V	4 seats with H	–
Seats won	6	1	1
Seat change	Steady	▼3	New
Popular vote	25,658	Alliance with H	6,351
Percentage	4.15%	—	1.03%
Prime Minister before election
Gunnar Knudsen
Liberal
Prime Minister after election
Gunnar Knudsen
Liberal

Parliamentary elections were held in Norway on 21 October 1915, with a second round between 4 and 11 November. The result was a victory for the Liberal Party, which won 74 of the 123 seats in the Storting.

== Endorsements ==
=== National daily newspapers ===
Newspaper	Party endorsed
Arbeidets Rett	Labour Party
Glommendalens Social-Demokrat	Labour Party
Hortens Avis	Liberal Party
Vestfold Arbeiderblad	Labour Party

== Results ==
Party	Votes	%	Seats	+/–
Liberal Party	204,243	33.07	74	+4
Labour Party	198,111	32.07	19	–4
Conservative Party	179,028	28.98	20	0
Free-minded Liberal Party	179,028	28.98	1	–4
Labour Democrats	25,658	4.15	6	0
Norwegian Agrarian Association	6,351	1.03	1	New
Teetotaler Party	3,820	0.62	0	0
Peace Candidate	413	0.07	0	New
Independents			2	New
Wild votes	46	0.01	–	–
Total	617,670	100.00	123	0
Valid votes	617,670	98.68		
Invalid/blank votes	8,285	1.32		
Total votes	625,955	100.00		
Registered voters/turnout	1,086,657	57.60		
Source: Nohlen & Stöver
