= SolungAvisa =

Norwegian newspaper

SolungAvisa is a local newspaper published in Flisa, Norway. It covers news from Grue Municipality, Åsnes Municipality, and Våler Municipality.

It was established by the owners of the newspapers Østlendingen as Avisen Solungen in 2008. The newspaper Glåmdalen protested against the name, since they on 29 February 2008 had applied to the Norwegian Industrial Property Office for the right of the name Solungen, which was a newspaper they had absorbed in 1915. The owners of Avisen Solungen were persuaded (through a settlement) to use the name SolungAvisa.
