= Vardø Framtid =

Norwegian newspaper

- Type: Weekly newspaper
- Founded: 1949
- Ceased publication: 1951
- Political alignment: Communist Party of Norway (NKP)
- Language: Norwegian
- Headquarters: Vardø, Finnmark, Norway
- Circulation: 750 (spring 1950)

Vardø Framtid was a Norwegian newspaper published in Vardø in Finnmark county.

Vardø Framtid was started as a weekly newspaper in 1949 as the Communist Party of Norway (NKP) organ in the city. For two years the party had had a newspaper, Øst-Finnmark, covering the whole region. Both of these newspapers went defunct in 1951.

The small NKP newspaper was established against all odds, at a time when the NKP press was struggling. It was a simple and primitive publication, printed using a mimeograph. Its circulation in the spring of 1950 was 750 copies and the newspaper was published weekly.

First and foremost behind the newspaper was Martin Gunnar Knutsen, who later became the chairman of the NKP. He was working during these years as a teacher in Vardø. Knutsen left the city and moved south in June 1950, but he continued to send weekly articles to the newspaper in the north. Fritz Kramer took over as editor after Knutsen.

The distributor for the small newspaper was Bjarne Karlsen, and then Arne Hågensen.

== Editors ==
- Martin Gunnar Knutsen, 1949–1950
- Fritz Kramer, 1950–1951
