= Arbeideren (Brumunddal) =

Norwegian newspaper

Arbeideren was a Norwegian newspaper, published in Brumunddal in Hedmark county. Arbeideren was started on 16 March 1951 as the Communist Party organ in Hedmark county. It lent its name from two former newspapers called Arbeideren, one in neighboring Hamar and one in Oslo. The party was reasonably strong in the county, with the last MP elected on the Communist Party ticket, Emil Løvlien, hailing from Hedmark. However, it was not strong enough and the newspaper went defunct after its last issue on 22 October 1953.
