= Per Lothar Lindtner =

Norwegian politician

Leader of the Communist Party of Norway
- In office 1993–2001
- Preceded by: Ingve Iversen
- Succeeded by: Zafer Gözet

Personal details
- Born: December 27, 1947 (age 78) Bergen, Norway
- Party: Communist Party of Norway
- Spouse: Unni Hovden
- Parent: Lothar Lindtner
- Relatives: Lasse Lindtner (brother)
- Occupation: Politician

Per Lothar Lindtner (born 1947) is a Norwegian politician. Lindtner was the head of the Communist Party of Norway from 1993 to 2001, serving in a collective leadership with Terje Krogh and Kjell Underlid from 1993 to 1998, and with Underlid from 1998 to 2000. He is a member of the party's Hordaland unit. He headed the party's ticket in Hordaland in the 2001 Norwegian parliamentary election.

Lindtner is the son of the actor Lothar Lindtner and the brother of the actor Lasse Lindtner. He is married to Unni Hovden.
