= Paul O. Løkke =

Norwegian newspaper editor and politician

Paul Olsen Løkke (12 December 1879 – 1937) was a Norwegian newspaper editor and politician for the Labour and Social Democratic Labour parties.

He was born in Vaage Municipality (now spelled Vågå). He joined his first trade union in 1906, and in the city of Tønsberg he was a board member of the local Union of Iron and Metalworkers from 1908 to 1912 and local Labour Party leader from 1910 to 1913. He ran for Parliament in Tønsberg in 1912, but was not elected.

He was the editor-in-chief of the Larvik newspaper Nybrott and the Hamar newspaper Demokraten before taking over Vestfold Arbeiderblad in 1920. When his Labour Party split in 1921, Løkke joined the more right-wing Social Democratic Labour Party. He chaired the party chapter in Tønsberg fra 1923 to 1925. He edited Buskerud Social-Demokrat from 1921 to 1923 and Vestfold Social-Demokrat from 1923 to 1925. He died in 1937.
