= Ingvald B. Jacobsen =

Norwegian newspaper editor (1891–1945)

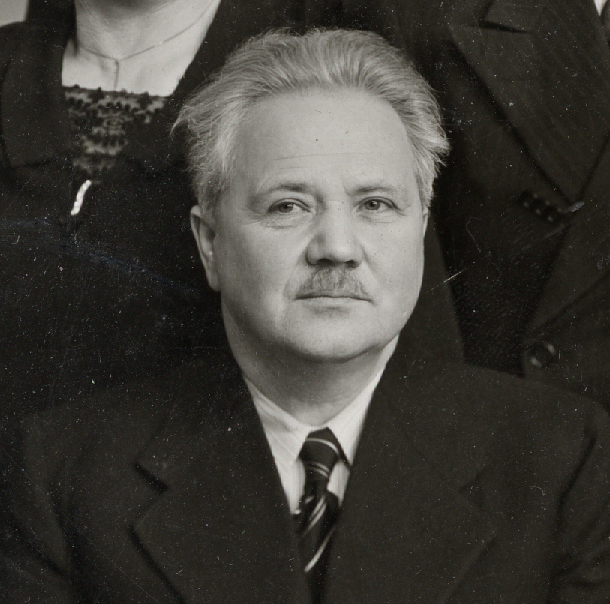
Ingvald Jacobsen

Ingvald Bernhoft Jacobsen (15 April 1891 – 1 February 1945) was a Norwegian newspaper editor.

He was born in Alstahaug Municipality, and in his early career he worked as a fisher and seaman, then a typographer. He edited the newspaper Rjukan, but was fired in 1912 for political reasons. He was first active in a trade union and the Norges Socialdemokratiske Ungdomsforbund before joining the Norwegian Labour Party in 1914. He was hired as subeditor of the party's newspaper Sørlandets Socialdemokrat in 1915, and was promoted to editor of Tidens Krav in 1918 and Tiden in 1921.

In 1923 there was mounting differences between two wings in the Labour Party, and Jacobsen was deemed too Moscow-friendly by the party members who controlled Tiden. He was fired from the editor position in Tiden in anticipation of a party split, and that way it was prevented that Tiden fell into control of the Moscow-friendly wing. When the Moscow-friendly Communist Party was established later in 1923, Jacobsen joined them.

He was hired in the communist newspaper Ny Tid in 1924, and was a board member of the Communist Party in Trondheim. He stayed in Ny Tid until 1936, except for a period as acting editor of Arbeideren og Gudbrandsdalens Arbeiderblad in 1927. He afterwards returned to the Labour Party and its newspaper in Trondheim, Arbeider-Avisen, where he worked for one year. He edited Tiden again from 1937 to 1938 before returning to Arbeider-Avisen.

During the occupation of Norway by Nazi Germany he was arrested by the Nazi authorities in March 1942. He was first imprisoned in Falstad concentration camp, then shipped to Sachsenhausen concentration camp in December 1943. In December 1944 he was transferred to Dora concentration camp, where he died in February 1945. He was married and had two children.
