= Rød Front (newspaper) =

Norwegian newspaper

Rød Front ('Red Front') was a Norwegian newspaper, published in Hamar in Hedmark county.

== History and profile ==
Rød Front was started as a weekly newspaper in 1932 as the Communist Party of Norway organ in the vicinity. It went defunct already in October/November 1933. It had a predecessor in Arbeideren, which had stopped in 1929.
