= Øst-Finnmark (newspaper) =

Norwegian newspaper

Øst-Finnmark was a Norwegian newspaper, published in Kirkenes in Finnmark county.

Øst-Finnmark was started as a weekly newspaper in 1947 as the Communist Party of Norway organ in the region. A second Communist newspaper in the region was Vardø Framtid. Both these newspapers went defunct in 1951.
