= Eivind Petershagen =

Norwegian newspaper editor and politician (1888–1965)

Eivind Petershagen (19 March 1888 – 30 July 1965) was a Norwegian newspaper editor and politician for the Communist Party.

He was a smallholder and forest worker by profession. He was a member of the Labour Party since 1916, but joined the Communist Party in 1923. He was a member of the municipal council for Åmot Municipality for 28 years, and served as mayor from 1923 to 1925, in 1945 and from 1946 to 1947. He chaired the Communist Party branch in Hedmark from 1923 to 1925, and in the 1924 Norwegian parliamentary election he was elected to the Parliament of Norway. He served as a deputy parliamentary representative during the terms 1928–1930 and 1945–1949, and also stood for parliamentary election in 1930 without success.

He was the editor of Norges Kommunistblad for a short period during the summer of 1928, and the editor of Arbeideren from 1928 to 1929.
