= Halden Dagblad =

Norwegian newspaper

- Type: Free newspaper
- Owner(s): A-pressen (100%)
- Editor: Trine Bakke
- Founded: 2000
- Ceased publication: 2009
- Headquarters: Halden, Norway

Halden Dagblad was a free newspaper published in Halden, Norway.

It was wholly owned by the media company A-pressen. It was established with the purpose of competing with Halden Arbeiderblad in the advertising market.

It was closed in 2009.
