= Lothar Lindtner =

Norwegian actor (1917–2005)

Per Lothar Lindtner
- Born: July 22, 1917; Bergen, Norway
- Died: April 14, 2005 (aged 87); Bergen, Norway
- Occupation: Actor
- Years active: 1925–2005
- Notable work: Fleksnes Fataliteter (1982)
- Political party: Communist Party of Norway
- Children: Lasse Lindtner
- Awards: King's Medal of Merit (1968); Knight of St. Olav (1982)

Per Lothar Lindtner (July 22, 1917 – April 14, 2005) was a Norwegian actor.

== Early life ==
Lindtner was born in Bergen and played a large number of roles at the National Theatre in Oslo. He is considered one of the greatest actors Bergen has produced in recent times, with roles such as Bosch in Jan Herwitz, Vingrisen in Nordahl Grieg's Our Power and Our Glory, a variety of roles in several of Shakespeare's plays, Njegus in The Merry Widow, Leopold in The White Horse Inn, Per in Erasmus Montanus, and Loman in Death of a Salesman. He is remembered for the songs "Trikkevisen" and "Bauekorpsgutten".

== Career ==
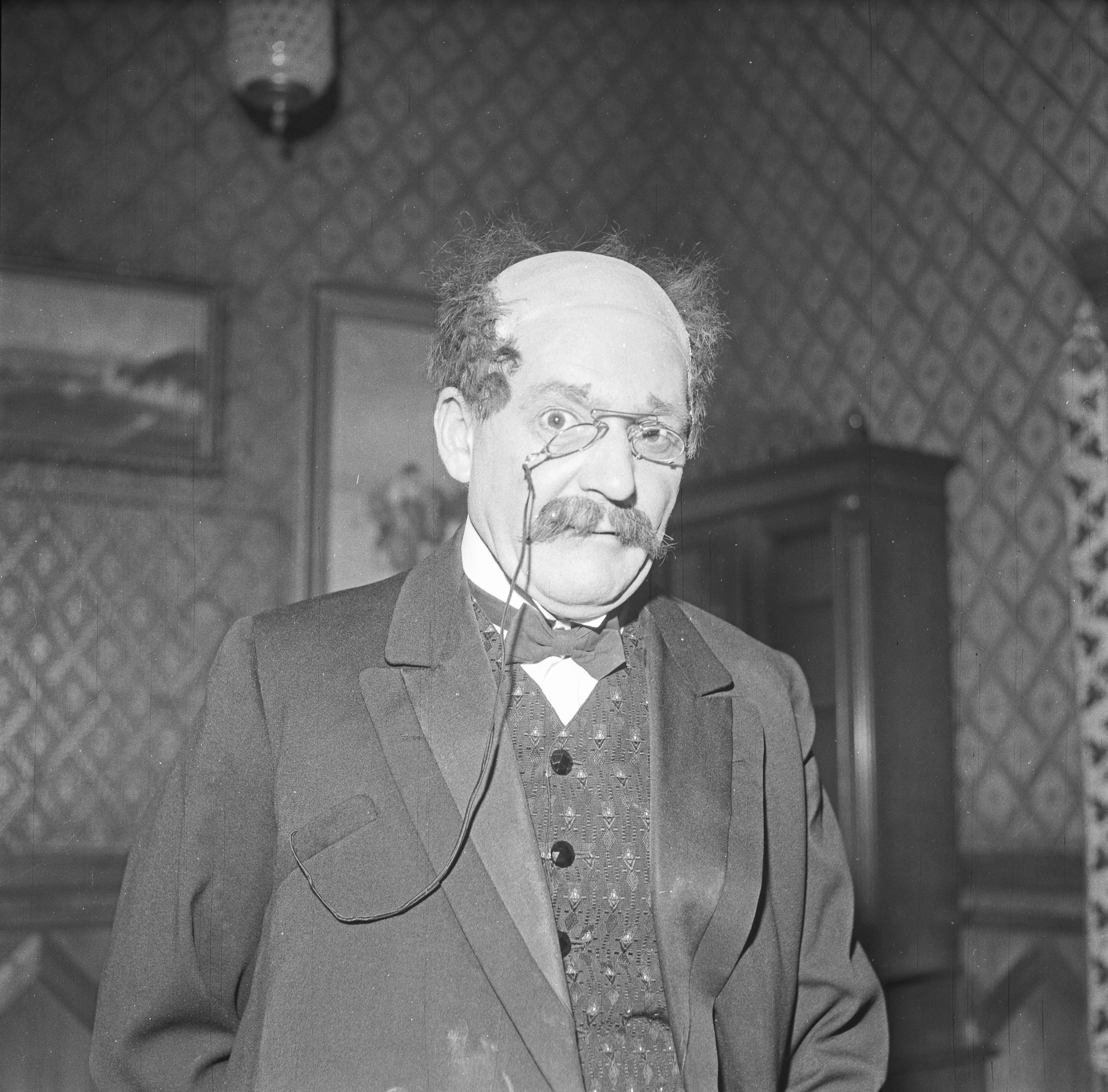
Lothar Lindtner in the play Geography and Love by Bjørnstjerne Bjørnson, ca. 1969.

Lindtner began his career as an 8-year-old where he got the role as the smallest Claus in Journey to the Christmas Star in 1925. After that he played in nearly 400 different productions. His big debut came in 1935, a year after finishing middle school, in the role of Anders in The Escape to China (Flukten til Kina) by Henny Skjønberg. Lindtner's breakthrough role was Henrik in The Political Tinker (Den politiske kandestøber) in 1941, which led to his permanent employment at Den Nationale Scene (DNS), where he remained for the majority of his professional life.

Through most of his career, he collaborated extensively with Rolf Berntzen, and the two became known as a duo on stage. He lived in Bergen all his life, with the exception of two periods in Trondheim (1946–1948 and 1979–1982) and in the period 1959–1961, when he was at the Edderkoppen Theatre in Oslo.

His most memorable television role is the imposing parish priest in the Fleksnes Fataliteter episode "Tryggere kan ingen være" from 1982. He was honored with the King's Medal of Merit in Gold in 1968 and was appointed a Knight of St. Olav in 1982. He had three children, one of which followed in his father's footsteps, actor Lasse Lindtner. He was a member of the Communist Party of Norway for years, and his son Per Lothar Lindtner served as leader of the party from 1993 to 2001.

Lothar Lindtner died in Bergen at the age of 87.
