= Hege Newth =

Norwegian writer (1966–2025)

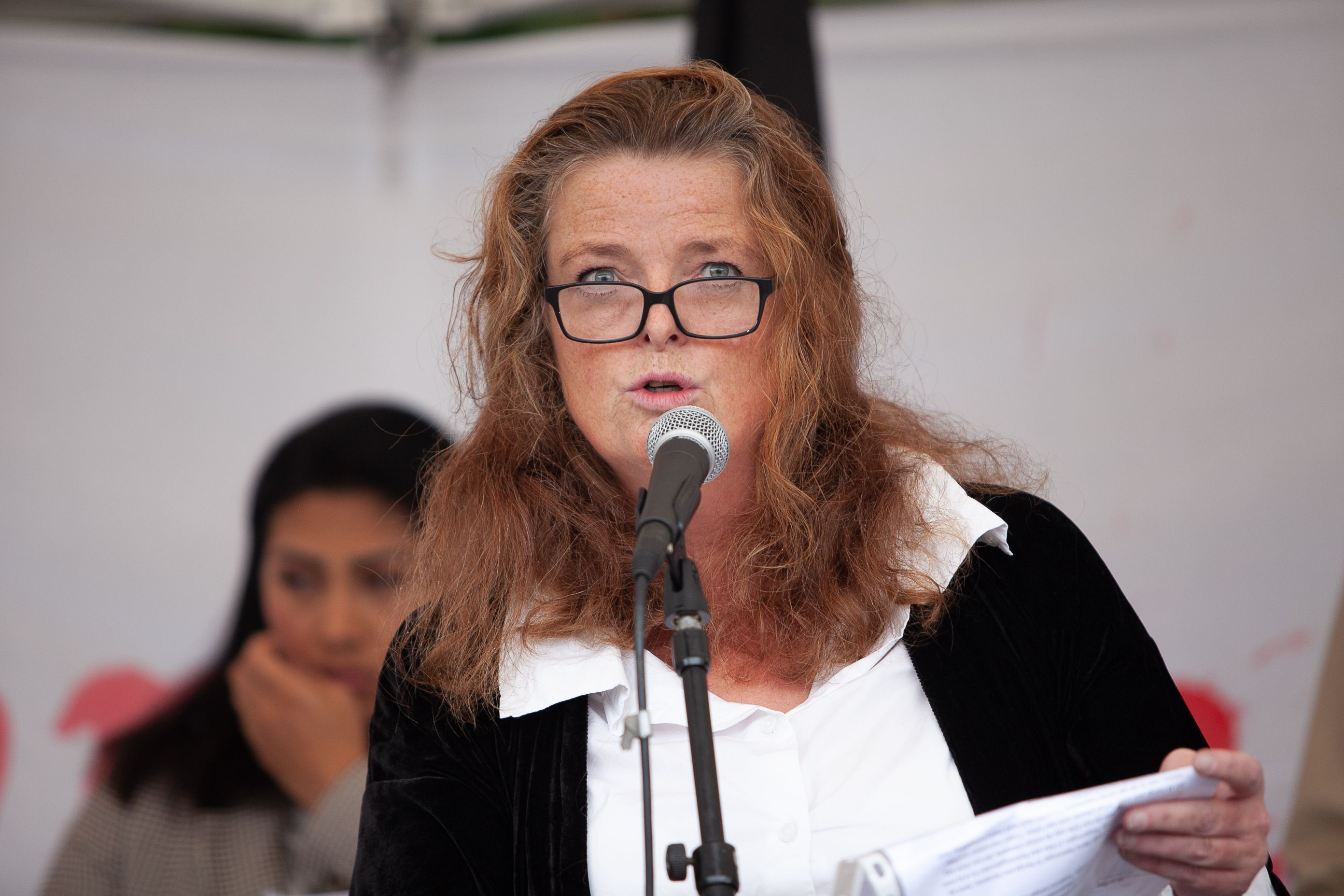
Hege Newth

Hege Newth (11 November 1966 – 30 November 2025) was a Norwegian writer.

== Life and career ==
Newth was born 11 November 1966 to Philip and Mette Newth, and the granddaughter of Fritjof and Lalli Knutsen. Her brother Eirik Newth is an astrophysicist.

She was educated in literature and writing and had a varied and extensive background as a writer, editor and project manager for various literary and freedom of expression-related projects. She worked for the Norwegian Forum for Freedom of Expression.

Newth also worked as the national coordinator for the Norwegian free cities of Norwegian PEN, general secretary of the Norwegian Library Association, and festival director of the Bjørnson Festival from 2005 to 2009.

Newth died of cancer on 30 November 2025, at the age of 59.
