= Waldemar Carlsen =

Norwegian novelist, newspaper editor and politician

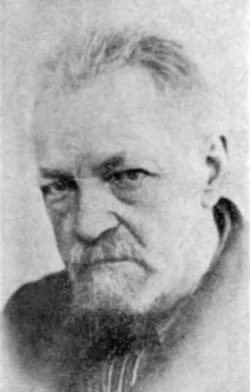
Waldemar Carlsen Portrait

Waldemar Carlsen (29 February 1880 – 28 August 1966) was a Norwegian novelist, newspaper editor and politician for the Labour and Communist parties.

== Biography ==
Carlsen was born in Kristiania, and moved to Solør at a young age. He was the editor-in-chief of the local labour newspaper Solungen from 1910 to 1913, and then applied for jobs in other newspapers, such as the editorship of Demokraten in June 1913. Although that bid failed, he edited Fremover from 1913 to 1916 and Glomdalens Arbeiderblad from 1916 to 1925. Glomdalens Arbeiderblad became affiliated with the Communist Party in 1923. Carlsen remained the editor until he quit his job in 1925 because he had stopped receiving wages. The newspaper was declared bankrupt in 1926 and disappeared in 1927.

== Political career ==
Carlsen unsuccessfully stood for parliamentary election as the deputy candidate of Fredrik Monsen in the constituency Hamar og Kongsvinger in 1918, then as a ballot candidate in the Market towns of Hedmark and Oppland counties in 1921 for Labour and 1924 for the Communists. He was a member of the executive committee of the municipal council for Kongsvinger Municipality. In the 1930s he was a travelling agitator, and founded many trade unions. He was also active in the temperance movement. In addition, Carlsen published several novels, such as Dragsug (1910), Orion (1911) and Jernnæven (1913), and the travelogue Herjetog i syd og nord (1919). He spent his last working years as a school janitor in Kongsvinger. He died in 1966.
