= Zafer Gözet =

Turkish-Norwegian Marxist-Leninist politician

Leader of the Communist Party of Norway
- In office 2001–2010
- Preceded by: Per Lothar Lindtner
- Succeeded by: Svend Haakon Jacobsen

Personal details
- Born: 21 September 1965 (age 59); Konya, Turkey
- Political party: Communist Party of Norway
- Occupation: Politician, teacher

Zafer Gözet (born 21 September 1965) is a Turkish-Norwegian Marxist-Leninist politician. He was the leader of the Communist Party of Norway (NKP) from 2001 to 2010.

Gözet was born and raised in Konya, Turkey before immigrating to Norway with his family in 1980.

After lengthy contact with the Communist Party throughout the 1980s, he decided at the beginning of the 1990s to join the party. He led the Buskerud and Vestfold division of the party from 2000 on, and in 2001 was elected party leader, the first immigrant to lead a political party in Norway.

Gözet was re-elected leader of the Communist Party at the party's 26th national congress in Alta in May 2007. From 1997 to 2002, he was also a member of Norway's Contact Committee for Immigrants and the Authorities. A teacher by profession, he is a board member of the Schools Association in Buskerud and a steward in Drammen Municipality, as well as leader of the joint schools association for Drammen and region.

Gözet led the Communist Party list of Buskerud candidates for the 2009 elections to the Parliament of Norway.
