= Gudbrandsdalens Arbeiderblad =

Norwegian newspaper

Gudbrandsdalens Arbeiderblad was a Norwegian newspaper published in Lillehammer in Hedmark county, Norway; from 1919 to 1923 it was named Gudbrandsdalens Social-Demokrat.

Gudbrandsdalens Social-Demokrat was started on 11 July 1919 as a Norwegian Labour Party newspaper. The first editor was Olaf Rossow.

In 1923 the Communist Party broke away from the Norwegian Labour Party; the paper followed the allegiance of the new party and the name was changed to Gudbrandsdalens Arbeiderblad on 31 March. Its last issue was published on 14 February 1924 when it was incorporated into Arbeideren under the new name Arbeideren og Gudbrandsdalens Arbeiderblad.
