= Solungen =

Norwegian newspaper

Solungen was a Norwegian newspaper, published in Åsnes Municipality in Innlandet county.

== History ==
Solungen was started in Flisa on 8 September 1904 by Evald Bosse (not to be confused with Ewald Bosse). As indicated by its name, it covered the district of Solør and had the subtitle Organ for Solørdistrikterne. It was an apolitical, or non-partisan, newspaper. When Bosse moved from Flisa in 1906, he wanted to sell it. His asking price was 13,000 kr, but J. M. Enger and August Embretsen from the local labour movement bargained the price down to 6,000 kr. The Norwegian Labour Party formally took over the newspaper on 1 January 1907. Embretsen became the first labour mayor of Åsnes Municipality in 1910. The newspaper faced problems in the local community, especially with lack of advertisements, but also when the landlord of their headquarters unilaterally stopped the tenancy in the summer of 1907. The newspaper was moved to Kjellmyra.

Solungen pretended to be an organ for the whole of Hedmark county, as the Labour Party had no other newspaper here. The local party representatives and the national board had agreed to it by September 1907. Outside of Solør it was published as Hedemarkens Amts Socialdemokrat (Solungen) from August 1908. People elsewhere in the county grew unsatisfied with this, and started Demokraten in September 1909, which covered the northern parts of the country, Hamar, Hedemarken, and Østerdalen.

The newspaper's chief editors were Evald Bosse from 1904 to 1906, then Cornelius Holmboe from 1907 to April 1908, Ola Solberg from April 1908 to April 1909, Ivar Færder from April 1909 to May 1910, Waldemar Carlsen from May 1910 to October 1913, Johs. Dahl from October 1913 to his death next month, then a committee until April 1914, then E. F. Lenning from April to July 1914 and finally Ole Ruud.

Solungen survived the local conservative newspaper, Solørposten which went defunct in June 1913. Solungen itself went defunct after its last issue on 31 December 1914. It was merged into Glommendalens Social-Demokrat from 1915. Many years later a new newspaper tried to launch itself as Avisen Solungen, but was persuaded (through a settlement) to use SolungAvisa for trademark reasons as the newspaper Glåmdalen, a successor of Glommendalens Social-Demokrat, as late as 29 February 2008 had applied to the Norwegian Industrial Property Office for the right of the name of the newspaper which it had absorbed in 1915.
