= Finnmark Fremtid =

Norwegian newspaper

Finnmark Fremtid (lit. 'Finnmark Future') was a Norwegian newspaper, published in Vardø in Finnmark county.

Finnmark Fremtid was started in January 1924 as the Communist Party organ in the county. The Communist Party, which was formed in 1923 after a split from the Labour Party, had first tried to get a hold of the existing Kirkenes newspaper Folkets Frihet, but it stayed with Labour.

The newspaper was published once a week; from mid-1924 twice a week. It did reasonably well, and unlike many other Communist newspapers it lasted until 1940. Because of the occupation of Norway by Nazi Germany the newspaper went defunct after its last issue on 5 August 1940.
