= Johannes Dahl =

Norwegian newspaper editor and politician

Johannes Dahl (died November 1913) was a Norwegian newspaper editor and politician for the Labour Party.

He was elected to the Kristiania city council in 1907. For the 1909 Norwegian parliamentary election, he was the party's top candidate in the constituency of Gamle Aker. He stood against Jens Bratlie, who won with 6,455 votes against Dahl's 4,400 votes; but Dahl did edge out the Liberal candidate. The first female representative in Parliament, Anna Rogstad, became Bratlie's deputy.

From October 1913 until his death in November 1913, Dahl was the editor-in-chief of Solungen. He died from a kidney problem.
