= Reidar T. Larsen =

Norwegian politician

Member of Parliament for Hedmark
- In office 1973–1977

Leader of the Communist Party of Norway
- In office 1965–1975
- Preceded by: Emil Løvlien
- Succeeded by: Martin Gunnar Knutsen

Member of Lillehammer City Council
- In office 1945–1947

Personal details
- Born: Reidar Thoralf Larsen; 8 October 1923 Lillehammer, Norway
- Died: 16 February 2012 (aged 88) Lillehammer, Norway
- Political party: Socialist Left Party (1975-1999); Communist Party of Norway (-1975)
- Occupation: Politician

Reidar Thoralf Larsen (8 October 1923 – 16 February 2012) was a Norwegian politician. He was chairman of the Communist Party of Norway from 1965 to 1975, when he resigned from his position, left the party and joined the Socialist Left Party (SV). He left SV in 1999 in protest against the party's support for the NATO bombing of Yugoslavia, and because he felt the party was not radical enough.

Larsen was a member of the Parliament of Norway from 1973 to 1977, representing Hedmark.

Party political offices
| Preceded by Emil Løvlien | Chairman of the Communist Party of Norway; 1965–1975 | Succeeded by Martin Gunnar Knutsen |
