= Akin Düzakin =

Turkish-Norwegian illustrator and children's author

Akin Düzakin (born 12 May 1961) is a Turkish-Norwegian illustrator and children's author.

Düzakin has illustrated a wide range of children's books, including books about Tvillingbror and Tvillingsøster of Liv Marie Austrem for which he received the Brage Prize in 1995 and 1997. He also won the Unni Sands bildebokpris award in 1998. Furthermore, in 2006 he won the Bokkunstprisen award.

Düzakin is known for acrylic paintings with poetic, naive motifs and clear shapes.

Awards
Preceded by Klaus Hagerup	Recipient of the Brage Prize for children and youth 1995 (with Liv Marie Austrem)	Succeeded by Eirik Newth
Preceded by Sven Kærup Bjørneboe	Recipient of the Brage Prize, open class 1997 (with Liv Marie Austrem)	Succeeded by Christian Rugstad
