= Buskerud-Arbeideren =

Norwegian newspaper

Buskerud-Arbeideren was a Norwegian newspaper, published in Buskerud county.

Buskerud-Arbeideren was started on 5 December 1923 as the Communist Party organ in the county. It was published daily. However, the party struggled economically and the newspaper went defunct after its last issue on 13 February 1925.
