= David Newth =

Prof David Richmond Newth FRSE PhD (1921-1988) was a British zoologist and scientific author.

== Life ==
He was born near Birmingham on 10 October 1921 the son of Herbert Greenway Newth and his wife Annie(Nan) Munroe Fraser, a Scot. He was educated at King Edward VI Aston School in Birmingham. He then studied Zoology at the University of London graduating BSc and gaining a postgraduate doctorate (PhD).

In the Second World War he served as a Lieutenant in the REME in India and Burma. In 1947 he began lecturing in Zoology at University College, London. In 1960 he became Professor of Biology as Applied to Medicine at Middlesex Hospital Medical School and in 1965 transferred to Scotland as Regius Professor of Zoology at Glasgow University.

He was elected a Fellow of the Royal Society of Edinburgh in 1966. His proposers were James Duncan Robertson, Sir Maurice Yonge, Percy Brian and John Paul.

He retired in 1981 and died at Lochgoilhead in western Scotland on 5 June 1988.

== Family ==
In 1946 he married Jean Winifred Haddon.

== Publications ==
- Animal Growth and Development (1970)
- Simple Nervous Systems (1975)
