= Young Communist League of Norway =

Youth league of Norges Kommunistiske Parti (NKP)

Young Communist League of Norway Norges Kommunistiske Ungdomsforbund
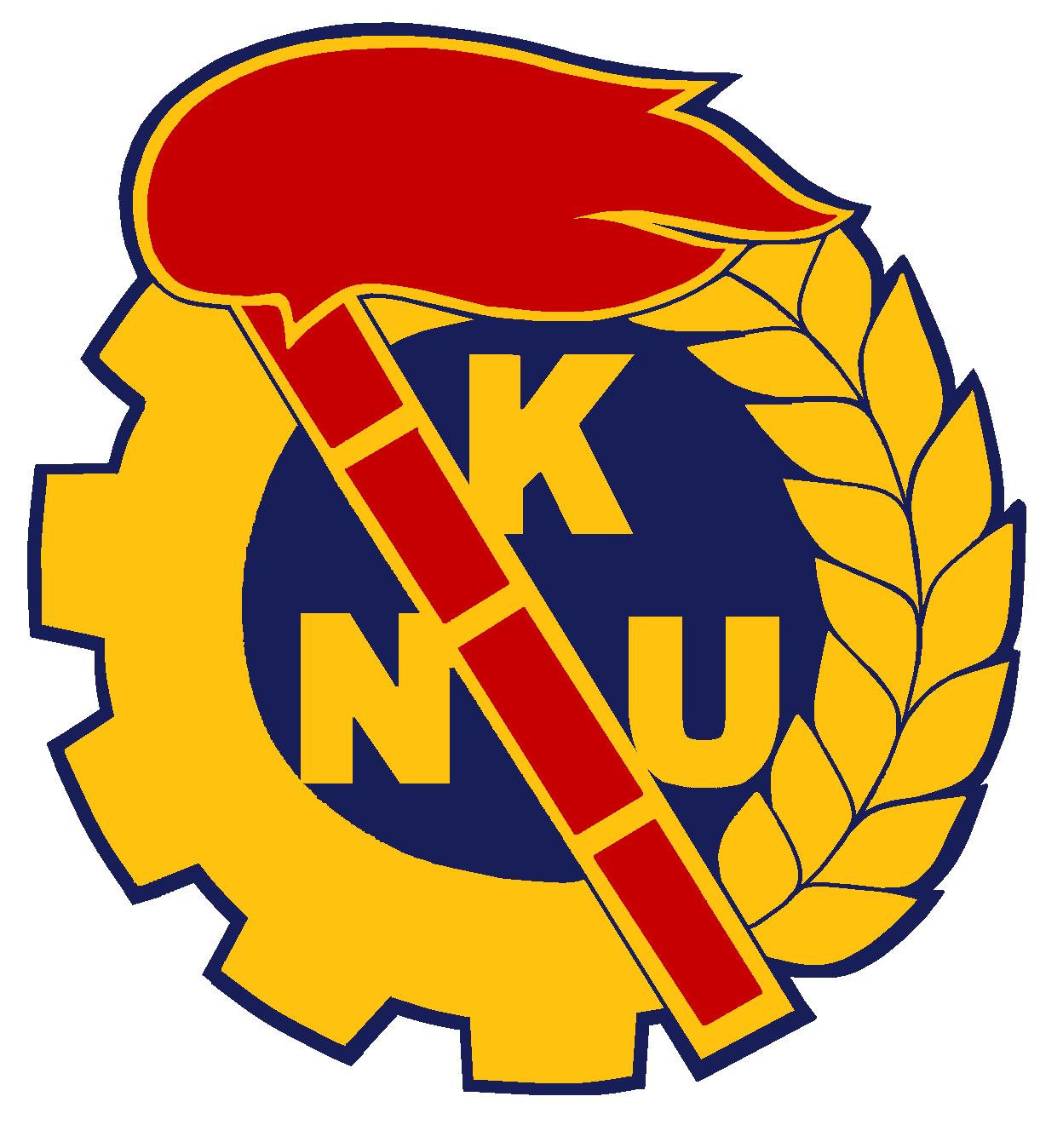
- Leader: Aleksander Skåre
- Founded: 1903
- Headquarters: Oslo
- Ideology: Communism; Marxism–Leninism
- Mother party: Communist Party of Norway (until 2006)
- International affiliation: WFDY
- Website: www.kommunisme.org

The Young Communist League of Norway (Norwegian: Norges Kommunistiske Ungdomsforbund, NKU) was until April 2006 the youth league of Norges Kommunistiske Parti (NKP).

The NKP declared on 1 April 2006 that the NKU was no longer its youth organization, and that all youths interested in joining the movement should contact the party directly. The NKU still persisted as an organization, however, and held a congress in the middle of May 2006, where it declared its wish to cooperate with the NKP, but also to continue on its own if necessary.

At the same time the NKP organized a conference of their own, where they established a new youth organization for the party, with the same name and logo as the original NKU. This has led to a conflict over the rights to the name, logo, history, international contacts and property of the NKU, which lasted until July 2008. The conflict ended in court, where both the NKU and NKP were found responsible for the problems that had arisen. However, it was decided that the NKU still had the right to their name and logo.

Therefore, the NKP's re-established version of the Youth League, which had taken up several new members since 2006 had to change its name from Young Communist League of Norway (Norges Kommunistiske Ungdomsforbund) to Youth Communists in Norway (Ungkommunistene i Norge) and also change their logo. UngKom took over for the NKU as the NKP's youth league and view themselves as an incarnation of the NKU.

After freezing the NKU's membership due to uncertainty over the situation in Norway, the World Federation of Democratic Youth decided to admit both communist youth organizations in February 2010.

== History ==
=== 1903–1940 ===
In 1903 in the city of Drammen as Young Social Democrats of Norway (NSU) as the youth wing of the Norwegian Labour Party. In 1923 they changed their mother party from the Labour Party to the newly formed communist party, which was formed following a conflict on the membership in Komintern.

In the 1930s, the youth league worked together with the communist party against strikebreakers, fascism and for the establishing of a national front to defend the country against fascism and nazism.

=== 1940–1949 ===
When World War II came to Norway 9 April 1940, the youth communists prepared its organization for illegal work in case the Nazi occupation lead to communist organizations being illegalized. This happened in August the same year, a month before the illegalization of the other political parties. In addition to the communists being the fascists' and Nazis' main enemy, this happened because the communists were the only ones who refused to print Quisling's statement of 10 April. By 16 April, communists urged armed resistance, while the other parties urged calm behavior. Following the illegalization, the youth league's resistance sharpened with the creation of some of Norway's first illegal papers during the war When the Molotov–Ribbentrop Pact of 1939 was violated, the Youth Communists intensified their activities further. In the period 1941–1945 the Youth League was part of numerous sabotage-raids against Germans and German-aiding production, several of their members also contributed directly in the war effort. One example of this is Dagny Siblund from Jacobsnes in Finnmark, northern Norway, who fled to the Soviet Union and received training there before being dropped in a parachute over Norway as Norway's first female parachuter. When the war came to an end and the occupation was lifted, the organization had gained so much popularity that several of the Labour Party's Youth Wing leagues joined the communist league instead. In the next few years the youth league would disagree so much with the communist party that it resulted in an open political conflict within both organizations between the so-called Furubotn-fløy and the Løvlien-fløy.

=== 1949–present ===
The youth league became less prominent in Norwegian politics as the communist party lost its seats in the Storting. In 1967 a right-wing faction in the youth league was excluded from the communist party, but the faction had majority control over the central part of the communist youth league resulting in the youth league suspending to be the youth league of the communist party. In response to this the communist party established a new youth league called Communist Youth (KU) which took the NKU's seat for a couple of years until the NKU died out and they could reclaim the name and logo of the organization. The NKU again became the youth wing of the communist party.
