= Johannes Stubberud =

Norwegian newspaper editor (1891–1942)

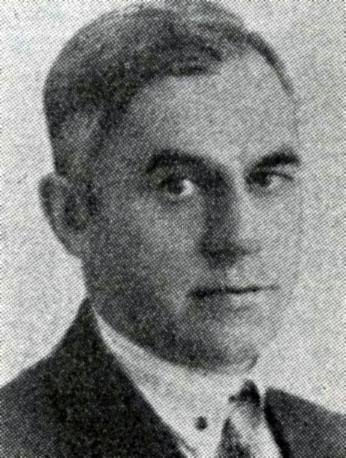
- Stubberud circa 1930
- Born: 27 February 1891; Østre Toten, Norway
- Died: 4 March 1942 (aged 51); Oranienburg, Germany
- Occupation: Newspaper editor

Johannes Stubberud (27 February 1891 – 4 March 1942) was a Norwegian newspaper editor who was imprisoned and killed during the occupation of Norway by Nazi Germany.

He was born in Østre Toten Municipality, Norway, as the son of Hans Petter Stubberud and his wife Klara, née Johannesen. He married Solveig Karoline Treider in 1916, and had two children. The family settled in Halden.

Stubberud was a saddle maker by education, but worked in newspapers. He was acting editor of Østerdalens Arbeiderblad from early 1922 to early 1923. He was the editor-in-chief of Haldens Arbeiderblad at the outbreak of World War II. A few months into the German occupation of Norway, the newspaper was closed by the Nazi authorities. Stubberud, having also assisted people who fled the country across the Swedish border, was arrested in April 1941 due to his opposition to the Nazi press policy. He was imprisoned at Møllergata 19 and Grini before being sent to Germany in September 1941. He died at Sachsenhausen in March 1942.
