= Charles Mackenzie Bruff =

Norwegian chemist (1887–1955)

- Born: 15 January 1887; Christiania, Norway
- Died: 17 October 1955 (aged 68)
- Education: Chalmers University of Technology
- Occupation: Forensic chemist

Charles Mackenzie Bruff (15 January 1887 – 17 October 1955) was a Norwegian chemist.

He was born in Christiania (now Oslo), Norway. He was educated at Chalmers University of Technology in Gothenburg. He was a teacher in chemistry at Oslo Handelsgymnasium from 1915 to 1947. He was a specialist in forensic chemistry, officially authorized as a forensic chemist in 1921 by the Ministry of Justice and Public Security. He contributed to about 15,000 crime cases during his career. He published his autobiography De tause vitner (1949).

== Selected works ==
- Bruff, Charles Mackenzie; Georg Svendsen; Fridtjof Knutsen (1949). De tause vitner. Av rettskjemiker Ch. B.s memoarer.
