= Fritt Folk (Communist) =

Norwegian newspaper

Fritt Folk (lit. 'Free People') was a Norwegian newspaper, published in Høyanger in Sogn og Fjordane county from 1919 until 1928.

== History and profile ==
The paper was started as Sogns Social-Demokrat in 1919, as the first Labour Party newspaper in Sogn og Fjordane. It was published in Lærdalsøyri, and Erik Nordberg was the editor-in-chief. In 1920 Kr. Bøthun took over as editor, was soon (September) succeeded by Kristian Modahl, and the newspaper began publishing twice a week. In 1921 it was moved from Lærdalsøyri to Vadheim, and the name was changed to Sogn og Fjordane Socialdemokrat. Its tagline was "Organ for Sogn og Fjordane arbeiderparti".

In 1923, when the Communist Party split from the Labour Party, the newspaper was usurped by the new party. The name was changed to Fritt Folk in 1923, and moved to Høyanger in 1924. Kristian Modahl remained editor. It was published twice a week. The newspaper went defunct after its last issue on 4 April 1928. This was partly caused by the antagonism between local Communist and Labour members, also the newspaper was evicted from its headquarters in the basement of Folkets Hus (The People's House), whose owners had become indebted.
