= Henrik Steffens =

Norwegian philosopher, theologian, scientist and poet

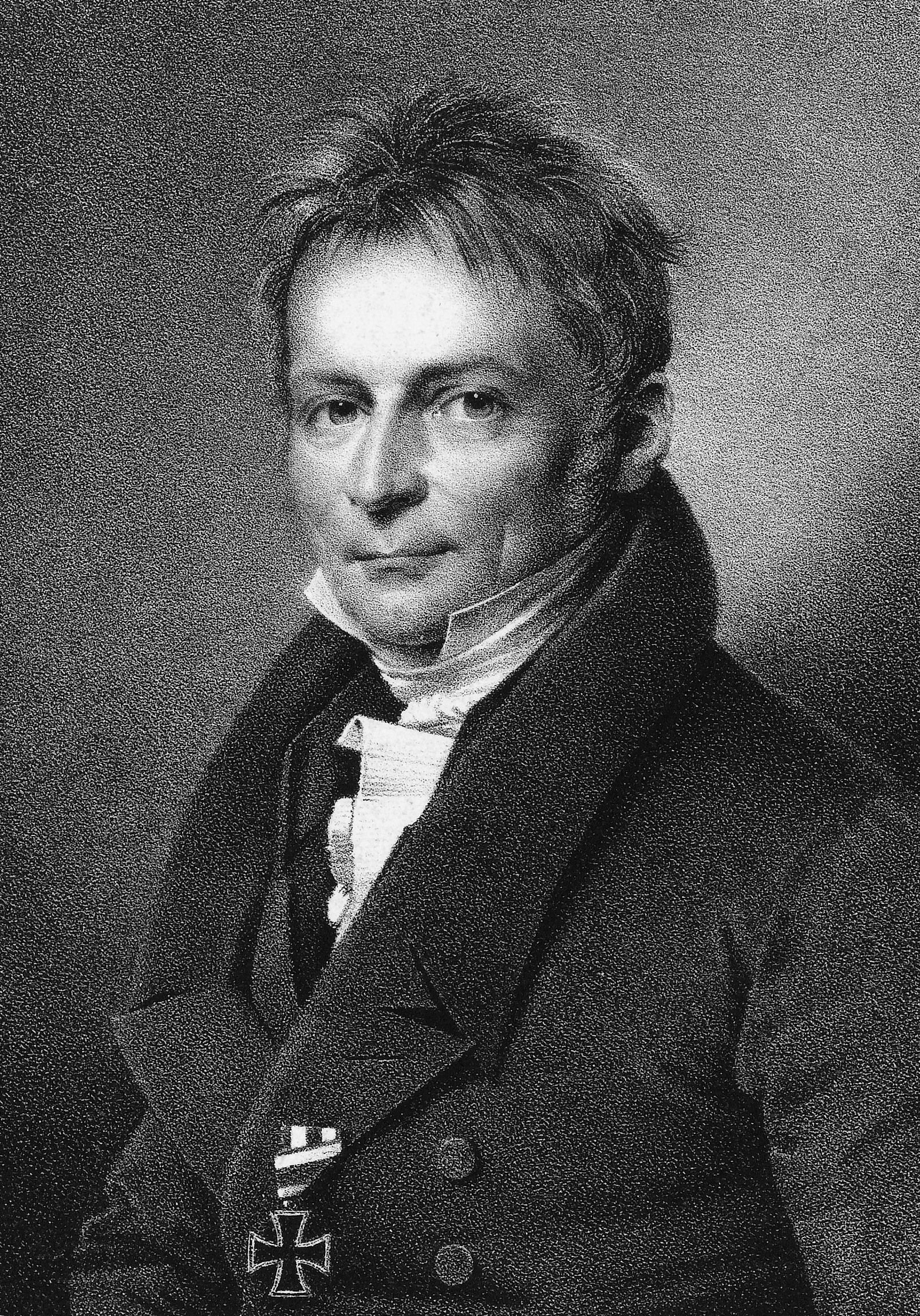
- Lithograph of Steffens by Franz Krüger, 1828
- Born: 2 May 1773; Stavanger, Denmark-Norway
- Died: 13 February 1845 (aged 71); Berlin, Province of Brandenburg, Kingdom of Prussia, German Confederation
- Scientific career
- Fields: Philosophy, Geology, Mineralogy

Henrik Steffens (2 May 1773 – 13 February 1845), was a Norwegian philosopher, scientist, and poet.

== Early life, education, and lectures ==
He was born at Stavanger. At the age of fourteen he went with his parents to Copenhagen, where he studied theology and natural science. In 1796 he lectured at the University of Kiel, and two years later went to the University of Jena to study the natural philosophy of Friedrich Schelling. He went to Freiberg in 1800, and there came under the influence of Abraham Gottlob Werner. In 1801, he published a volume on geology called Beiträge zur inneren Naturgeschichte der Erde. (Contributions to the inner natural history of the Earth) which became his most successful and influential work as a scientist. He there defended a Neptunist theory of the origin of the Earth against the Vulcanist theory later to be defended by his fellow student in Freiberg, Alexander von Humboldt.

After two years he returned to Copenhagen, and is said to have introduced German romanticism to Denmark in 1802 with nine lectures given at Elers Kollegium, later published as Indledning til philosophiske Forelæsninger (Introduction to Philosophical Lectures). These lectures were a great success and a source of inspiration in Danish romanticism. They were attended by many who later became leading Danish thinkers, such as Oehlenschläger and Grundtvig. Friedrich Schleiermacher was so much struck by their excellence that he endeavoured, unsuccessfully, to obtain for Steffens a chair in the new Berlin University in 1804, in order that his own ethical teachings should be supported in the scientific department.

== Professorship and theories ==
Despite – or perhaps because of – the deep impact made by his lectures, Steffens was not made welcome by the Danish authorities. He moved back to Germany and took up a professorship at the University of Halle in 1804, to return to Denmark only occasionally. During the Battle of Leipzig (1813) he enlisted in the Prussian Army as a second lieutenant, and he was present at the capture of Paris the following year. He was professor of physics at Breslau from 1811 until 1832, when he accepted an invitation to Berlin.

Steffens was one of the so-called "Philosophers of Nature", a friend and adherent of Schelling and of Schleiermacher. More than either of these two thinkers he was acquainted with the discoveries of modern science, and was thus able to correct or modify the highly imaginative speculations of Schelling. He held that, throughout the scheme of nature and intellectual life, the main principle is Individualisation. As organisms rise higher in the scale of development, the sharper and more distinct become their outlines, the more definite their individualities. This principle he endeavoured to deduce from his knowledge of geology, in contrast to Lorenz Oken, who developed the same theory on biological grounds. His influence was considerable, and both Schelling and Schleiermacher modified their theories in deference to his scientific deductions.

His chief scientific and philosophical works are:

- Beiträge zur inneren Naturgeschichte der Erde (1801)
- Grundzuge der philosophischen Naturwissenschaft (1806)
- Anthropologie (1824)
- Ueber die idee der Universitäten (1835)
- Ueber geheime Verbindungen auf Universitaten (1835)
- Karikaturen des Heiligsten (1819–1821)
- Wie ich wieder Lutheraner wurde und was mir das Luthertum ist (1831)
- Von tIer falschen Theolegie und dem wahren Glauben (new ed., 1831)
- Die Familien Walseth and Leith (1827)
- Die vier Norweger (1828)
- Malcolm (1831)

During the last five years of his life he wrote an autobiography, Was ich erlebte, and after his death his Nachgelassene Schriften (1846) was published. See Tietzen, Zur Erinnerung an Steffens; Petersen, Henrik Steffens (German translation, 1884); Dilthey, Leben Schleiermachers.

== Legacy ==
Henrik Steffens has been an influential figure in the Scandinavian history of Romanticism and was a towering figure in the effort to combine the emerging natural sciences with new Romantic ideas about nature. These were to a certain extent neglected in the 20th century as more positivism and naturalism dominated within the natural sciences. However, with the emergence of the Anthropocene, Steffens' ideas have been rediscovered as a source of inspiration for interdisciplinary perspectives on ecology and the earth sciences.

The Henrik Steffens Professor, a named chair at the Humboldt University of Berlin in the field of humanities and social sciences, is funded by the Government of Norway and administered jointly by the Humboldt University and the University of Oslo. The professorship was established in connection with the state visit of German President Roman Herzog in Norway in 1998, on the initiative of Lucy Smith, the Rector of the University of Oslo. The purpose of the professorship is to promote academic cooperation between Norway and Germany in the fields of humanities and social sciences, "in the spirit of Henrik Steffens." It is one of the nine named chairs at the Humboldt University.

The professorship is hosted by the Department of Northern European Studies at the Humboldt University, which is located near Unter den Linden. The department also hosts the Dag Hammarskjöld Professorship, which is funded by the Swedish government.

=== List of Henrik Steffens Professors ===
- Einhart Lorenz 1998–2001
- Jan Brockmann 2001–2004
- Helge Høibraaten 2004–2009
- Jorunn Sem Fure 2009–2011
- Kjetil Jakobsen 2011–2014
- Janke Klok 2014–
