= Theodor Aaset =

Norwegian politician

Deputy representative to the Parliament of Norway
- In office 1913–1915

Personal details
- Born: 3 July 1862 Aaset, Grue, Norway
- Died: 29 July 1954 (aged 92)
- Party: Labour Party

Theodor Olsen Aaset (3 July 1862 – 29 July 1954) was a Norwegian politician for the Labour Party.

He was born at Aaset in Grue Municipality as a forester's son. He worked as a carpenter and smallholder in Grue. In 1904 he was elected to the executive committee of Grue municipal council, and during the term 1913–1915 he served as a deputy representative to the Parliament of Norway from the constituency Solør. When regular representative August Embretsen died in late 1914, Aaset took his seat in Parliament.
