= Kråkerøy speech =

1948 speech delivered by Einar Gerhardsen

The Kråkerøy speech, also known as the Fredrikstad speech, is the name of a speech given by Norwegian Prime Minister Einar Gerhardsen on February 29, 1948, at the Folkvang Assembly Hall on Kråkerøy Island near Fredrikstad. In the speech, he condemned the Norwegian Communist Party. He also strongly criticized Norwegian Communists, and announced the final break between the Norwegian Labour Party and Norwegian Communist Party.

The speech attracted great attention at the time, both in Norway and abroad. It has since become a part of Norwegian political history, signaling the end of communism as a force in Norwegian politics, as well as the beginning of a purge of communists and leftist radicals within the Labour Party. The speech has been coined "A declaration of war on Norwegian communists".

== Background ==
The background for the speech was the communist coup in Czechoslovakia on 25 February, just four days prior, as well as the Soviet Union's offer to Finland of a non-aggression pact on 27 February. At the time of the coup, Czechoslovakia was preparing a highly anticipated parliamentary election, which was due that very spring. Both the coup itself and the timing was a source of widespread concern within the Norwegian government, who were at the time uncertain as to how it would affect Norway.

Furthermore, the Moscow-aligned Norwegian Communist Party (NKP) and its leader Peder Furubotn had publicly voiced support for the Soviet Union and accepted its version of events. This had caused fear throughout the population that a similar coup and subsequent Soviet invasion could happen in Norway. Prime Minister Gerhardsen had until then followed a conciliatory line towards both the Communist party as well as hard-line leftists in his own party. However, after the coup events he joined with the anti-communist Party-Secretary Haakon Lie in purging the Party.

== Excerpts ==
The Czechoslovak people stands before us as a freedom-loving people, who have fought bravely against invaders and oppressors of all kinds. We have felt a remarkable kinship with these people, sympathized with them and revered them. That's why it pains us so deeply to witness what is happening now. The communists are surely the only ones who are excited. They say that it is the popular will and the people who have triumphed. The rest of us have a hard time understanding how it could be necessary to completely disregard the parliament that the Czech people have elected. And we have a hard time understanding that the communists were not able to await the results of the elections that would have taken place in a few months. Under these circumstances, we must accept that there is no more than one reasonable explanation, namely that the Communists did not dare leave the decision to the people in free elections.

Events in Czechoslovakia have with most Norwegians not only aroused sadness and anger - but also anxiety and a feeling of discomfort. The problem for Norway, as far as I can see, is primarily a domestic problem. There is a threat to the Norwegian people's freedom and democracy - that is the danger that the Norwegian Communist Party forever represents. The most important task in the fight for Norway's independence, for democracy and the rule of law is to reduce Communist Party and Communist influence as much as possible.

We must not create a witch hunt against them. We will not fight them with the same methods as their Czech comrades fight their political opponents. The Norwegian communists will still be able to enjoy all democratic rights. They will be able to speak and write freely. No action committees from other parties will carry out purges of their editors, or among their officers. Their representatives in parliament and local government will be able to continue their work there until the voters in free elections replace them with others. And they will continue their efforts to win positions in the trade unions and use their influence to take action which disturbs our economy. We will fight against communism with democratic means and spiritual weapons.

We will try to convince the many that joined them during the war, in good faith, because they believed the Communist Party was national and democratic. Today, nobody is permitted to have that good faith. Those who stand at the head of the Communist Party of Norway are Comintern and Cominform communists. Like their comrades in other countries, in their hearts they are supporters of terror and dictatorship. Beautiful declamations can no longer prevent people from seeing the brutal truth with open eyes - even if for many it will be a grim discovery. The only ones who can prove that this strong judgment is incorrect are the Norwegian Communists themselves. They can do this by clearly rejecting the procedure their Czech comrades have used, and by openly breaking with the international communist organizations. But this, Peder Furubotn's party will never do. Those members of the Communist Party who wish to put Norway ahead of other countries, and freedom and democracy before other ideals, must break with the Communist Party. Because I believe that the current problem is a domestic problem, I think one has the right to say that for the moment there is no danger for Norway. I say that in the confidence that the free Norwegian people will themselves reduce the Communist Party to the insignificant sect that it was before the war. And with it, the danger of Czechoslovak conditions in Norway will be reduced accordingly. We shall see the seriousness of the situation with open eyes, but there is no reason to paint too dark a picture either.

At a time like this, there lies a great responsibility on all political parties and their representatives, on all organizations and the press. If one should ever have the right to demand fairness and decency in public debate, it should be in a time like the one we are living through now.

== Aftermath ==
Due to the events in Czechoslovakia, Norway became one of the original members of NATO when it was established the following year. In 1950 the Kråkerøy Speech's main principles became law in the form of "The Emergency laws" (Norwegian: Beredsskapslovene).

The speech was also the prelude to a major political shift which saw a wave of legal and illegal anti-communist measures, peaking in the 1960s, including party exclusions, censorship of far-left media and introduction of the most comprehensive monitoring of communist and left-wing radicals in the post-war era, as documented by the report of the Lund Commission, amongst others.

A group of leftists who had been excluded in 1961 formed a new political party, the Socialist People's Party, which that same year had 2 MPs elected to Parliament. This tipped the balance enough for the Labour party to lose the absolute majority it had enjoyed since the end of World War II.

In 1982, thirty-four years after the original speech, Gerhardsen returned to the same assembly hall in Kråkerøy. At the event he replicated sections of the speech and commented on his thoughts behind it.
