= Martin Gunnar Knutsen =

Norwegian politician (1918–2001)

Chairman of the Communist Party of Norway
- In office 1975–1982
- Preceded by: Reidar T. Larsen
- Succeeded by: Hans I. Kleven

Personal details
- Born: 29 September 1918 Skien, Telemark, Norway
- Died: 23 February 2001 (aged 82)
- Awards: Order of Friendship of Peoples

Martin Gunnar Knutsen (29 September 1918 – 23 February 2001) was a Norwegian politician, chairman of the Communist Party of Norway (NKP) 1975–1982.

Knutsen was born in Skien. He was active in the resistance during the German occupation of Norway. While being a teaching student he published the clandestine bulletin Fritt fram (Norwegian for "Freely forward"). Knutsen, along with a group of colleagues, was arrested in 1944 and Fritt fram ceased publication. He edited the newspaper Vardø Framtid from 1949 to 1950.

During the 1950s he stayed in Moscow, and worked as a newsreader for the Norwegian-language broadcasts of Radio Moscow. On 5 March 1953 he was the first to read out the news of the death of Joseph Stalin to a Norwegian audience.

Knutsen headed the orthodox group inside NKP, which resisted the moves by the party chairman Reidar T. Larsen to merge the party into the Socialist Electoral League (SV). Knutsen replaced Larsen as party chairman in 1975, and pulled the party out of SV. After the rupture with SV the marginalization of NKP continued. Knutsen had been a deputy member of the Parliament of Norway during the term 1973–1977, and met during 2 days of parliamentary session. He headed the NKP candidate slate in Akershus in the 1977 legislative election, but was not elected, as the party obtained only 0.4% of the votes nationwide. Knutsen was also a member of the executive committee of Skedsmo municipal council from 1971 to 1975.

Knutsen was a recipient of the Soviet Order of Friendship of Peoples. He stepped down from the NKP chairmanship in 1982. Knutsen left NKP in September 1990, after five decades of membership in the party.

He met his wife Nina in 1977, a translator and teacher from Zlatoust. He died in 2001.

Party political offices
| Preceded by Reidar T. Larsen | Chairman of the Communist Party of Norway; 1975–1982 | Succeeded by Hans I. Kleven |
