= Young Communists in Norway =

Youth wing of the Norwegian Communist Party

Young Communists in Norway UngKommunistene i Norge
- Leader: Jørgen Hovde
- Deputy Leader: Are Ormberg
- Founded: 2006
- Preceded by: Young Communist League
- Headquarters: Helgesensgate 21, Oslo
- Membership: 40–50 (2009)
- Ideology: Communism; Marxism–Leninism
- Mother party: Communist Party of Norway
- Website: Official Website

The Young Communists in Norway (UngKom) is the youth wing of the Norwegian Communist Party. The Youth Communists in Norway is a Marxist-Leninist organization. The UngKom prints and hands out the communist paper Kameraten ('The Comrade'). The organization was formed after a conflict between the leaders of the Young Communist League of Norway (NKU) and the Norwegian Communist Party resulting that a few former members of NKU as well as some newcomers forming a new communist youth, with the same name as NKU, organization together with the communist party. In 2008 the new NKU was forced by the Oslo District Court to change its name and logo and therefore the organization became The Youth Communists in Norway.

== 2006—Present Day ==
In 2006 the communist party felt that the leading members of the youth league had failed miserably. The national meeting of NKU had not been held within required limits of their own written rules, possible members met no answer when trying to establish contact with the youth league and mail, including bills, were not opened. To which lengths this claims can be verified is uncertain, but with these arguments the communist party re-established NKU in April–May 2006 together with the potential members and some former members of the youth league. In this process they called a national meeting for those wishing to re-establish the youth league, a meeting which was held on the 12 and 13 May. This resulted in a new more bitter conflict between the old youth league and the communist party, whilst the new youth league itself remained out of the conflict able to begin its work as a youth league.

In 2007 the old youth league summoned NKP to court for theft of a political party. Although the NKP was not found guilty of stealing an organization, the court decided that the old youth league had the right to the name and logo of the Young Communist League of Norway. NKP was however commended for making steps toward re-organizing the youth league, but the court pointed out that they should have involved the leadership of the old youth league as well. As a consequence the new youth wing of the communist party had to change their name into The Youth Communists in Norway.

== Organization ==
Today, The Youth Communists in Norway is organized after the principles of democratic centralism with one exception, there is an extra organ on top of the organization which consists of both local leaders of the league as well as some prominent members from the communist party. The organization claims this is a part of the process of re-establishing the communist youth movement. The youth league has presently have offices in these cities:

- Oslo
- Bergen
- Trondheim
- Tromsø
- Drammen
