= Follo Arbeiderblad =

Norwegian newspaper

Follo Arbeiderblad was a Norwegian newspaper, published in Ski in Akershus county.

Follo Arbeiderblad was from 1923 as the Communist Party organ in the region Follo. It was issued twice a week. From January 1924 it got a new name, Akershus Folkeblad, tried to cover Akershus and was published three times a week. It soon returned to two times a week, and went defunct altogether after its last issue on 23 July 1924.
