= Fridtjof Knutsen =

Norwegian journalist and crime novelist

Fridtjof Knutsen (15 December 1894 – 4 August 1961) was a Norwegian journalist and crime novelist.

He was born in Harstad, and was married to Lalli Knutsen. Their daughter Mette Knutsen married Philip Newth and had the son Eirik Newth, and daughter Hege Newth.

Knutsen was a journalist in Dagsposten from 1914, Morgenposten from, Tidens Tegn from 1917 and Aftenposten from 1934. He specifically reported from court cases. Some years after his death he was also called one of "the three great criminal and police reporters in Oslo", together with Georg Svendsen and Axel Kielland.

Knutsen also wrote about 30 criminal novels, many together with his wife. Many were Norwegian adaptations of books originally written by Betty Cavanna, Berkeley Gray (Edwy Searles Brooks), Carolyn Keene (several people), Helen Louise Thorndyke (several people), and Clair Blank. Knutsen also wrote about 30 revues under the pseudonym Filius Kanuti. Non-fiction books include De tause vitner: av rettskjemiker Ch. Bruffs memoarer (1949, with Georg Svendsen).
