= Liv Marie Austrem =

Norwegian author

Liv Marie Austrem (born 30 January 1947) is a Norwegian novelist, children's writer and non-fiction writer.

Among her children's books are Runar vart 17 år from 1988 and Monas historie from 1993. She was awarded the Brage Prize in 1995 for Tvillingbror, shared with illustrator Akin Düzakin. In 1997 she received the Brage Prize for Tvillingsøster.

Among her novels are Gyda from 1995, and Rikkes reise from 1997.

Awards
Preceded by Klaus Hagerup	Recipient of the Brage Prize (children's literature); 1995 (with Akin Düzakin)	Succeeded by Eirik Newth
Preceded by Sven Kærup Bjørneboe	Recipient of the Brage Prize (open class); 1997 (with Akin Düzakin)	Succeeded by Christian Rugstad
