= Sven Kærup Bjørneboe =

Norwegian essayist

- Born: 11 June 1943 (age 82); Kristiansand, Norway
- Occupation: essayist
- Awards: Brage Prize

Sven Kærup Bjørneboe (born 11 June 1943) is a Norwegian essayist. He was born in Kristiansand, and is a nephew of writer Jens Bjørneboe.

His first essay collection was Brud og Brudgom from 1967. Among his other collections are I tvillingens tegn from 1970, Flukten til det virkelige from 1984, Om opprør og opprørsånd from 1989, and Oss svermere imellom from 1993. He was awarded the Brage Prize in 1996 for the essay Jerusalem. En sentimental reise.

Awards
Preceded by first recipient	Recipient of the Brage Prize (open class); 1996	Succeeded by Liv Marie Austrem; Akin Düzakin
