= Georg Svendsen =

Norwegian journalist and crime novelist

Georg "Mr. George" Svendsen (19 March 1894 – 1966) was a Norwegian journalist and crime novelist.

He was born in Eidanger Municipality, and started his journalistic career in Bratsberg-Demokraten before moving on to Demokraten where he was a subeditor. In 1921 he was hired in Fremtiden and replaced in Demokraten by Evald O. Solbakken. In 1931 he was hired in Arbeiderbladet. Under the pen name "Mr. George" he became known for his humorous articles in the newspaper. At his death he was also called "the last of the three great criminal and police reporters in Oslo", together with Fridtjof Knutsen and Axel Kielland. He was also known for practising journalism as a trade in itself, and not as a part of a political career. He retired in 1964, and died in 1966.

He released the criminal novels Mannen med ljåen (1942), Ridderne av øksen (1945) and Den hvite streken (1946), and translated the book S.S. Murder by Quentin Patrick as Mord ombord in 1945. He released several historical books: Rørleggernes Fagforenings historie gjennem 50 år (1934), Telefonmontørenes Forening Oslo, gjennem 50 år (1939), Norsk nærings- og nydelsesmiddelarbeiderforbund: 25-års beretning (1948), De tause vitner: av rettskjemiker Ch. Bruffs memoarer (1949, with Fridtjof Knudsen) and Elektriske montørers fagforening gjennom 50 år (1949).
