= James Duncan Robertson =

Scottish zoologist

James Duncan Robertson FRSE FIB FZS (16 January 1912 – 22 December 1993) was a 20th-century Scottish zoologist.

== Life ==
He was born in Glasgow on 16 January 1912 the eldest of four children of James Robertson, a local headmaster of Shetland descent, and his wife Phemie Helen Hunter Muir, a schoolteacher. He was educated at Rutherglen Academy and was school dux in 1929.

He studied zoology at Glasgow University under Prof John Graham Kerr graduating BSc in 1933. He was a Robert Donaldson Scholar 1933 to 1935 during which period he befriended Alexander Haddow, Douglas Bertram and Russell Lumsden. He then went to Cambridge University with a Carnegie Scholarship for postgraduate studies gaining a doctorate (PhD) in 1936. In 1938 he returned to Glasgow as assistant to Prof Edward Hindle.

In the Second World War he saw active service in the RAMC, serving as a Captain in West Africa, Italy and India.

Returning to Glasgow University in 1946 he began lecturing in zoology. After several promotions he became Professor in 1964.

In 1952 he was elected a Fellow of the Royal Society of Edinburgh. His proposers were Sir Maurice Yonge, Otto Lowenstein, Ebenezer Ford, Sheina Marshall and Andrew Picken Orr. He served as Vice President of the Society from 1967 to 1969.

He retired in 1982 and died whilst Christmas shopping in Glasgow on 22 December 1993 aged 81.

== Family ==
In 1947 he married Isobel Mary (Elma) Lamont Leitch (d.1986).

They had two daughters, Ailsa and Norna Robertson.
