= Philip Newth =

Anglo-Norwegian author of children's literature

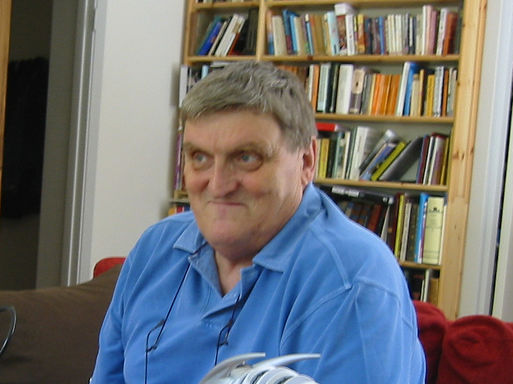
- Born: 20 January 1939 (age 87); Worcester, England
- Occupation: children's writer
- Spouse: Mette Newth
- Children: Eirik Newth
- Awards: Norwegian Critics Prize for Best children's book (1985)

Philip Newth (born 20 January 1939) is an Anglo-Norwegian author of children's literature. He has written more than fifty books, including books for deaf and blind children.

== Personal life ==
Newth was born in Worcester, England, as the son of actor William Newth and actress Constance Tayler. He is married to illustrator and writer Mette Newth, and was thus a son-in-law of Fridtjof and Lalli Knutsen. The couple settled at Rykkinn in Bærum, and had the children Eirik Newth, Hege & Torstein.

== Career ==
Newth made his literary debut in 1970 with the children's book Den aller største kanonen, and has later written more than fifty books. His books Beany, Fatto, Ludo og jeg from 1979, Røtter i Kastanjegata from 1980, and Opp mot veggen from 1991 depict life from the English working class around 1950. Among his books for blind are Rulle på eventyr from 1979, and Verdens viktigste O from 1980. "Rulle" is a rounding cut in cardboard, experiencing exciting adventures among squares, triangles, half circles and other roundings. His book for deaf children include Fy katte! from 1982, and Pass på Lillebror from 1984. In cooperation with his wife Mette he made the picture book Ballsprett (1980) for mentally deficient children. Other books are Huset som ikke ville dø from 1987, Bacon og egg mot tegneserieheltene from 1988, and Drusilde from 1990. He has written the science fiction novels Roboten er løs! (1982), Robot i rommet (1984), and Ettersøkt – Roboten Matilda (1986). His book Robinson Crusoe Larsen came in 1994, Min venn Kong is from 1995, and Matilda, litt av en robot from 2002.

He received the Norwegian Critics Prize for Best children's book in 1985 for the children's book Soldreperen, together with his wife and co-writer Mette Newth.
