= Glomdalens Arbeiderblad =

Norwegian newspaper

Glomdalens Arbeiderblad was a Norwegian newspaper, published in Kongsvinger in Hedmark county. It was named Glommendalen from 1885 to 1915 and Glommendalens Social-Demokrat from 1915 to 1923.

It was started as Glommendalen on 1 March 1885, a newspaper for the region Glåmdalen. The first editor was Hans Aasumb, and the political affiliation was Liberal. The newspaper drifted slowly to the left, and it was bought by the Labour Party and the Norwegian Confederation of Trade Unions in 1914. The seller was Erik Lund, who had bought the newspaper in 1907 and continued as editor-in-chief. The newspaper was also merged with Solungen, whose last issue came in December 1914. From 1 April 1915 the merged newspaper was named Glommendalens Social-Demokrat.

On 30 April 1923 the name was changed to Glomdalens Arbeiderblad. Later in 1923 the Communist Party broke away from the Labour Party, and took with them the Glomdalens Arbeiderblad. The newspaper was published on a daily basis. Waldemar Carlsen, the editor-in-chief since 1916, remained in the editor chair until he quit his job in 1925 because he did not receive wages anymore. Arbeiderpressens Samvirke took over the newspaper, and declared bankruptcy in 1926. Then, Arbeiderpressens Samvirke used the newspaper's infrastructure to start and publish a new newspaper Kongsvinger Arbeiderblad, renamed Glåmdalen in 1943. Glomdalens Arbeiderblad continued with a Communist editor, but was now printed in Hamar. The newspaper went defunct after its last issue on 1 April 1927.
