= Kjell Underlid =

Norwegian psychologist

Kjell Underlid (June 24, 1950 – July 31, 2016) was a Norwegian psychologist and specialist in clinical psychology. He was mainly interested in social psychology. He became a professor at Bergen University College in 2005, where he had worked since 1990. His areas of interest included unemployment, poverty and social justice.

Underlid was born in Nyttingnes. From quite early in young adulthood, Underlid was active in the socialist movement in Norway. For many years, he was a member of the Socialist People's Party, through which he entered the Socialist Electoral League, later the Socialist Left Party, which he left in protest against what he perceived as a shift to the right under Erik Solheim. From 1993 to 2000 he was a member of the collective leadership of the Communist Party of Norway. He left that party in 2003 in protest against the party's shift toward Stalinism. Underlid was a member of the Movement for Socialism. Underlid died in Bergen on July 31, 2016.

== Bibliography ==
- Arbeidslaus (Jobless; Det Norske Samlaget, 1992)
- Gruppepsykologi (Group Psychology; Fagbokforlaget, 1997)
- Arbeidshefte til Gruppepsykologi (Workbook for Group Psychology; Fagbokforlaget, 1997)
- Fattigdommens psykologi (The Psychology of Poverty; Det Norske Samlaget, 2005)
- Sosial rettferd (Social Justice; Det Norske Samlaget, 2009)
- Å bli hersa med. Utilbørleg sosial dominans på arbeidsplassen (Being Bullied: Inappropriate Social Dominance in the Workplace; Gyldendal akademisk, 2013)
