= Norsk presses historie 1660–2010 =

Four volume work edited by Hans Fredrik Dahl

- Genre: History
- Publication date: April 2010

Norsk presses historie 1660–2010 is a four-volume work about the press media history of Norway. It was published in April 2010 by Universitetsforlaget, and was the first book of its kind in Norway.

== Structure and production ==
Hans Fredrik Dahl was the superior editor of all four volumes. The first volume, En samfunnsmakt blir til. 1660–1880 was edited by Martin Eide. The second volume, Presse, parti og publikum. 1880–1945 was edited by Rune Ottosen. The third volume, Imperiet vakler. 1945–2010 was edited by Guri Hjeltnes. The fourth volume, Norske aviser fra A til Å was edited by Idar Flo. While the first three volumes are written in regular prose, the fourth volume is more of an encyclopedia with about 400 "newspaper biographies".

Composed of 1925 pages across all volumes, the entire work cost 15 million kr and was finished after eleven years. Thirty people have provided a substantial amount of writing, while some 130 writers contributed with "newspaper biographies". The release date was scheduled in 2010 to celebrate the centennial anniversary of both the Norwegian Press Association and the Norwegian Media Businesses' Association, in addition to the sesquarcentennial anniversary of the introduction of absolute monarchy to the country. This way, the Norwegian press history is drawn back far earlier in time than the existence of newspapers and journalism. The original plan was to begin with 1763, the year when Norway's first newspaper—Norske Intelligenz-Seddeler—was established. Such a long-spanning history work on the press in Norway had hitherto not been written.

== Reception ==
In a lukewarm review for the VG newspaper, columnist Olav Versto criticized the third volume for not underlining VG's role enough, and academia in general for not understanding VG. Critic Sindre Hovdenakk insinuated that too much money had been spent on a not-brilliantly-written work. Handing out "die throws" (a review where 1 is worst, 6 is best) to each of the four volumes, he rated all the prose volumes as 4 and the biography volume as a 3. In Dagens Næringsliv the work with its several authors was criticized as being of uneven quality and precision. The reviewer titled his piece "Impossible".

The newspaper Dag og Tid praised the four volumes as a "standard work". Dagsavisen called it an "impressive chronicle". Klassekampen also received it favourably.

The work attracted little scholarly attention, yet Per Overrein reviewed its third volume in a 2011 issue of Historisk Tidsskrift. While applauding its thoroughness, usability and the individual efforts of the authors, he criticized the experimental nature of the work, its specious account of the role of Norwegian newspapers in the legal purge after World War II and its lack of coverage of the function that the Norwegian press played during the 1994 EU referendum.

Few local or regional newspapers published reviews of the work. A journalist in Sogn Avis praised the case study of Sogn og Fjordane in Eide's volume. Odd S. Lovoll criticized the work for not containing much about Norwegian diaspora newspapers in the United States.
