= Mr. George (group) =

- Origin: Sydney, New South Wales, Australia
- Genres: Rock; pop
- Years active: 1973–1975
- Label: Philips

Mr. George were an Australian rock and pop group formed in Sydney in 1973. Active until 1975, they released one studio album, On the Bandwagon (1974), and four singles. The group were advertised as a support act for David Cassidy and the Bee Gees during their Australian concert appearances in 1974.

== History ==
Mr. George formed in Sydney in 1973. The group's members were Alan Daniels, George Fisher, Norm Irwin, Richard Kett, Barry Rice and Jackie Rice.

In January 1974, Mr. George were announced as a support act for David Cassidy's Australian tour.

In August 1974, Mr. George were announced as a support act for the Bee Gees' Sydney concerts at the Hordern Pavilion. An advertisement published on 21 September 1974 identified Mr. George as the support group for the Bee Gees' concert on 23 September.

The group released their only studio album, On the Bandwagon, on Philips Records in 1974 (catalogue number 6357 019).

== Critical reception ==
Reviewing On the Bandwagon in The Sun-Herald on 20 October 1974, Gil Wahlquist described the group's sound as "smart, squeaky-clean" and commented favourably on the professionalism of the six Sydney musicians. He highlighted "Lazy Susan" for its timing and "I've Got to Know You" for the vocal performances of Jackie Rice and George Fisher. The review also discussed the group's theatrical approach to songs including "Higher and Higher" and "My Temperature's Rising".

== Members ==
- Alan Daniels – guitar
- George Fisher – bass
- Norm Irwin – vocals
- Richard Kett – drums
- Barry Rice – guitar
- Jackie Rice – vocals

== Discography ==
=== Studio albums ===
List of studio albums, with selected details
| Title | Album details |
|---|---|
| On the Bandwagon | Released: 1974; Format: LP; Label: Philips (6357019) |

=== Singles ===
List of singles, with selected chart positions
| Title | Year | Peak chart positions | Album |
| Title | Year | AUS | Album |
|---|---|---|---|
| "So Much Love (In My Heart)" | 1973 | 37 | On the Bandwagon |
| "Lazy Susan" | 1973 | 80 | On the Bandwagon |
| "Yesterday" | 1974 | — | On the Bandwagon |
| "Dock of the Bay" | 1974 | — | On the Bandwagon |
