= Mette Newth =

Norwegian illustrator, author of children's literature and organizer

- Born: 31 January 1942 (age 84); Oslo, Norway
- Education: Ceramist and sculptor
- Occupations: Illustrator, children's writer and educator
- Spouse: Philip Newth (m. 1963)
- Children: Eirik Newth; Hege Newth
- Father: Fridtjof Knutsen
- Awards: Norwegian Critics Prize for Literature

Mette Cecilie Newth (born 31 January 1942) is a Norwegian illustrator, author of children's literature, and organizer. She received the Norwegian Critics Prize for Best children's book.

== Personal life ==
Mette Newth was born in Oslo as the daughter of journalist, crime writer and revue writer Fridtjof Knutsen and his wife Alfhild Gundersen (known as the crime writer Lalli Knutsen, and under the pseudonym Lalli Løvland). She married writer Philip Newth in 1963. The couple settled at Rykkinn in Bærum, and have a son Eirik Newth, an author and Hege Newth (1966-2025) who was a writer.

== Career ==
Mette Newth is educated as a ceramicist from the Norwegian National Academy of Craft and Art Industry and has studied sculpture at the Norwegian National Academy of Fine Arts. She made her literary debut in 1969 with the picture book Den lille vikingen. Her breakthrough as illustrator came with Lille Skrekk from 1975, about a lizard child. Her book Skomakerdokka from 1977 was inspired by Alf Prøysen's stories. She has illustrated books for deaf children, using sign language. Her book Nora og ordene from 1979, about a deaf girl, uses both text and sign language. In cooperation with her husband Philip she made the picture book Ballsprett (1980) for mentally deficient children. She received the Norwegian Critics Prize for Best children's book in 1985 for the children's book Soldreperen, together with her husband and co-writer Philip Newth. Her youth's novel Bortførelsen from 1987 (translated by Steven T. Murray and Tiina Nunnally as The Abduction) received international recognition and was translated into 14 different languages. The novel treats the colonialization of Greenland in the 17th century, and includes elements from Inuit myths and legends. Her book Erobringen from 1988 is also about the Inuit. Among the picture books she has made in cooperation with the writer Paal-Helge Haugen are Vårfuglen from 1989, Gjennom steinen from 1990, and Eldsalamanderen from 1994. In 1995, she received the critics' prize for the second time, for the children's book Det mørke lyset. This novel treats the situation of the lepers in Norway in the early 19th century. She chaired the organization Norwegian Writers for Children (Ungdomslitteraturens forfatterlag) for two periods, from 1977 to 1979 and from 1981 to 1982. She was the rector of the Oslo National Academy of the Arts from 1999 to 2002.
