= Halden Arbeiderblad =

Norwegian language local newspaper

- Owner(s): Amedia (100%)
- Editor: Frode Rekve
- Founded: 1929
- Political alignment: Labour Party; Non-partisan
- Headquarters: Halden, Norway
- Website: https://ha-halden.no

Halden Arbeiderblad is a Norwegian language local newspaper published in Halden, Norway.

== History and profile ==
Halden Arbeiderblad was established in 1929 as a Labour Party newspaper, but later became non-partisan. It was stopped between October 1940 and June 1945 due to the German occupation of Norway, and the editor-in-chief Johannes Stubberud was sent to a concentration camp.

In addition to Halden, the newspaper covers the municipality of Aremark. In 2008 it had a circulation of 8,533 copies of which 8,267 were through subscription. It is published by Halden Arbeiderblad AS, which is owned 41.5% by A-pressen, 14.7% by the Labour Party, 19.9% by local trade unions and 23.9% by various others.
