= Kråkerøy =

Island in Norway

Coordinates: 59°12′N 10°56′E

Kråkerøy is an island and a former municipality in Østfold, Norway.

The island of Kråkerøy was separated from Glemmen as a municipality of its own January 1, 1908. At that time Kråkerøy had a population of 3,311. The rural municipality was (together with Borge, Onsøy and Rolvsøy) merged with the city of Fredrikstad January 1, 1994. Prior to the merger Kråkerøy had a population of 7,445.

In 1948 Kråkerøy was the site of the Kråkerøy speech by then Prime Minister Einar Gerhardsen, which became an important part of Norwegian political history.

== The name ==
The Norse form of the name was Krákarøy. The first element is (probably) the genitive case of kráka meaning 'crow', the last element is øy meaning 'island'.
