= Eirik Newth =

Norwegian astrophysicist and author

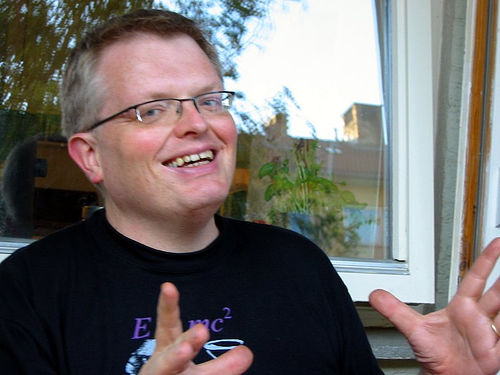
- Born: 17 August 1964 (age 61); Bergen, Norway
- Occupations: astrophysicist, writer of popular science for children, and media personality.
- Awards: Brage Prize (1996)

Eirik Newth (born 17 August 1964) is a Norwegian astrophysicist, writer of popular science for children, and media personality. He received the Brage Prize in 1996 for the children's book Jakten på sannheten.

He is the son of author and illustrator couple Philip and Mette Newth, and a maternal grandson of writer couple Fridtjof and Lalli Knutsen.

== Selected works ==
- Se opp på vår egen stjernehimmel (1992)
- Sola – vår egen stjerne (1994)
- Jakten på sannheten – vitenskapens historie (1996)
- Tallenes Verden (2002)
- Neopangea (Science fiction novel, 2006)

== Awards ==
- Brage Prize 1996

Awards
Preceded by Akin Duzakin; Liv Marie Austrem	Recipient of the Brage Prize for children and youth 1996	Succeeded by Harald Rosenløw Eeg
