= Einhart Lorenz =

German-Norwegian historian (born 1940)

Einhart Lorenz (born 17 February 1940) is a German-Norwegian historian, and professor emeritus at the University of Oslo. Among his publications are his thesis from 1978, in German: Norwegische Arbeiterbewegung und Kommunistische Internationale 1913–1930, Willy Brandt in Norwegen (1989), Exil in Norwegen (1992) and Willy Brandt. Deutscher-Europäer-Weltbürger (2013), in Norwegian: Willy Brandt i Norge, eksilåra 1933–1940 from 1989, Samefolket i historien from 1991, Det er ingen sak å få partiet lite. NKP 1923-1931 (1983), Veien mot Holocaust (2003), Jødisk historie, kultur og identiteter (2010) and Willy Brandt. Et politisk liv (2013). He was the first Henrik Steffens Professor at the Humboldt University of Berlin from 1998 to 2001.

== Personal life ==
Lorenz was born in Hirschberg (today Jelenia Góra) on 17 February 1940.
