= Vestfold Arbeiderblad =

Norwegian newspaper (1909–1988)

Vestfold Arbeiderblad, often referred to as simply as VA and for a long period just Vestfold, was a daily newspaper published in Tønsberg, Norway.

== History and profile ==
The paper was established in 1909 under the name Vestfold Arbeiderblad. The first issue was published on 2 June 1909, ahead of elections to the Norwegian Storting in the autumn of the same year. Initially the paper only came out a few days a week and contained only a few pages. Everything except printing was done by volunteers. By 1911 circulation was 640. The paper became a daily in 1916. Politically it belonged to the Norwegian Labour Party, but in 1924 it was usurped by the newly established Communist Party. The Labour Party eventually found a new newspaper in Vestfold Socialdemokrat, founded in 1921 as a local organ for the Social Democratic Labour Party. Vestfold Socialdemokrat took the name Vestfold Arbeiderblad in 1929—by that time the Communist newspaper of the same name had gone defunct. Vestfold Arbeiderblad was stopped between September 1940 and May 1945, during the German occupation of Norway.

The most popular newspaper in the Tønsberg area was the Conservative Tønsbergs Blad. On the other hand, Vestfold Arbeiderblad was the largest newspaper in Holmestrand Municipality and Hof Municipality. It absorbed other Labour Party newspapers; Horten Arbeiderblad in 1962 and Vestfold Fremtid in 1983. By 1983 had a circulation of about 8,500 copies compared to 26,248 copies of Tønsbergs Blad. Vestfold Arbeiderblad went defunct in 1988.
