= Arbeidets Rett =

Newspaper

- Owner: Amedia (100%)
- Founded: 1907; 119 years ago
- Political alignment: Social democracy
- Headquarters: Røros
- Circulation: 6 706 (2017)
- Website: https://retten.no

Arbeidets Rett is a local newspaper published in Røros Municipality, Norway.

== History and profile ==
Arbeidets Rett was first published as Mauren on 16 January 1907, but has been published under the current name since 4 January 1912. The newspaper is owned by A-Pressen. Its headquarters is in Røros.

Arbeidets Rett is published three times per week. The paper had a circulation of 8,441 copies in 2007.

Arbeidets Rett was named media house of the year in the Amedia media group in 2025.
