= Hamar Arbeiderblad =

Newspaper published in Hamar, Norway

Hamar Arbeiderblad

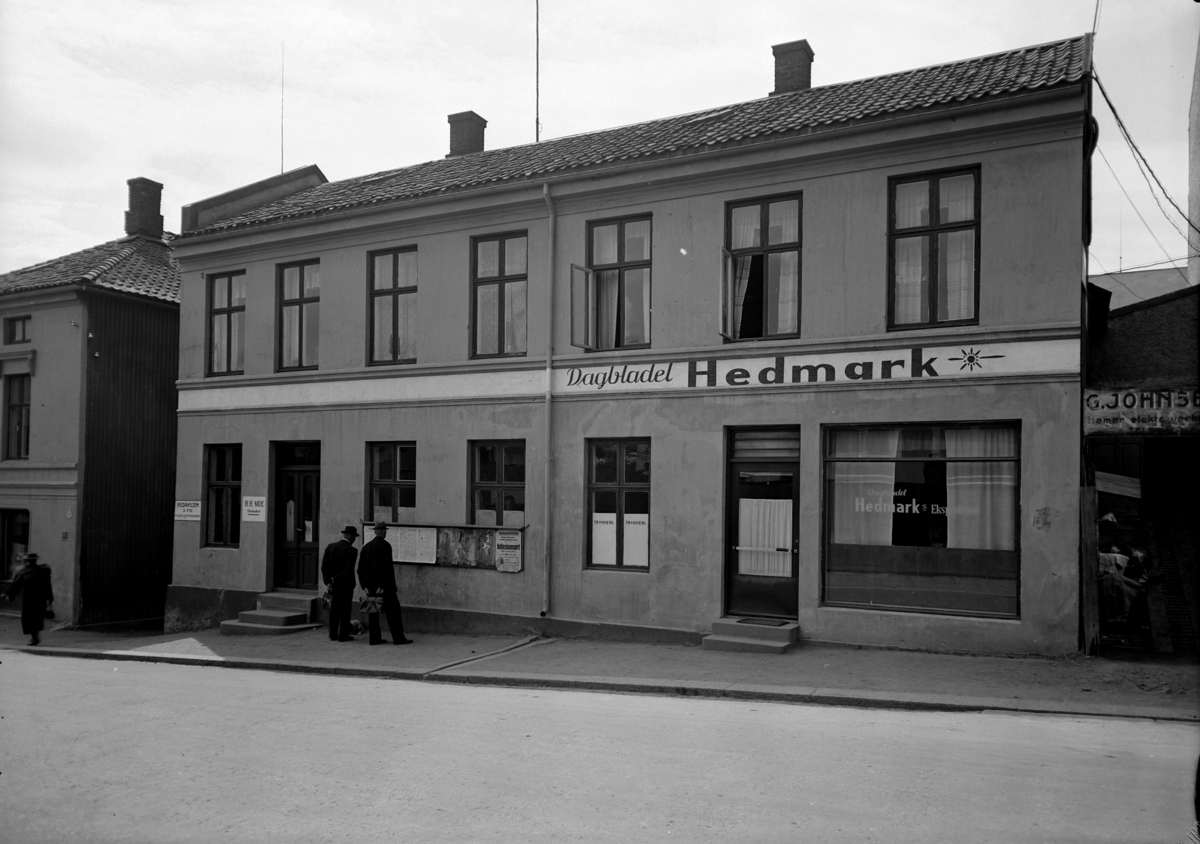
Hamar Arbeiderblad had offices in Grønnegata 32 during world war two and was known as Hedmark.

Hamar Arbeiderblad (often referred to locally as "HA") is local newspaper published in Hamar, Norway by Hamar Media. The paper is edited by Carsten Bleness. HA was one of the first newspapers to place the internet edition of a newspaper behind a paywall. Access to the internet edition is free for annual subscribers to the print edition. Access to the internet edition costs the same as the print edition.

== History ==
The first edition of Hamar Arbeiderblad was published on 30 March 1925 with a print run of 1200 copies. Local branches of the Labour Party in the municipalities of Hamar, Vang, Stange, Romedal, Løten, Ringsaker, and Nes were behind the founding of the newspaper. It was considered that Hamar and the surrounding areas needed their own newspaper. The paper's first editor was Nils Hønsvald. The paper got its own printing press in 1927.

The paper was originally distributed to municipalities around Hedmarken. In 1932, distribution was extended to include Østerdalen.

The paper is now the largest newspaper in Hedmark. It has also grown from being a party organ of the Norwegian Labour Party to being a politically independent local newspaper, but it kept its original name all the same.

A new period of investment started in 1985, which meant that new equipment and a new production site came on stream in May 1987. Starting in January 1998 the paper began a gradual change to tabloid format, a process which was completed by 12 April 1991.

The paper published a 20-page supplement when HamKam was promoted to the Norwegian Premier League in 2003. The paper has published a feature-heavy magazine called HA Pluss on Saturdays since 2005.

=== Second World War ===
On 9 April 1940 -the day Germany invaded Norway- the paper came out strongly against the invasion. From 15 April to 18 April the paper cooperated with Hamar Stiftstidende and switched printing presses, before it was evaluated whether the business could continue. The paper was published again on 3 May with Håkon Hoff as editor. The paper expressed the opinion that war had come to Norway because of France and England, but also was of the opinion that the Nasjonal Samling had no mandate to represent Norwegian interests.

On 25 September 1940 the offices in Hamar and Elverum were closed by German police. The board was fired and Hoff (the editor) was informed by telegramme from the Police Department that he was no longer allowed to work at the paper. Later the same day he was informed that there had been a misunderstanding. The paper was published again after a week, but Nazi propaganda was now more significant. In March 1941 Sigmund Stafne, a journalist, was dismissed by the Press Directorate. Arthur Martinsen quit. Both ended up in Sweden. Hoff resigned on 12 July 1941. "One of a newspaper's duties is to build on reality, however hard and uncomfortable they may be." he wrote in his last article for the paper. Hoff later became the editor of an illegal newspaper. Oddvar Røst took over as editor of HA.

On 25 September 1941 the paper was instructed to comment on the fact that it had been one year since Josef Terboven, Reichskommissar of Norway had named members of the Council of State, but Røst did not write what the Germans had been expecting. Norwegians would never "give up the dream of a free Norway as long as the soldiers of another nation were on Norwegian soil." Røst was interrogated for six hours by the head of the Gestapo in Lillehammer. He was not allowed to leave the paper, but was not allowed to write for it either. He left the paper on 31 January 1942. Bernhard Dippner, a member of Nasjonal Samling took over. He was later arrested and accused of being a communist. Bjørn Wentzel and Arthur Lodding were also editors before publication was stopped.

The paper was merged with Hamar Stiftstidende in 1943, a plan which had originally been mooted by the Department of Culture and People's Information in 1940. The authorities changed the name of the paper to Hedmark in 1943. On 1 July the Press Directorate stopped publication of both newspapers and started a paper called Dagbladet Hedmark in their place. It was printed at the press previously used by Hamar Stiftstidende. After the war, production of the paper resumed.

== Circulation ==
In 2014, it was the largest newspaper in Hedmark, with a circulation of 22,407.
