= Glåmdalen (newspaper) =

Norwegian newspaper

- Type: Daily newspaper
- Format: Tabloid (1997–present)
- Owner: Amedia (100%)
- Editor: Rolf Nordberg
- Founded: 1926
- Political alignment: Labour; Non-partisan
- Headquarters: Kongsvinger, Norway
- Circulation: 16,523 (2013)
- OCLC number: 1640798
- Website: glomdalen.no

Glåmdalen is a local newspaper published in Kongsvinger, Norway. It is named after the district Glåmdalen, and covers southern Innlandet and northeastern Akershus counties. The newspaper has offices in Solør, Skarnes, and Årnes.

== History and profile ==
The newspaper was established in 1926 as Kongsvinger Arbeiderblad, and had a connection to the Norwegian Labour Party. It changed its name in 1943, and later became non-partisan. Glåmdalen changed to tabloid format in 1997 and launched its Internet site in 2000.

Glåmdalen is published by the company Glåmdalen AS, which is owned 100% by Amedia. In 2011, the paper won the World Young Reader Prize of WAN/IFRA in the Public Service category.

In a study dated 2016 Glåmdalen was found to contain the epithet Negro (Norwegian: neger) at the lowest frequency in the period between 1970 and 2014 with 14 references.

Glåmdalen had a circulation of 18,531 in 2010. The 2013 circulation of the paper was 16,523 copies. Next year it sold 15,4244 copies.
