= Communist Party of Norway =

Communist Party of Norway Norges Kommunistiske Parti
- Leader: Runa Evensen
- Founded: 4 November 1923
- Split from: Norwegian Labour Party
- Headquarters: Helgesens gate 21, Oslo
- Newspaper: Friheten
- Youth wing: Young Communists in Norway
- Ideology: Communism; Marxism–Leninism; Hard Euroscepticism
- Political position: Far-left
- European affiliation: INITIATIVE (until 2023)
- International affiliation: IMCWP
- Colours: Red
- Slogan: Folkemakt mot pengemakt! (English: People's power over monetary power!)
- Storting: 0 / 169
- County Councils: 0 / 728
- Municipal / City Councils: 0 / 10,781
- Sami Parliament: 0 / 39

Website
- www.nkp.no

The Communist Party of Norway (Norwegian: Norges Kommunistiske Parti, NKP) is a Marxist-Leninist party in Norway. It was formed in 1923, following a split in the Norwegian Labour Party.

From its onset the NKP accepted Bolshevization and the Soviet Union's leading role in the Communist International. As such, it followed the official line of the Communist Party of the Soviet Union and was particularly critical of Trotskyism and Titoism during Joseph Stalin's tenure as the leader of the Soviet Union.

During the Second World War, the NKP initially opposed active resistance to the German occupation, in deference to the non-aggression pact between the Soviet Union and Nazi Germany. Once Germany terminated the pact and attacked the Soviet Union, the Communist Party of Norway joined the resistance.

As a result of its role in the anti-Nazi struggle, the NKP experienced a brief surge in popularity immediately after the war, but popular sympathy waned with the onset of the Cold War. The ruling Labour Party took a hard line against the communists, culminating in Prime Minister Einar Gerhardsen's 1948 condemnatory Kråkerøy speech. Norwegian authorities considered the party an extremist organization, and its activities would be closely monitored by the Police Surveillance Agency throughout the Cold War.

Ideologically, the NKP has evolved since its founding. It followed Khrushchev's lead by formally denouncing Stalin's rule after his death in 1953, but remained pro-Soviet until the end of the Cold War, despite occasional instances of disagreement. After the collapse of the Soviet Union, the party has recognized some of the flaws of the Soviet model. It nonetheless supports traditional Soviet historiography and pro-Russian political views, opposing NATO, the European Union and the United States.

The NKP has been a marginal force in Norwegian politics since the late 1940s. It held a single seat in the parliament as late as 1961, but it has not been represented in any elected bodies in recent decades. In the 2025 parliamentary elections, it received only 50 votes (0.00%).

== History ==
=== Background, establishment, and pre-war era ===
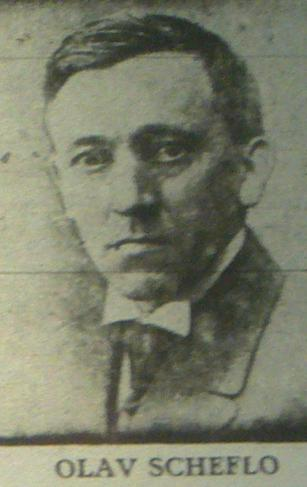
Olav Scheflo (pictured) led the pro-Comintern wing within the Labour Party until the establishment of the Norwegian Communist Party

The Norwegian Labour Party (DNA) became a member of the Communist International (Comintern) in 1919 under the leadership of Martin Tranmæl. While Tranmæl at first supported the move of becoming a Comintern member, he became increasingly skeptical of it after the proclamation of the twenty-one conditions which stated that members had to enforce democratic centralism and party discipline. Even so, Tranmæl continued to support the Labour Party's membership, even if that meant a future split within the party between the left and the right. A split did occur along factional lines in 1921 and led to the establishment of the Social Democratic Labour Party. A power struggle soon erupted between the Tranmælists and the supporters of Olav Scheflo, the party's parliamentary leader, following Kyrre Grepp's absence due to illness and later death in 1922. The reason for the struggle was Tranmæl's desire to block Grepp from becoming the party's next leader; Grepp was a supporter of the Comintern line.

By the time of the 4th World Congress of the Comintern, in which a policy of strengthening the apparatus of the member parties took place, Tranmæl had had enough of what he saw as the Comintern's meddling in the internal affairs of the Labour Party. He managed to get a majority within the Central Board for a withdrawal of its Comintern membership, but the Comintern's representative, Karl Radek, managed, with a bit of maneuvering, to get the majority of the party's National Board to vote in favour of retaining its Comintern membership. Before the Labour Party conference in February 1921, Tranmæl came up with the Kristiania proposal, a declaration of semi-independence from Comintern. The Kristiania proposal supported retaining membership in the Comintern, if the Labour Party could operate on more independent lines. At the conference a majority, by a margin of two votes, voted in favour of the proposal. The Comintern representative at the party conference, Nikolai Bukharin, grudgingly accepted the vote. The power struggle between the Tranmælists and the Scheflo wing continued, even more aggressively, until the extraordinary party conference of November 1923 which voted in favour of withdrawing the Labour Party from the Comintern. As a reaction, the Scheflo wing left the party and established the Norwegian Communist Party. Organisationally, the Communist Party continued the representation of Norway in the Comintern.

Thirteen of the Labour members of parliament joined the Communist Party, as did large parts of the trade union opposition to the Labour Party. The newly established party elected Sverre Støstad as chairman, Halvard Olsen as deputy chairman, and Peder Furubotn as general secretary. The party managed to gain 6.1 percent of the votes in the 1924 parliamentary election, but its vote share decreased to 4 percent in 1927, and further in 1930 to 1.7 percent. At the same time, its membership slowly decreased, and by the 1930s the party had lost much of its former influence.

The 1924 election was a failure for the party; the party became the third largest left-wing party, behind the Labour Party and the Social Democratic Labour Party. The Communist Party had failed to restrengthen the Comintern organisation in Norway after the 1923 split. The 1925 conference focused on the party's organisational structure; a structural proposed by the Comintern was duly accepted by a majority at the conference.

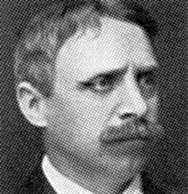
Adam Egede-Nissen was the party's chairman from 1934 to 1946, even if he had in fact lost formal powers by the 1940s

Parallel to its decreasing electoral influence, the party was ravaged by internal strife. Halvard Olsen and other trade union leaders left the party in 1924, in protest over the trade union policy of the Communist Party. Sverre Støstad, Fredrik Monsen, and Olav Larssen were excluded from the party in 1927 because of disagreements surrounding the reunification of the Labour Party (which merged with the Social Democratic Labour Party). Jeanette Olsen, Emil Stang Jr., and Scheflo left the party in 1928 due to their disappointment with how the Communist Party reacted towards the first DNA government, Hornsrud's Cabinet. In 1927, the Mot Dag group, a circle of leftwing intellectuals, joined the party. They would leave the following year, as the Communist Party took an 'ultra-left turn'.

The Comintern demanded in the summer of 1927 that the Communist Party move further to the left. The move to the left was characterised by a more open "class against class politics, in which the social democrats were designated as the primary enemy" of communism. At the 9th Plenum of the Central Committee in 1928, they denounced the right-wing faction for supporting the Labour government of Christopher Hornsrud. The 9th Plenum led to a further reduction of party members, but Furobotn and the Communist Party continued to be loyal to the line set by the Comintern. There was no significant dissent within the party against the Comintern line, and the party became vehemently loyal to it; it began to accuse the Labour Party of being social fascist, and further claimed that the Labour Party had stopped being a workers party. This policy led to further marginalisation of the party by the 1930s. In 1930 the Comintern directly interfered into the affairs of the NKP, when it ordered Furubotn, the party chairman, to visit the Soviet Union. In 1933 the party took the initiative to propose a collaboration with the Labour in the 1933 parliamentary election in correlation with the Comintern's policy of a Popular Front. The proposal was rejected, but the Communist Party continued to propose a collaboration of sorts to the Labour Party in 1935, 1936, and in 1937. The Labour Party continued to be interested in such a proposal as long as the Communist Party and itself were unified organisationally. From 1938 onwards, the Communists' relations with other parties reached an all-time low, and by the time of the German invasion of Norway in 1940, the party was in a crisis. The Norwegian public had begun to see the NKP as a tool of Moscow.

=== Second World War ===
At the onset of the Second World War, the NKP subscribed to the Molotov–Ribbentrop Pact between Germany and the Soviet Union. The DNA government, on the other hand, aligned with the United Kingdom. During the Finnish Winter War, NKP supported the Soviet war effort, whereas DNA supported the opposing side. DNA-NKP relations deteriorated further, reaching a historic low.

Germany invaded Norway on 9 April 1940. The NKP publication Arbeideren ("The Worker") proclaimed that the war was an imperialist war, and that Germany and the Western powers were equally responsible for its outbreak. According to that analysis the party should not take sides for one of the imperialist powers, a policy that was in clear opposition to the (then exiled) DNA government.

However, local Communist Party cells in northern Norway began (without the consent of the party leadership) to mobilize resistance activities.

In August 1940, NKP was the first Norwegian political party to be banned by the German occupation authorities. The publication of Arbeideren ceased. The party then went underground. However, it was poorly prepared for underground functioning. In the ongoing confusion within the party, Furubotn began to call for more active NKP resistance against the occupation. Furubotn had spent several years in Moscow, but returned to Norway just before the war. Now he was the leader of the party in Vestlandet. On 31 December 1941, the party held a clandestine national conference, which adopted Furubotn's 'active war policy'.

The NKP came to play a leading role in the resistance movement, organizing sabotage and guerrilla activities. Although different sectors of the resistance showed a united front towards the occupants, the relation between NKP and the Home Front, the government-in-exile, and the clandestine trade union movement were not always smooth as the government advocated only peaceful resistance, such as media and intelligence support for the allies, until the last years of the war, when these elements of resistance were to join actively. Generally, the NKP wanted to adopt more offensive tactics against the occupants. It also created an illegal newspaper, Friheten, or "Liberty", which is still in print.

=== Postwar resurgence ===
After the war, NKP enjoyed a strong increase in popularity for its role in resistance struggle. The role the Soviet Union had played in defeating Germany, and in particular the Soviet liberation of Finnmark in northern Norway, also contributed to the popularity of the party.

In the national unity government formed after the war, two communists were included: Johan Strand Johansen and Kirsten Hansteen. Hansteen was the first female minister in Norwegian history. The party organ, Friheten, would reach a readership of approximately 100,000 directly after the war. In the new postwar atmosphere of tolerance, discussions were raised over a possible reunification between DNA and NKP. During the war, discussions had taken place in the Grini concentration camp between captured DNA and NKP leaders (including Einar Gerhardsen from DNA and Jørgen Vogt from NKP). However, these plans were discarded by Furubotn.

In the 1945 parliamentary election, the NKP vote share reached its historical peak. NKP received 176,535 votes (11.89%) and won eleven seats in the Storting. In 1946 Furubotn was elected general secretary of the NKP.

==== Onset of the Cold War ====
However, the growth of the party proved to be brief. The Cold War began, and the Norwegian government aligned itself with the Western powers. In the 1949 parliamentary election the NKP lost many voters. The party received 102,722 votes (5.83%).

The reason for the party's decline in popularity is often accredited to Labour Party Prime Minister Einar Gerhardsen's famous speech at Kråkerøy in 1948, four days after the communist takeover in Czechoslovakia. In it, he condemned the actions in Czechoslovakia, but also warned that the same thing could happen in Norway if the Communist Party was given too much power. The speech represented the start of both an open and underground campaign against the party and its members, with the purpose of scaring away voters and reducing its influence in the labour movement.

At the same time, the party would experience its most traumatic internal division. In 1946 some of Furubotn's closest associates during the war, Kjell G. Kviberg and Ørnulf Egge, were expelled. In 1949 Furubotn's enemies within the party began a campaign to expel him.

On 24 October 1949, MP Johan Strand Johansen publicly declared that a division existed within the party in a speech to the local party unit in Malerne. The following day Furubotn's followers resigned from their positions. On 26 October Furubotn and his followers were expelled. The editorial of Friheten on 27 October proclaimed that "It has emerged clearly that this anti-party centre is a Trotskyist, bourgeois nationalist and Titoist centre, which has paralysed the central board with endless and futile discussions." Moreover, in an article in the same newspaper published on 11 November 1949, read: "It is clear that within our party there are nationalist, petty bourgeois, Trotskyist, Titoist elements, enemies of the Soviet Union and socialism, that may form a base for recruitment of agents to the bourgeois states and the counter revolution." This process contributed to the ongoing political isolation of the NKP. The expulsion of Furubotn, considered a hero of the resistance struggle, was in many ways a political suicide. The manner in which the expulsions had been conducted and the strong language used in the NKP press against those expelled contributed to an image of NKP as a 'conspirational' party.

=== Cold War years ===
The NKP was broadly considered to be a loyal follower of the Communist Party of the Soviet Union, although it occasionally took independent positions opposing the Soviet line. This happened in 1968, when the NKP condemned the Soviet-led invasion of Czechoslovakia. The youth league, the Young Communist League of Norway (NKU), followed a somewhat more independent line than the party.

In the mid-1960s, the U.S. State Department estimated the party membership to be approximately 4500 (0.2% of the working age population of the country).

In the parliamentary elections of 1973, the party participated in an electoral alliance with the Socialist People's Party and other left-wing groups, known as the Socialist Electoral League, and had its leader, Reidar Larsen, elected into parliament. In 1975, the Socialist Electoral League became the Socialist Left Party, which is today Norway's largest party to the left of the Norwegian Labour Party. The Communist Party took part in the process of transforming the electoral league to a new party, but in the end decided to remain a separate party. At the party congress in 1975, 113 delegates voted to maintain the party's independence, whereas 30 voted for a merger with the SV. Larsen did not stand for re-election, and Martin Gunnar Knutsen was elected as the new party chairman. After the congress, Larsen and others left the NKP to join the Socialist Left Party.

After Mikhail Gorbachev gained power in the Soviet Union and started his reform program, the NKP, like most other European Communist parties did, started revising its views of past Soviet policies. The party began to distance itself from the practises of the Soviet Union, and focused on a "softer" communism. The term "democratic socialism" is frequently found in party literature from the early 1990s onward.

=== Post-Soviet world ===
Around 1990, there were also tendencies within the NKP working for regroupment. In the 1989 parliamentary election they joined forces with Workers' Communist Party (AKP), Red Electoral Alliance (RV), and independent socialists to form Fylkeslistene for miljø og solidaritet (County lists for Environment and Solidarity). The NKP also had joint lists with RV some places in the early 1990s, while elsewhere NKP members campaigned for the RV. This policy of unity was, however, abandoned around the mid-1990s.

A defining moment in this process came when the party opposed the Soviet coup attempt of 1991 against Gorbachev by the "old guard" of the Soviet communist party.

Today, the party's statement of principles explicitly acknowledges that the Soviet Union represented a violation of democratic principles and that the party has to take responsibility for its lack of criticism of these problems. The party nonetheless views these examples of socialism as progressive with respect to their preceding regimes.

Even though the NKP survived the collapse of the Soviet Union, inner turmoil, and particularly lack of recruitment amongst youth, has since marginalized the party further.

In the early 1990s, the party attempted to counteract some of this by electing younger leaders to the party's top positions. However, this move failed to significantly boost recruitment, and subsequently the party's leadership was again dominated by older members, many of whom joined during the Soviet era.

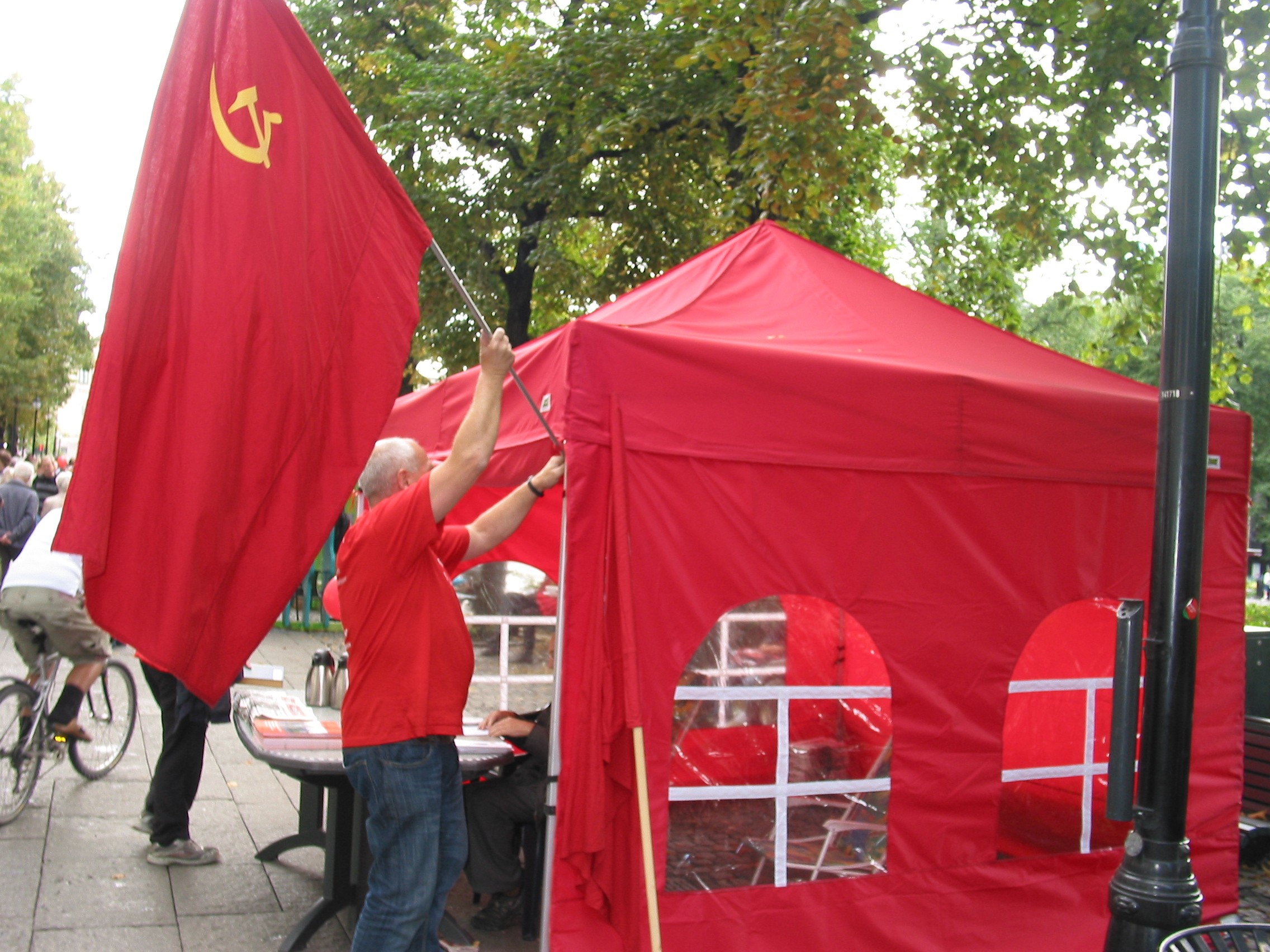
Campaign booth ahead of the 2009 election.

The NKP won three elected posts in the 2003 municipal elections, two seats in the municipal council in Åsnes Municipality and one in Vadsø Municipality. The Åsnes branch, by far the party's strongest at that time, left the party in 2004 to form Radical Socialists due to disagreements over the questions of religion, Joseph Stalin, and cooperation with other leftist groups. In addition, an NKP member was a member of the municipal council of Porsgrunn Municipality, elected on the RV list until he joined the RV. In later elections the NKP has received about 1,000 votes. In the 2005 parliamentary election, it won 1,070 votes – 0.04% of the national total. In 2007, it could not find enough candidates for a list in Vadsø Municipality, and thus does not currently have any democratically elected representatives.

In 2006-2008, NKP's youth league was changed from the old Young Communist League of Norway, to the new Young Communist League in Norway. The new league changed its name in 2008 to the Youth Communists in Norway.

The party still publishes a weekly newspaper called Friheten ("The Freedom"), which was started as a clandestine paper in 1941.

== Organization ==
=== Press ===
The party won control of eleven of the Labour Party newspapers. These were (some with new names after the communist takeover): Arbeidet, Ny Tid, Arbeideren, Vestfold Arbeiderblad, Glomdalens Arbeiderblad, Bratsberg-Demokraten, Fritt Folk, Follo Arbeiderblad, Gudbrandsdalens Arbeiderblad, Hardanger Arbeiderblad and Ny Dag. The communist party also usurped Møre Arbeiderblad, which had not yet achieved official Labour Party status. Nordlys was acquired, temporarily lost in mid-November 1923, then published as communist again until 20 January 1924 when it again became aligned with Labour. Some newspapers, such as Østerdalens Arbeiderblad had sympathized with the communist opposition while it was a part of the Labour Party, but after the actual split the Labour Party managed to turn the tide and retain them. The Communist Party also took over the ideological publication Klassekampen (belonged to the Young Communist League of Norway) and started Gnisten and Proletaren. Newly established communist newspapers within the party's first year of existence were the main organ Norges Kommunistblad as well as Akershus Folkeblad, Buskerud-Arbeideren, Friheten, Troms Fylkes Kommunistblad, Dagens Nyheter and Finnmark Fremtid. Many became defunct after a short time.

The Communist Party also had a range of company newspapers, for laborers in specific companies or specific industries. In Oslo there were Arbeidersken, Brygger'n, Den unge arbeider, Hammer'n, Huken, Kommunarden, Nødsarbeideren (renamed Steinspruten), Skyttelen, Sporvekselen and Stemplet. In Bergen there were Byggeren, Hermetikboksen, Kommuneproletaren and Transportproletaren (renamed Havnearbeideren). In Trondheim there were Filkloa and Signal. Einhart Lorenz has also registered seventeen other company newspapers from across the country. Nearly all were founded in 1925 or 1926, and nearly all went defunct between 1925 and 1928. The only exception as to foundation was Verksteds-Arbeideren, founded in Drammen in 1924, and the only newspaper which survived beyond 1928 was Kommuneproletaren, which existed until 1931.

== Leaders ==
- Sverre Støstad (1923–1925)
- Peder Furubotn (1925–1930)
- Henry W. Kristiansen (1931–1934)
- Adam Egede-Nissen (1934–1946)
- Emil Løvlien (1946–1965)
- Reidar T. Larsen (1965–1975)
- Martin Gunnar Knutsen (1975–1982)
- Hans I. Kleven (1982–1987)
- Kåre André Nilsen (1987–1991)
- Ingve Iversen (1991–1993)
- Collective leadership (1993–2000)
  - Terje Krogh, Per Lothar Lindtner and Kjell Underlid (1993–1998)
  - Per Lothar Lindtner and Kjell Underlid (1998–2000)
- Per Lothar Lindtner (2000–2001)
- Zafer Gözet (2001–2010)
- Svend Haakon Jacobsen (2010–2013)
- Jørgen Hovde (2013–2014)
- Runa Evensen (2014–present)

=== Party Congresses ===
- 3. landsmøte 1929 9-13. february Oslo

== Popular support and electoral results ==
Currently, the party retains its strongest bases of support in Oslo, Finnmark, Troms, Tromsø, and Namsos. Historically Åsnes and Trondheim were strongholds of the party.

=== Storting (parliament) ===
Storting
Election year	# of overall votes	% of overall vote	# of overall seats won	±
1924	59,401	6.1	6 / 150	
1927	40,075	4.0	3 / 150	▼3
1930	20,351	1.7	0 / 150	▼3
1933	22,773	1.8	0 / 150	0
1936	4,376	0.3	0 / 150	0
1945	176,535	11.9	11 / 150	▲11
1949	107,722	5.8	0 / 150	▼11
1953	90,422	5.1	3 / 150	▲3
1957	60,060	3.4	1 / 150	▼2
1961	53,678	2.9	0 / 150	▼1
1965	27,996	1.4	0 / 150	0
1969	21,517	1.0	0 / 150	0
1973	241,851	11.2 (Note: In 1973 NKP participated through the Socialist Electoral League, which became the Socialist Left Party in 1975. The list gained 16 seats, of which one was a member of NKP. The party didn't want to dissolve to become a member of the new party, and voted against membership.)	1 / 155	▲1
1977	8,448	0.4	0 / 155	▼1
1981	6,673	0.3	0 / 155	0
1985	4,245	0.2	0 / 157	0
1989	22,139	0.8 (Note: In 1989 NKP participated in County Lists for Environment and Solidarity with Red Electoral Alliance and various local groups and independents.)	0 / 165	0
1993	361	0.0	0 / 165	0
1997	1,979	0.1	0 / 165	0
2001	1,726	0.1	0 / 165	0
2005	1,070	0.0	0 / 169	0
2009	697	0.0	0 / 169	0
2013	611	0.0	0 / 169	0
2017	309	0.0	0 / 169	0
2021	308	0.0	0 / 169	0
2025	50	0.0	0 / 169	0

=== County Councils ===
County Councils
Election year	# of overall votes	% of overall vote	# of overall seats won	±
1991	1,339	0.1	0 / 977	0
1995	2,072	0.1	0 / 953	0
1999	2,263	0.1	0 / 939	0
2003	1,430	0.1	0 / 787	0
2007	1,210	0.1	0 / 728	0
2011	1,282	0.1	0 / 787	0
2019	823	0.1	0 / 787	0

== Bibliography ==
- Johansen, Jahn Otto; Sparring, Åke (1965). Kommunismen i Norden och den världskommunistiska rörelsens kris (in Swedish) (1st ed.). Stockholm, Sweden: Bokförlaget Aldus/Bonniers.
