= Knut Eik-Nes =

Norwegian priest and cultural worker

Knut Eik-Nes (21 July 1885 – 18 January 1968) was a Norwegian priest and cultural worker.

He was born in Sauda as a son of merchant Christian Sigbjørn Næss and Eli Eik. He finished his secondary education in Stavanger in 1910, and studied briefly at Oxford University. He graduated with the cand.theol. degree in 1915, and worked in the Diocese of Nidaros from the same year. From 1920 to 1955 he was vicar in Sparbu; from 1935 he doubled as vicar and dean of Nord-Innherred deanery. He was also chairman of the cultural association Noregs Ungdomslag from 1936 to 1947, except for the years 1940 to 1945 when Nazi Germany occupied Norway. During his time as chairman, the association arranged summer meetings attended by 100,000 people in total. While studying, he had been a board member of the university branch of Noregs Mållag; in 1911 and the autumn of 1913. He was also a member of the Norwegian Language Council, representing Nynorsk writers.

Eik-Nes was married to teacher Nina Eik-Nes, née Nina Lange Dahler (1900–1997), and was the father of hormone researcher Kristen Eik-Nes. Through his daughter Eli, born 1921, he was a father-in-law of Magne Oftedal.

Eik-Nes was decorated with the Royal Norwegian Order of St. Olav, and a memorial stone at Mære was raised by Noregs Ungdomslag local associations on 17 May 1970. He died in January 1968.

Cultural offices
Preceded by Halvdan Wexelsen Freihow	Chairman of Noregs Ungdomslag; 1936–1947	Succeeded by Vegard Sletten
