= Freihow =

Freihow is a surname. Notable people with the surname include:

- Halvdan Wexelsen Freihow (1883–1965), Norwegian priest
- Håkon Wexelsen Freihow (1927–2019), Norwegian diplomat
- Halfdan W. Freihow (born 1959), Norwegian literary critic, novelist, editor, and book publisher
