= Stavrum =

Stavrum is a surname. Notable people with the surname include:

- Arild Stavrum (born 1972), Norwegian football coach and former player
- Gunnar Stavrum (born 1961), Norwegian newspaper editor and author
- Kjersti Løken Stavrum (born 1969), Norwegian journalist and editor
- Martin Stavrum (1938–2022), Norwegian politician
- Ole Erik Stavrum (born 1966), Norwegian former footballer
