= Nina Eik-Nes =

Norwegian politician (1900–1997)

Nina Eik-Nes, née Nina Lange Dahler (5 January 1900 – 22 May 1997) was a Norwegian politician for the Liberal Party.

She served as a deputy representative to the Norwegian Parliament from Nord-Trøndelag during the terms 1945–1949 and 1950–1953. She lived in Sparbu at the time. She was a prominent member of the Norwegian Women's Public Health Association, especially during World War II. Among others, she helped set up a field hospital at Mære School of Agriculture during the Norwegian Campaign. The field hospital was not used as such, but the equipment was stored, secretly kept away from German occupying forces by Eik-Nes and portioned out later. The work of Eik-Nes and her organization became especially important in 1944, when the liberation of Northern Norway and the Wehrmacht's subsequent scorched earth tactic meant that thousands of people fled south, needing help from the Women's Public Health Association.

She was married to priest and cultural worker Knut Eik-Nes (1900–1997), and was the mother of hormone researcher Kristen Dahler Eik-Nes. Through her daughter Eli, born 1921, she was a mother-in-law of Magne Oftedal.
