= Wexelsen =

Wexelsen is a surname. Notable people with the surname include:

- Håkon Wexelsen (1898–1979), Norwegian plant geneticist
- Håkon Wexelsen Freihow (born 1927), Norwegian diplomat
- Halvdan Wexelsen Freihow (1883–1965), Norwegian priest and culturist
- Marie Wexelsen (1832–1911), Norwegian poet, children's writer and novelist
- Vilhelm Andreas Wexelsen (1849–1909), Norwegian bishop and politician for the Liberal Party
