= Halfdan (name) =

Halfdan ("half Dane") is an Old Norse masculine given name. In Beowulf it is spelled Healfdene, and in Latin sources Haldan. It may refer to:

Mythical figures:

- Halfdan, legendary king of the Scyldings in Beowulf, who also appears in Norse mythology
- Halfdan the Old, ancient legendary king
- Halfdan Hvitbeinn, mythical petty king in Norway
- Halfdan the Valiant (7th century), legendary father of Ivar Vidfamne
- Hálfdan Brönufostri, subject of the legendary saga Hálfdanar saga Brönufóstra
- Halfdan Eysteinsson, subject of the legendary saga Hálfdanar saga Eysteinssonar

People:

- Halfdan (floruit 782–807), Danish client of the Franks
- Halfdan the Black (c. 820 – c. 860), father of Harald I of Norway
- Halfdan Ragnarsson (died 877), Viking, leader of the Great Heathen Army
- Halfdan, possible name of the author of an inscription on a Hagia Sofia parapet
- Halfdan Haraldsson the Black, Norwegian petty king and grandson of Halfdan the Black
- Halfdan, a joint King of Northumbria (reigned 902–910) – see Eowils and Halfdan
- Halfdan the Mild, son of King Eystein Halfdansson, of the House of Yngling
- Halfdan Bryn (1864–1933), Norwegian physician and physical anthropologist
- Halfdan Christensen (1873–1950), Norwegian stage actor and theatre director
- Halfdan Olaus Christophersen (1902–1980), Norwegian historian of ideas, non-fiction writer and World War II resistance member
- Halfdan E (born 1965), Danish film and television composer
- Halfdan Egedius (1877–1899), Norwegian painter and illustrator
- Halfdan Wexel Freihow (born 1959), Norwegian literary critic, novelist, editor and book publisher
- Halfdan Hegtun (1918–2012), Norwegian radio personality, comedian and writer, and politician
- Halfdan Holth (1880–1950), Norwegian veterinarian and professor
- Halfdan Jønsson (1891–1945), Norwegian trade unionist and World War II resistance member
- Halfdan Kjerulf (1815–1868), Norwegian composer
- Halfdan Lehmann (1825–1908), Norwegian government official
- Halfdan T. Mahler (1923–2016), Danish medical doctor and three-term director-general of the World Health Organization
- Halfdan Nielsen (1874-1952), Norwegian speedskater who set the world record in the 10,000 m in 1893
- Halfdan Rasmussen (1915–2002), Danish poet
- Halfdan Strøm (1863–1949), Norwegian painter
- Halfdan Sundt (1873–1951), Norwegian physician and politician
- Hálfdán Matthíasson (born 2003), member of Væb
