= Sletta =

Sletta may refer to:

== Places ==
- Sletta, Norway, a village in Østre Toten municipality, Innlandet county, Norway
- Sletta, Troms, a village in Balsfjord municipality, Troms county, Norway
- Sletta, Vestland, a village in Alver municipality, Vestland county, Norway
- Sletta Church (Frøya), a church in Frøya municipality, Trøndelag county, Norway
- Emigrant Church, Sletta, a church in Alver municipality, Vestland county, Norway

== See also ==
- Sletten
