= Vegard Sletten =

Norwegian newspaper editor (1907–1984)

Vegard Sletten (8 May 1907 – 17 December 1984) was a Norwegian newspaper editor. He worked in Stavanger Aftenblad from 1929 to 1945, except for the World War II years during parts of which he was imprisoned, and then in Verdens Gang from 1945. He edited the latter newspaper from 1967 to 1977, and chaired both the Norwegian Union of Journalists and the Norwegian Press Association. Like his father Klaus Sletten he was also a Nynorsk supporter.

== Early and personal life ==
Sletten was born in Kristiania as a son of newspaper editor Klaus Daae Sletten (1877–1946) and Margit Bruun (1875–1958). He was a nephew of Jakob Hveding Sletten and a maternal grandson of Christopher Bruun. From Kristiania his family soon moved to Stavanger via Trondhjem and Ålesund. He finished his secondary education in Stavanger in 1925, and studied at the University of Oslo, the University of Paris and the École des hautes études en sciences sociales between 1925 and 1928. He was hired as a journalist in Stavanger Aftenblad in 1929. In 1933 he married Synnøve Erika Gudmundson (1909–2001).

== World War II ==
In 1940, Norway was invaded and occupied by Germany as a part of World War II. Nazification attempts of the press soon began, and when a member of the Fascist party Nasjonal Samling was installed in Stavanger Aftenblad in 1941, Sletten quit his job. He then worked part-time as a teacher, as well as in the illegal press. He was arrested in Stavanger in June 1944, and spent time in Grini concentration camp from June 1944 to February 1945. He was then detained in Berg concentration camp until the liberation of Norway, which incidentally took place on his birthday.

== Post-war career ==
After the war, Sletten returned to his old job in Stavanger Aftenblad, but quit after a few months, following a dispute over the appointment of Christian S. Oftedal as editor-in-chief. Instead, he was hired by the newly established Verdens Gang in the autumn of 1945. He worked there parallel to editing the weekly newspaper Norsk Tidend, from 1946 to 1975, and chairing the trade union Norwegian Union of Journalists from 1946 to 1949 and 1952 to 1956. He helped co-found this trade union. In the Norwegian Press Association he was deputy chair from 1947 to 1951 and chair from 1962 to 1971. From 1962 to 1964 he was a board member of the International Federation of Journalists.

Sletten became chief editor of Verdens Gang in 1967, and sat until his old age retirement in 1977. The newspaper had multiple chief editors at this time. Sletten replaced founding editor Christian A. R. Christensen, and co-edited with Oskar Hasselknippe, who had held the position since 1953. Between 1969 and 1974 Arne Bonde sat as a third editor. Hasselknippe and Sletten were succeeded by Tim Greve and Andreas Norland. During Sletten's period as editor Verdens Gang developed into one of Norway's leading newspapers, more or less trebling its circulation. In 1981 it surpassed Aftenposten to become Norway's largest newspaper.

Sletten also chaired the Nynorsk organization Noregs Ungdomslag from 1947 to 1955, following in the footsteps of his father. He was also a member of the Norwegian Language Council and of the board of the Norwegian Agency for Development Cooperation. As a pensioner he wrote Pressestøtte og pressefridom ('Press Support and Freedom of the Press', 1979), a book about the Norwegian press support. He also biographed Christopher Bruun in 1986; in 1964 he had issued a collection of Bruun's letters. He was decorated as a Knight, First Class of the Royal Norwegian Order of St. Olav and of the Order of the Lion of Finland. He died in December 1984 in Oslo.

Media offices
Preceded by position created	Chairman of the Norwegian Union of Journalists; 1946–1949	Succeeded by A. Skjegstad
Preceded by A. Skjegstad	Chairman of the Norwegian Union of Journalists; 1956–1962	Succeeded by Ivar Johansen
Preceded by Christian A. R. Christensen	Chairman of the Norwegian Press Association; 1962–1971	Succeeded by
Cultural offices
Preceded by Knut Eik-Nes	Chairman of Noregs Ungdomslag; 1947–1955	Succeeded by Knut Hauge
