= Adolf Skjegstad =

Norwegian journalist

Adolf Skjegstad, who usually called himself A. Skjegstad (11 October 1902 – 27 February 1988) was a Norwegian journalist.

He was born in Løten Municipality as a son of Kristian Olsen Skjegstad (1871–1959) and Marie Krog Borchgrevink (1873–1954). He had five brothers and two sisters, mostly younger than he was. He married Petra Røhne (1903–1984), and they had two sons and one daughter. They celebrated their gold wedding anniversary in 1983.

He began his journalistic career in 1917 in Østerdalens Arbeiderblad. He later worked in Demokraten, and was involved in the labour movement. In 1923, when the Young Communist League constituted itself as youth wing of the Communist Party, he was a board member of the Hedmark branch. He later became one of the few to go from a labour newspaper to a high-profile bourgeois and conservative newspaper, in his case Aftenposten. He was a sports journalist, and contributed with a chapter about sports in Eyvind Lillevold's history of Hamar, Hamars historie, in 1949. He was also the editor of Hamar IL's club newspaper in 1928, but this soon went defunct. He especially covered speed skating and orienteering. Representing Hamar IL, he was a board member of the Norwegian Skating Association from 1951 to 1952 and vice president from 1952 to 1953. He also took up active orienteering around the age of 70, and continued well into his 80s. He had co-arranged the first orienteering event held in Hedemarken, in 1934, where the orienteering map was in the scale 1:100,000.

In addition to sports he covered economical and political topics, especially forestry. Books include Norsk journalistlag gjennom 25 år about the Norwegian Union of Journalists in 1971, Skogbruk i Hedmark: Hedmark skogselskap 1901–1976 in 1976, Østlendingen about the newspaper Østlendingen in 1976, Skogeierforeningenes faglige virksomhet gjennom 25 år in 1978 and Norske eggcentraler S/L 50 år: 1929–1979 in 1979. He chaired the Norwegian Union of Journalists from 1949 to 1956, and was a board member of the Norwegian Press Association. He edited the journalism magazine Journalisten from 1962 to 1973. He was decorated with the Norwegian Forestry Society diploma and the Norwegian Press Association honorary badge.

He died in February 1988, and was buried in Hamar in March.

Media offices
Preceded by Vegard Sletten	Chairman of the Norwegian Union of Journalists; 1949–1956	Succeeded by Vegard Sletten
