= Sletten =

Sletten is a surname. Notable people with the surname include:

- Finn Sletten (born 1952), Norwegian jazz musician
- Iver Sletten (born 1974), Norwegian footballer
- Jakob Hveding Sletten (1872–1936), Norwegian priest and musician
- Klaus Sletten (1877–1946), Norwegian organizational worker and politician
- Olaf Sletten (1886–1943), Norwegian shooter
- Vegard Sletten (1907–1984), Norwegian newspaper editor
- Paige VanZant, born Paige Sletten, (1994), MMA fighter and professional wrestler, maiden name was Sletten.

== See also ==
- Sletten Township, Polk County, Minnesota
