= Gunnar Gran =

Norwegian media executive (1931–2016)

- Born: 11 July 1931; Ålesund, Norway
- Died: 12 June 2016 (aged 84)

Gunnar Gran (11 July 1931 – 12 June 2016) was a Norwegian media executive.

He was born in Ålesund as a son of Wilhelm Ernst Ramm Gran (1890–1979) and Marit Mogstad (1896–1982). He was married twice, the second time to Kari Fougner, an older sister of Else Bugge Fougner. He finished his secondary education in Oslo in 1950 and started philology studies. He was hired in the Norwegian News Agency in 1952, Aftenposten in 1961 and the Norwegian Broadcasting Corporation in 1967. He was a subeditor in the radio newscast Dagsnytt, later promoted to editor. He was the director of radio from 1981 to 1986. Norway had only one radio channel until 1984, when NRK P2 was opened. As such a new director was hired for P2, while Gran continued as director of NRK P1 only.

Gran was then the chief executive officer of Aftenposten from 1986 to 1990, also chairing the employers' organization Avisenes Arbeidsgiverforening from 1987 to 1990. He was the secretary-general of the Norwegian Press Association from 1990 to 1996 (acting until 1992), then the secretary-general of the Norway-America Association from 1996 and the Norse Federation from 1999 to 2001.

He published the books Media in Norway (1999), the memoirs Men radioen var ikke død (2000) and Til Kjølen skilte oss. Unionsoppløsningen i svensk og norsk presse.

He resided in Blindern.

Media offices
Preceded by Halfdan Hegtun	Director of radio in the Norwegian Broadcasting Corporation; 1981–1986 (from 1983 of NRK P1)	Succeeded by Olav Nilssen
Preceded by Gunnar Wille	Chief executive of Aftenposten; 1986–1990	Succeeded by Kjell Aamot (acting)
Preceded by Hans Andreas Ihlebæk	Secretary-general of the Norwegian Press Association; 1990–1996	Succeeded by Per Edgar Kokkvold
