= Humlebæk Church =

Coordinates: 55°58′18″N 12°32′32″E

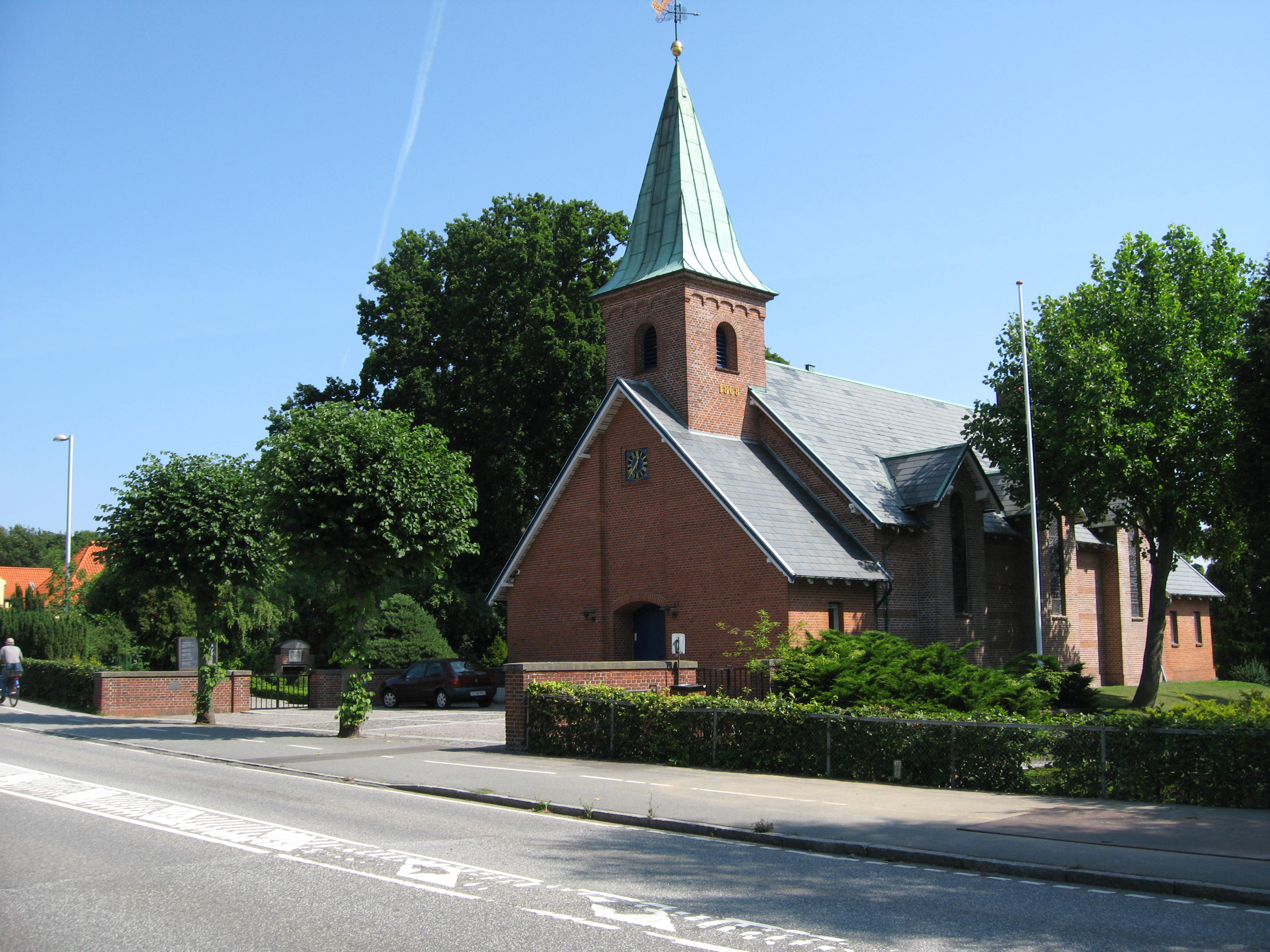
Humlebæk Church

Humlebæk Church (Danish: Humlebæk Kirke) is a parish church in Humlebæk, Fredensborg Municipality, som 20 km north of central Copenhagen, Denmark.

== History ==
Humlebæk was originally located in the vast Asminderød Parish. A chaplain conducted outdoor services for the residents of Humlebæk and Sletten in Lave Skov and at Sletten School. A group of residents from Asminderød, Grønholt and Fredensborg starting working for a new church in Humlebæk in 1866. Ballet master August Bournonville was a member of the committee and chamberlain C. Brun from Krogerup provided a piece of land and also contributed financially to the project. The architect Frederik Vilhelm Tvede was charged with the design of the new church. The foundation stone was set on 13 June 1868 in the presence of Christian IX and the completed church was already inaugurated on 20 December the same year. The church was initially referred to as "Capellet" (The chapel).

The church was on the night between 18 and 18 December 1898 hit by fire. The fire was put out by local fishermen and people from Krogerup. It was badly damaged but reopened on 22 October 1899.

== Architecture ==
The church is built in red brick in Byzantine style. The nave and chancel have barrel vaulted ceilings.

== Furnishings ==
The altar was created by E. Zeuthen Nielsen in 1868. A glass mosaic by Sven Havsteen Mikkelsen representing the battle of light against darkness is located behind the altar. The old altarpiece, an 1868 painting by A. Dorph depicting Christ on the cross, is now located to the north of the altar.

The baptismal font was created in 1846 by H. Dalhoff for the Church of the Holy Ghost in Copenhagen. It was donated to Humlebæk Church in 1895. The votive ship, a 12-gun naval brig, was donated to the church by fisherman and diver Jens Jensen in connection with its inauguration in 1868. The current organ was built by Carsten Lund in 1997.

== Churchyard ==
Notable burials in the surrounding churchyard include:

- Charles Brun (1866–1919), politician
- Eske Brun (1904–1987), civil servant n
- Fritz Brun (1813–1888), politician and landowner
- Ebba Carstensen (1885–1967), painter
- Urban Gad (1879–1947), filmmaker
- Viggo Jarl (1879–1965), sculptor
- Knud W. Jensen (1916–2000), businessman and museum founder
- Ole Kielberg (1911–1985), painter
- Knud Kristensen (1880–1962), politician
- Erik Moltke (1901–1983), writer and runologist
- Elna Møller (1912–1994), architect and editor
- Jens Rosing (1925–2008), illustrator and author
- Kristian Vedel (1923–2003), designer
- Peter Zobel (1936–2017), businessman
