= Ivar Johansen (journalist) =

Norwegian journalist and editor

Ivar Johansen (1923–2005) was a Norwegian journalist and editor.

He was the chairman of the trade union Norwegian Union of Journalists from 1962 to 1964. From August to September 1963, during the short-lived cabinet Lyng, Johansen was a State Secretary in the Office of the Prime Minister.

He was a journalist in Stavanger Aftenblad from 1964 to 1972, worked as news editor in the Norwegian Broadcasting Corporation from 1973 to 1980 and as chief editor in the Norwegian News Agency from 1980 to 1989.

He was also a member of the board of the Norwegian Press Association and the Norwegian Journalist College, and was a member of the Pressens Faglige Utvalg and Kringkastingsrådet.

Media offices
| Preceded by Vegard Sletten | Chairman of the Norwegian Union of Journalists; 1962–1964 | Succeeded by Trygve Moe |
