= Peter Slotsvik =

Norwegian newspaper editor

Peter Joachim Kristian Slotsvik (3 February 1862 – 20 September 1924) was a Norwegian newspaper editor and fiction writer.

He was born in Ålesund. He co-founded Noregs Ungdomslag in 1896 and served as its first chairman until 1899. He then edited the newspaper Indre Smaalenenes Avis from 1900 to his death. He also wrote books such as Storfossen (1909), Utpaa stupe (1910), Brita-Lars (1912) and Brukseigaren (1922).

Cultural offices
Preceded by position created	Chairman of Noregs Ungdomslag; 1896–1899	Succeeded by Sven Moren
