= Ihlebæk =

Ihlebæk is a Norwegian surname. Notable people with the surname include:

- Hans Andreas Ihlebæk (1930–1993), Norwegian journalist
- Oscar Ihlebæk (1900–1945), Norwegian newspaper editor and resistance member
