= Asminderød Church =

Coordinates: 55°58′06″N 12°24′30″E

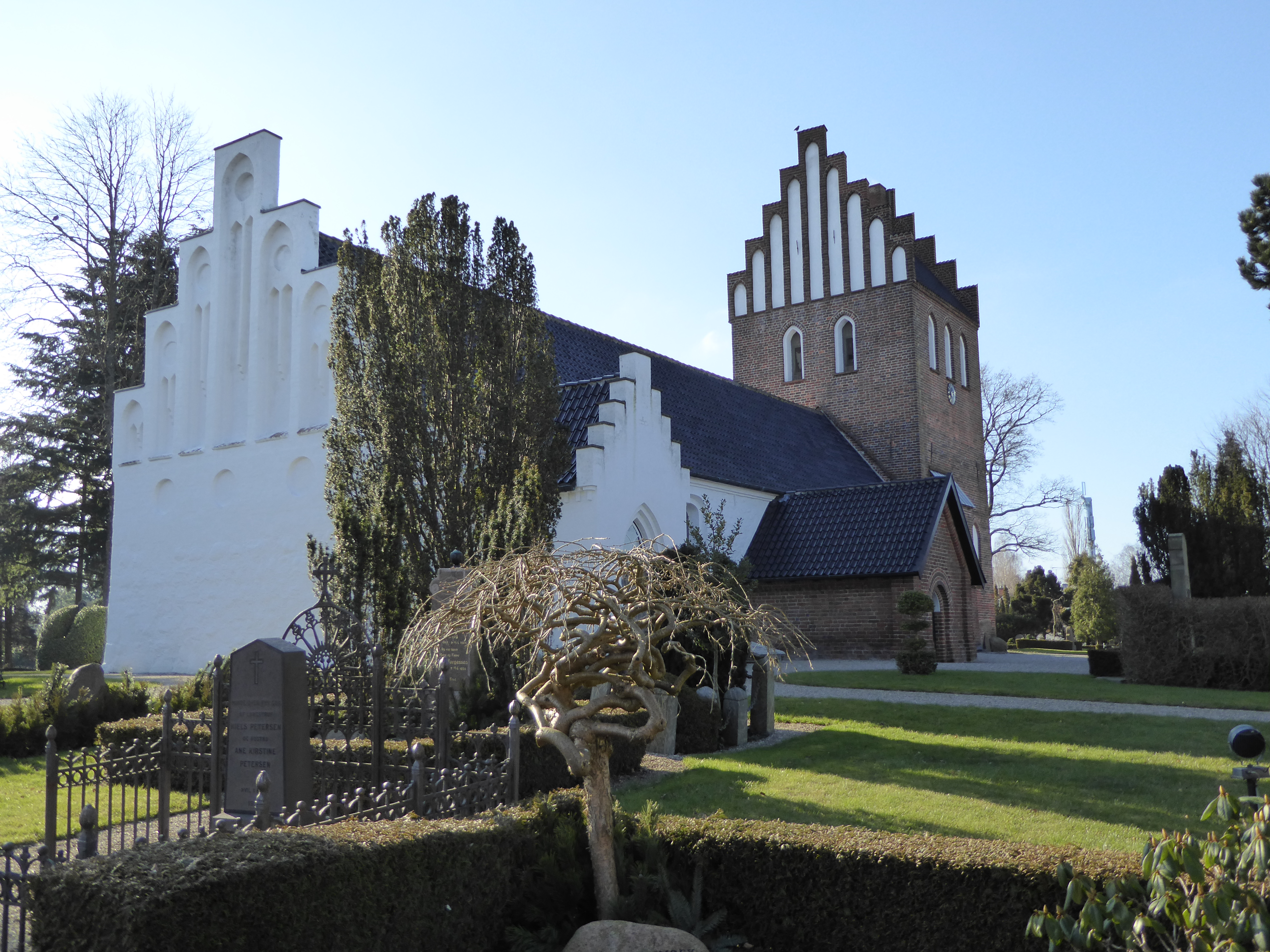
Asminderød Church

Asminderød Church (Danish: Asminderød Kirke) is a parish church in Asminderød, now part of Fredensborg, Fredensborg Municipality som 40 km north of central Copenhagen, Denmark.

== History ==
A small Romanesque church was built at the site in the first half of the 12th century. It was later in the century expanded westwards. The thick granite walls indicate that they may already then have carried a tower. The current tower and the cross vaulted ceiling of the nave date from the 15th century. The porch on the north side of the church was constructed in the first half of the 13th century and the chancel was expanded to its current size in around 1500. The southern side nave was constructed in brick in 1736. The small sacristy was added in 1839.

== Interior and furnishings ==
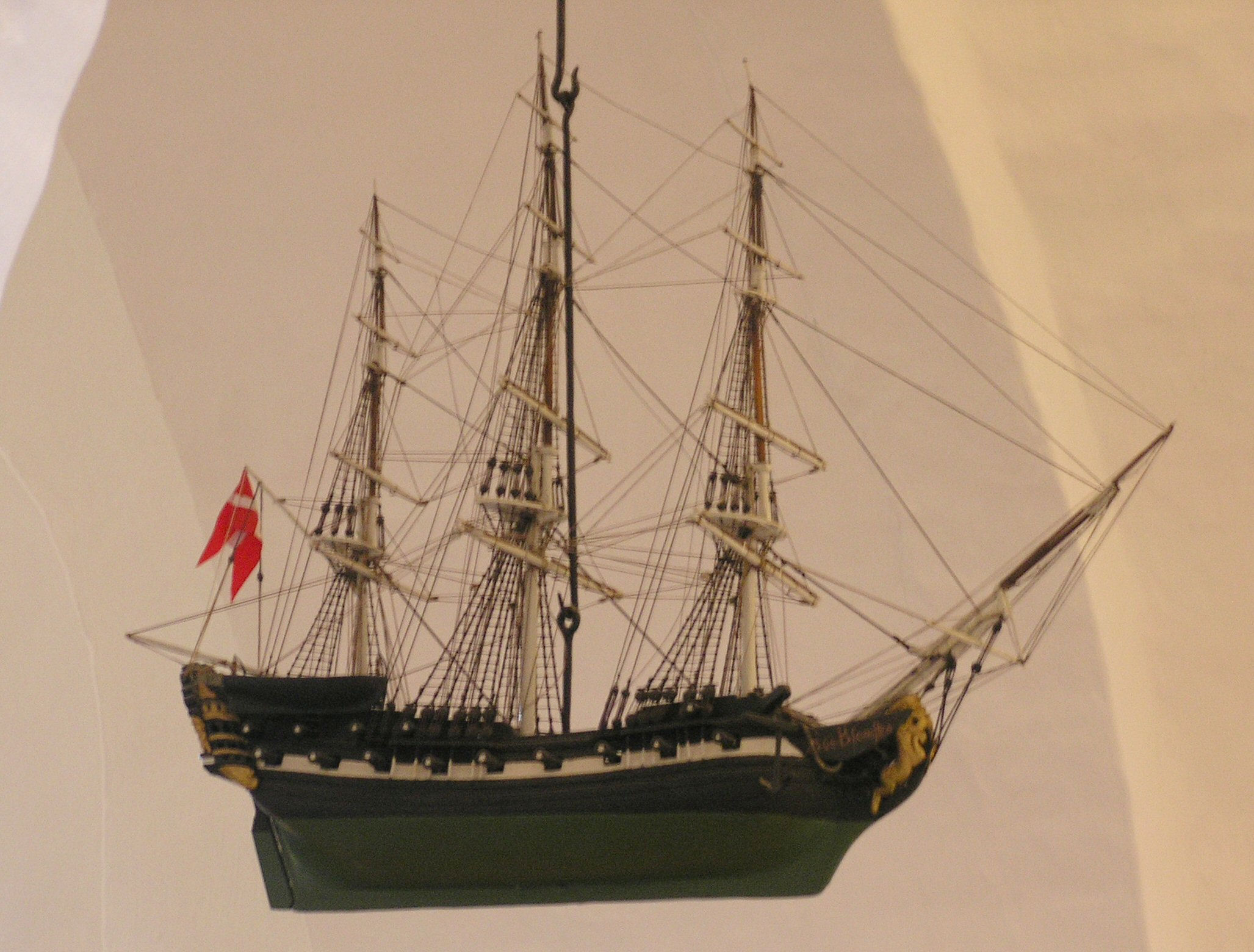
Sæe-Blomsten

The pulpit dates from the late 16th century, save the canopy which is from c. 1630. The pews are partly from the same period as the pulpit and partly constructed to a similar design in 1736. The south wall of the side nave features a crucifix from c. 1500.

The church contains two votive ships. The elder of them, a model of the naval ship Søe Blomsten, dates from the second half of the 18th century. The other one, Anna Catharina a naval brig, is from 1820.

== Churchyard ==
The church is surrounded by a churchyard. Notable burials include:

- Antoine Bournonville (1760-1843), ballet master
- August Bournonville (1805-1879), ballet master
- Charlotte Bournonville (1822-1911), actress and singer
- Marie Hammer (1907-2002), zoologist
- Meta Hansen (1865–1941), suffragist
- Edvard Helsted (1715-1900), composer
- Ludvig Kabell (1853-1902), painter
- Frederik Paludan-Müller (1809-1876), author
- Sophie Pedersen (1885-1950), painter
- Johanne Rosing (1758-1853), actress
- Rudolph Rothe (1802-1877), landscape architect
- Charles Shaw (1845-1918)
- Hans Tegner (1853-1932), illustrator
- Francis Zachariae (1852-1936), businessman, publisher and philanthropist

== See also ==
- Humlebæk Church
