= Marie Hammer =

Danish zoologist (1907–2002)

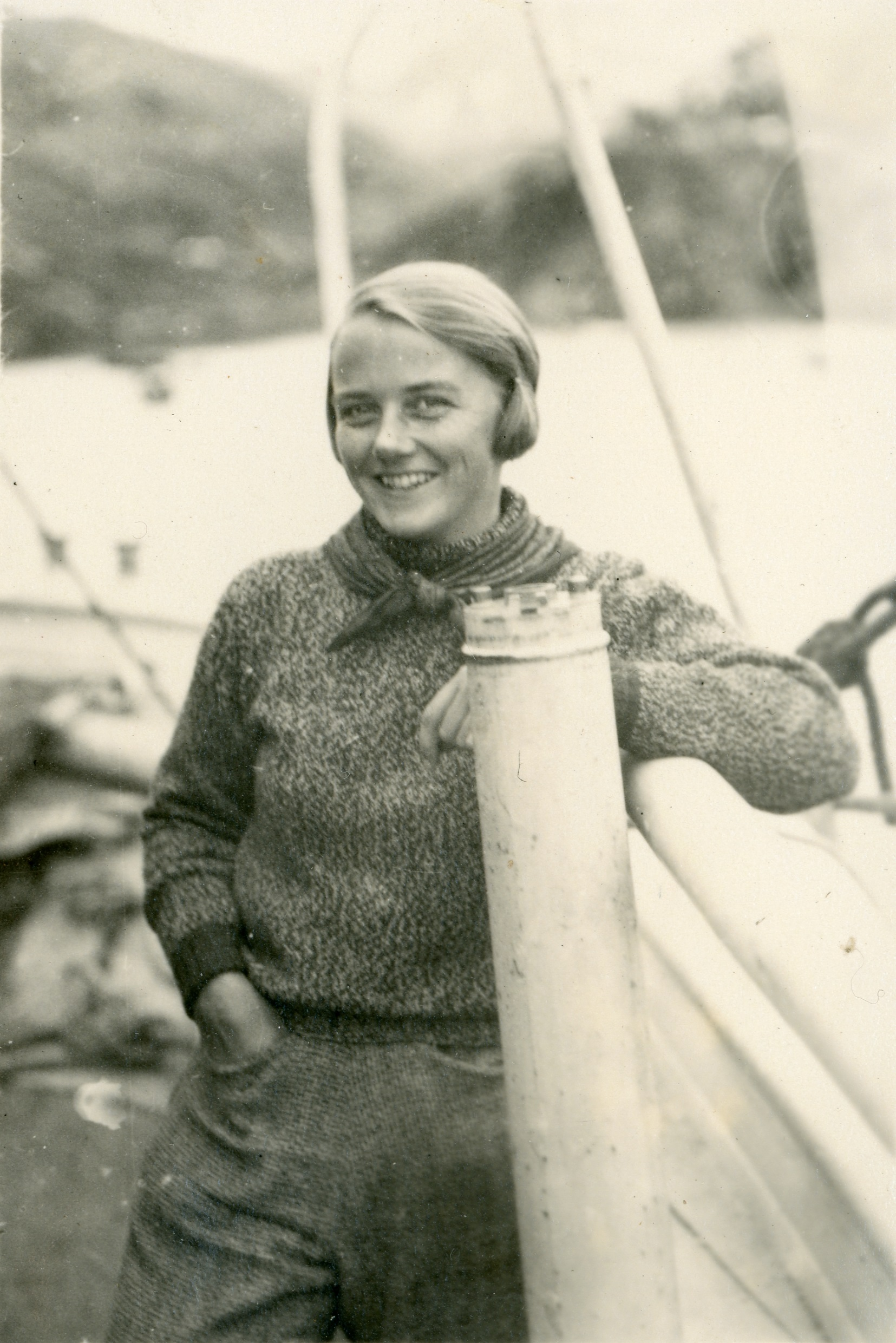
- Born: Marie Signe Jørgensen; 20 March 1907; Copenhagen, Denmark
- Died: 25 May 2002 (aged 95)
- Education: University of Copenhagen
- Known for: research on moss mites
- Notable work: Forsker i fem verdensdele
- Spouse: Ole Hammer
- Scientific career
- Fields: entomology; zoology

Marie Signe Hammer née Jørgensen (1907–2002) was a Danish zoologist and entomologist who specialized in moss mites. In the 1930s and 1940s, she undertook research in Iceland, the Faroe Islands and Greenland. She later extended her investigations to North and South America, New Zealand, and Asia, discovering some 150 new genera and almost a thousand new species. Her research supported the dispersal of species as a result of continental drift as described in her 1979 thesis together with John Anthony Wallwork titled A Review of the World Distribution of oribatid mites in Relation to Continental Drift.

== Early life ==
Born in Copenhagen on 20 March 1907, Jørgensen was the daughter of Niels Rasmussen Jørgensen and Alma Kristine Rasmussen. After her parents had divorced when she was seven, she was brought up by her mother on a farm in Nivå. After matriculating from Rungsted State School in 1926, she studied zoology at the University of Copenhagen, earning a master's degree in 1932.

== Career ==
A publication by C.H. Bornebusch in 1930 on The Fauna of Forest Soil inspired Jørgensen to research the new field of microfauna in soils. This led to a trip to Iceland in 1931 with her twin sister Aase, reported in their Island rundt in 1935. In 1933, with a view to extending her research to Greenland, she joined Knud Rasmussen on his final Thule expedition. She studied microfauna, in particular springtails (Collembola) and moss mites (Oribatida), documenting her discoveries in later publications.

On 9 October 1936, she married fellow zoology student Ole Gregers Hammer (1911–1996) who later headed Danish beekeeping research. In the 1930s and 1940s, Marie Hammer collaborated with Statens Vildtbiologiske Undersøgelser (Danish Wildlife Investigations), conducting work on sparrows. Together they had four children: Karen (1938), Inga (1941), Birgitte (1942), Peder (1946).

In the late 1940s, she once again embarked on lengthy expeditions to continue her research on moss mites, travelling to Canada, Alaska and the Rocky Mountains (1948), Mexico, Argentina, Chile and Bolivia (1954), Panama, Ecuador, Peru, Chile and Argentina (1957), Hawaii, Fiji, New Zealand and New Guinea (1962), West Pakistan, Indonesia, Tonga, Western Samoa and Tahita (1969) and finally Java and Bali (1973).

These expeditions led to papers on 150 new genera and almost a thousand new species. As a result of her research, she became convinced that animal dispersion was a result of continental drift, first presenting her findings in a paper on Mucronothrus nasalis in 1965. Together with John A. Wallwork, she described the development of 696 general in the context of continental movement over the past 200 million years in A Review of the World Distribution of oribatid mites in Relation to Continental Drift (1979).

In 1982, Hammer was awarded Weekendavisen literature prize for her book Forsker i fem verdensdele (Researcher in Five Continents) in which she describes her travels, her work on moss mites and the people she met. Commenting on how little she had earned from her life's work, she explained: "50 years for Minerva. Despite this paltry financial result, I would not swap my life with anyone — I have obtained what I wanted and lived my life in my own way."

Marie Hammer and her husband spent their later life in an old farmhouse near Fredensborg. She died on 25 May 2002 and is buried in Fredensborg's Asminderød Cemetery.

A biographical novel based on the life and endeavours of Marie Hammer was published in 2021 by Danish author Eva Tind entitled "Kvinden der samlede verden" ("The woman who assembled the world") referring to continental drift after the former supercontinent, Pangaea, and her scientific support of this theory.
