= Sigmund Moren =

Norwegian philologist and critic (1913–1996)

Sigmund Moren (27 November 1913 – 4 February 1996) was a Norwegian philologist, encyclopedist, literary critic, theatre critic and children's writer.

== Biography ==
Moren grew up in Trysil Municipality in Hedmark county. His father was writer Sven Moren (1871–1938). He was a brother of poet, translator and author Halldis Moren Vesaas (1907–1995). He was educated at the University of Oslo. He worked for Gyldendal Norsk Forlag and later as rector of Elverum Folk High School from 1956.

He was also a critic for the newspaper, Østlendingen. He debuted as a children's book author and won the Dammprisen in 1953. Among his children's books were Dimmi får venner from 1952, and Nattegjester på Jonsvangen from 1957.
