= Hans Andreas Ihlebæk =

Norwegian journalist

Hans Andreas Ihlebæk (16 October 1930 – 2 July 1993) was a Norwegian journalist.

He started his career working in Rana Blad, Bergens Arbeiderblad and Vestfold Arbeiderblad between 1957 and 1965. After seven years at the Norwegian Journalist School, he became the secretary-general of the Norwegian Press Association in 1972. He stepped down in 1990, having made his mark on the debate about journalism ethics and standards.

Media offices
Preceded by	Secretary-general of the Norwegian Press Association; 1972–1990	Succeeded by Gunnar Gran
