= Rudolph Rothe =

Danish landscape architect

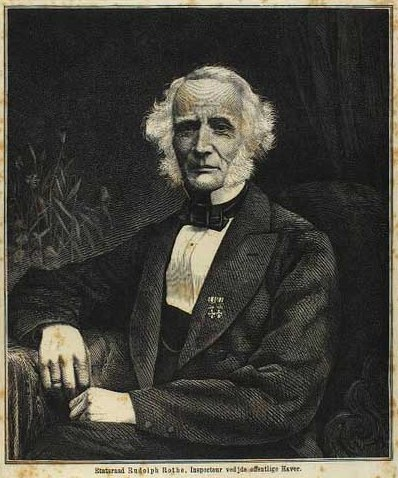
Rudolph Rothe

Rudolph Rothe (18 October 1802 – 30 January 1877) was a Danish landscape architect who was awarded the high-ranking title of etatsråd for his achievements. Talented in both the practical and theoretical aspects of landscape gardening, he exerted considerable influence on the development of the art in Denmark.

== Early life ==
After apprenticeships in Frederiksberg Park and Rosenborg Gardens, he took the gardening examination in 1821. He became assistant gardener in Copenhagen's Botanical Garden (1821–1823) before qualifying in botany and botanical gardening in 1823.

== Career ==
From 1828 to 1833, he performed the duties both of private secretary and palace gardener for A.W. Moltke at Bregentved. He was later employed as landscape architect at Fredensborg Palace (1833–1849). He also contributed to the development of Søndermarken. In addition to many publications, he was instrumental in founding the association Selskabet til Haveculturens Fremme (Society for the Future of Gardening) in 1834 and was also active in the company which launched the magazine Have-Tidende (Garden Times, 1835–1843), Denmark's first gardening periodical.

== Personal life ==
He died on 30 January 1877 and is buried in Asminderød Cemetery in Fredensborg.

== Culture canon ==
Rothe is listed in the Danish Culture Canon in connection with Jægersborg Dyrehave.
