= Runic inscriptions in Hagia Sophia =

Runic inscriptions that are left in Hagia Sophia

- Exterior view of the Hagia Sophia, 2013

General Information
- Material: Marble
- Inscription type: Parapets
- Script: Runic
- Language: Old Norse
- Translation: Variations of "Halfdan/Árni made these runes"
- Dimensions: 23 centimetres (9.1 in) (Halfdan), 24 millimetres (0.94 in) (Árni) lengths, 1.5–5 centimetres (0.59–1.97 in) character heights

Discovery
- Place found: Hagia Sophia, Istanbul, Turkey
- Date discovered: 1964, 1975
- Date created: 9th – 11th centuries

Contents of the Inscription
- Author: Members of the Varangian Guard
- Names of people mentioned: Halfdan, Árni

Location and Status

There are at least two runic inscriptions in Hagia Sophia's marble parapets. They may have been engraved by members of the Varangian Guard in Constantinople during the Viking Age.

== The Halfdan inscription ==
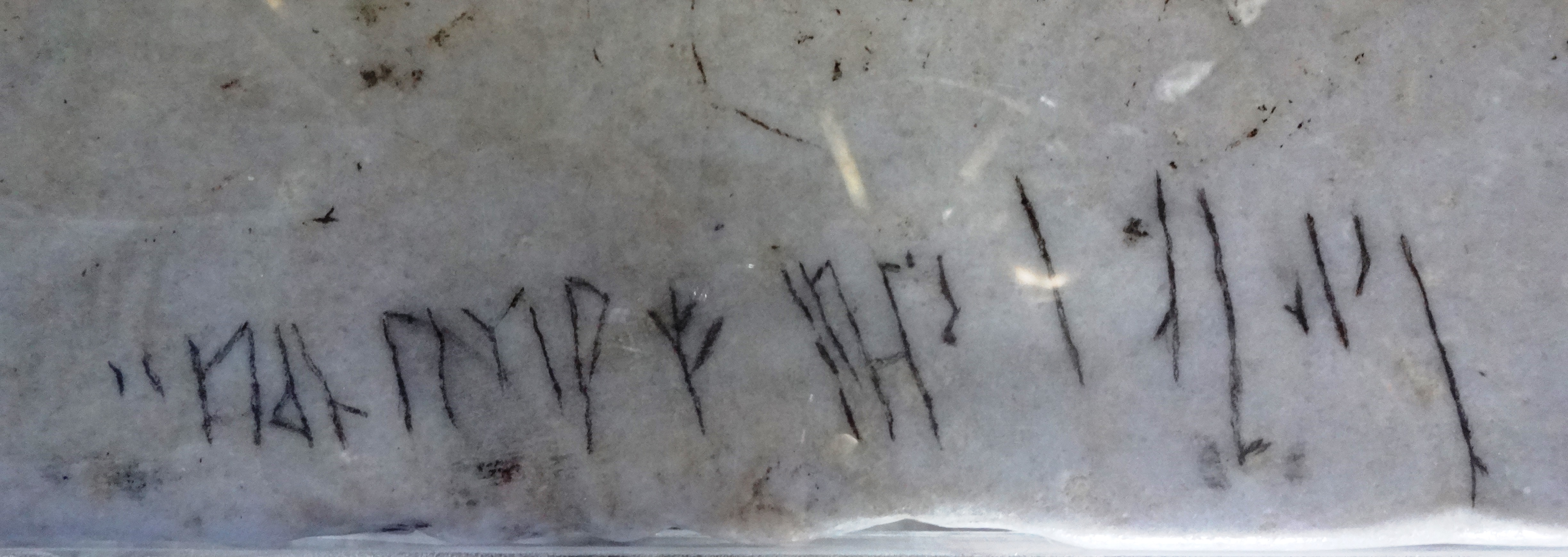
The "Halfdan inscription" - 2014

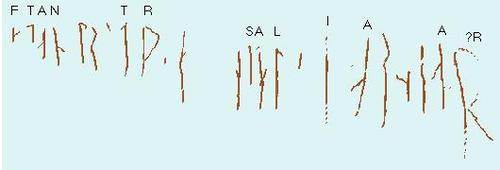
Transcription of the recognizable Halfdan runes

The first runic inscription was discovered in 1964 on a parapet on the top floor of the southern gallery, and the discovery was published by Elisabeth Svärdström in "Runorna i Hagia Sofia", Fornvännen 65 (1970), 247–49. The inscription is worn down so nowadays only -ftan, which is the Norse name Halfdan, is legible. The remainder of the inscription is considered to be illegible, but it is possible that it followed the common formula "NN carved these runes".

== The second inscription ==
A second inscription was discovered by Folke Högberg from Uppsala in 1975. It was discovered in a niche in the northern part of the same gallery as the first inscription. The discovery was reported to the Department of Runes in Stockholm in 1984, but it was not published. The archaeologist Mats G. Larsson discovered the runes anew in 1988 and published the find in "Nyfunna runor i Hagia Sofia", Fornvännen 84 (1989), 12–14. He read ari:k and interpreted it as a possible "Ári m(ade)" or "Ári m(ade the runes)". Because of the uncertainty in the reading, the inscription was not registered in the periodical Nytt om runer 4 of 1989.

Högberg had made a different reading from Larsson in 1975, and this reading was supported by Svein Indrelid, a professor of archaeology at the University of Bergen, in 1997. The reading of Högberg and Indrelid is the man's name Árni and they consider the inscription to be pure graffiti, unlike Larsson. Larsson learnt of Högberg's interpretation in 1989, but he defended his own interpretation.

== More inscriptions ==
Professor Indrelid made copies of five possible runic inscriptions on the parapet and he handed them over to the Norwegian Runic archive in 1997. There may be additional runic inscriptions waiting to be found on the walls and other parts of the Hagia Sophia.

== See also ==
- Berezan' Runestone
- Greece runestones
- Italy runestones
- List of runestones
- Piraeus Lion

== Sources ==
- James E. Knirk, Runer i Hagia Sofia i Istanbul, Nytt om runer 14 (1999), 26–27 (archived).
- Relics Of The Varangians – Grafitti in Hagia Sophia. (with pictures).
