= Nikolaus Gjelsvik =

Norwegian jurist and law professor (1866–1938)

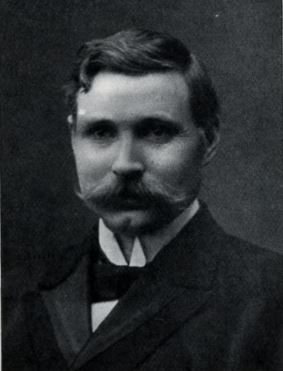
- Born: 11 April 1866; Vevring, Norway
- Died: 14 November 1938 (aged 72)
- Occupation: Jurist

Nikolaus Gjelsvik (11 April 1866 –14 November 1938) was a Norwegian jurist and law professor.

He was born at Vevring Municipality in Sunnfjord. He served as a professor at the University of Kristiania (now University of Oslo) from 1906.

Among his works are the books Innleiding i rettsstudiet from 1912, Lærebok i folkerett from 1915, and Lærebok i millomfolkeleg privatrett from 1918. He was a proponent for the Nynorsk language, took part in organisational work, and had leading positions in the publishing house Det Norske Samlaget and in the societies Noregs Ungdomslag and Noregs Mållag.

Marshals at his funeral were Nicolai Rygg and Ferdinand Schjelderup.

Cultural offices
Preceded by Klaus Sletten	Chairman of Noregs Ungdomslag; 1906–1915	Succeeded by Sven Moren
Preceded by Jørgen Løvland	Chairman of Noregs Mållag; 1912–1915	Succeeded by Fredrik Voss
