= Charlotte Bournonville =

Danish opera singer and actress

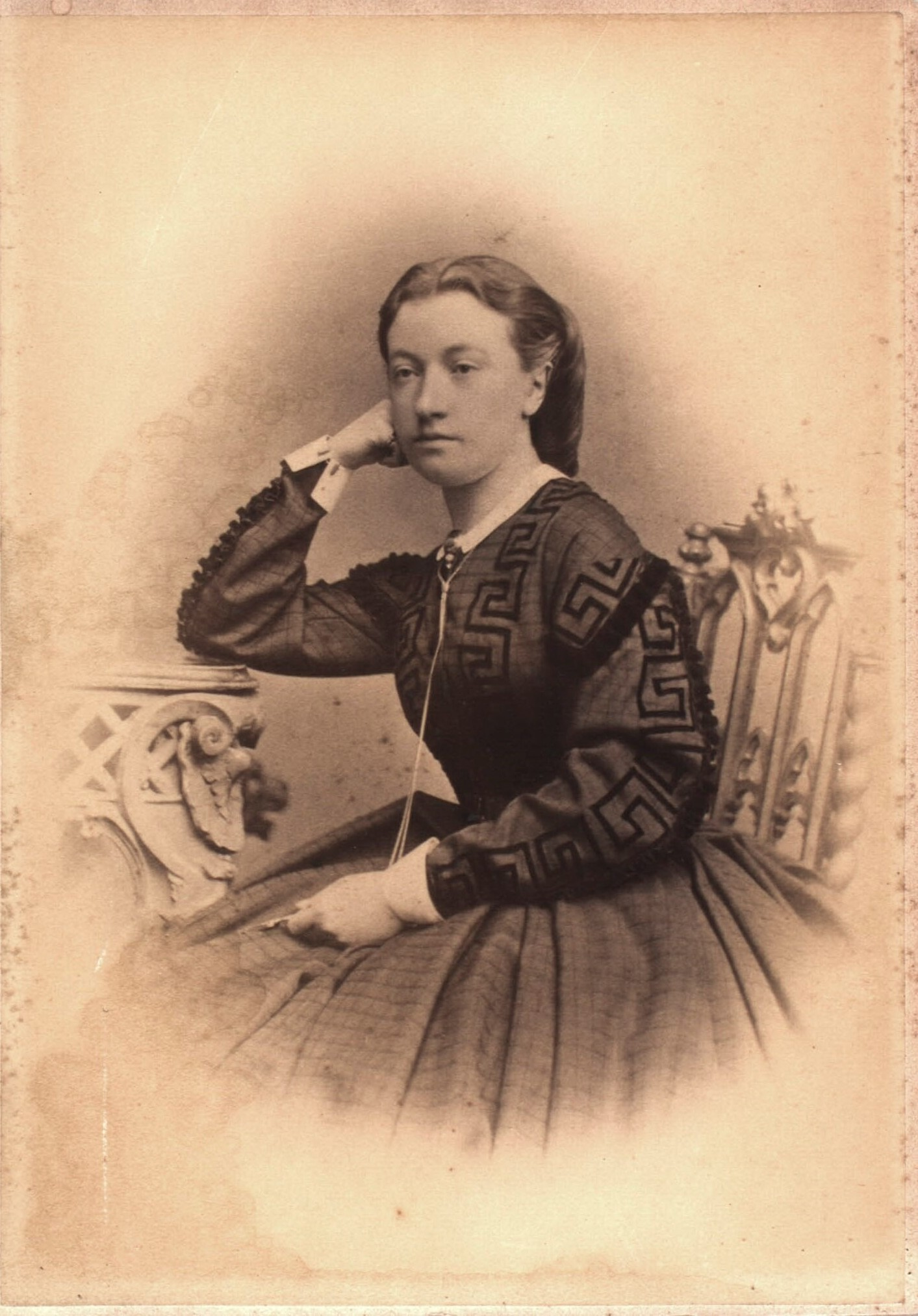
- Born: Charlotte Bournonville; 29 November 1832; Copenhagen, Denmark
- Died: 22 March 1911 (aged 78); Copenhagen, Denmark
- Occupations: Actress, Opera singer
- Years active: 1887 — 1884
- Parent(s): August Bournonville, Helena Fredrika Håkansson

Charlotte Helene Frederikke Bournonville (1832–1911) was a Danish opera singer and actress. Daughter of the celebrated Danish ballet master, August Bournonville, she first sang in Stockholm in 1857 before joining the Royal Danish Theatre in Copenhagen two years later. She is also remembered for giving singing lessons to the daughters of King Christian IX. In appreciation of her services, the king elevated her to the status of Kongelig Kammersanger (Royal Chamber Singer) in 1863.

== Biography ==
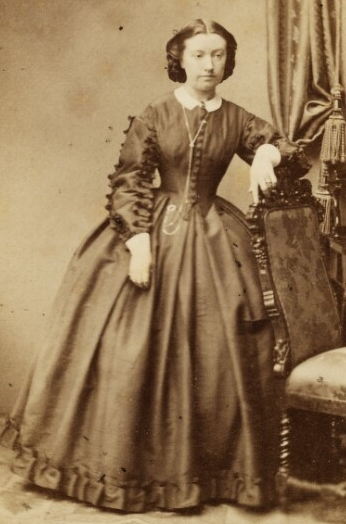
Charlotte Bournonville

Born on 29 November 1832 in Copenhagen, Charlotte Bournonville was the daughter of August Bournonville and Helena Fredrika Håkansson. She received singing lessons from Carl Helsted in Copenhagen, Arlet in Vienna and Giovanni Battista Lamperti in Milan. In early 1857, she appeared in concerts in Paris before being engaged by the Royal Theatre in Stockholm in July where she appeared in several concerts and played Fides in Meyerbeer's opera Profeten. She performed in Hamburg and Frankfurt in the winter of 1858-59. She then settled in Copenhagen where she was engaged by the Royal Danish Theatre, receiving a permanent appointment until 1884. There she first appeared in Vaudeville operettas before taking mezzo-soprano parts in opera. Her roles included Azucena in Il trovatore, Diana in Les diamants de la couronne, Mme Bertrand in Le maçon, fru Ragnhild in Ivar Hallström's Den bergtagna, Marthe in Faust and Marguerite in La dame blanche.

Although she performed well, Bournonville was rivalled by the mezzo-soprano Josephine Zinck whose good looks she lacked, causing her to appear increasingly less frequently. She finally retired from the theatre in 1884.

Charlotte Bournonville died in Copenhagen on 22 March 1911. She is buried in Asminderød Churchyard near Fredensborg.
