= Smaalenene Medier =

Norwegian media company

- Genre: Media
- Founded: 1996
- Headquarters: Askim, Norway
- Key people: Jarle Bentzen (CEO)
- Owner: A-pressen (100%)

Smaalenene Medier AS is a Norwegian media company. Owned 100% by A-pressen, it publishes the Askim-based newspaper Smaalenenes Avis, and has a 100% ownership of Enebakk Avis, Vestby Avis and Ås Avis. It also owns 6.9% of the local television station TV Østfold.

Before 2001, A-pressen only owned 49%.
