= Ole N. Hoemsnes =

Norwegian journalist (1927–2023)

Ole Norvald Hoemsnes (15 December 1927 – 5 November 2023) was a Norwegian journalist.

He was born in Fræna Municipality. He was hired as a political journalist in Morgenbladet in 1959, in Morgenposten in 1963 and in Aftenposten in 1964. From 1966 to 1970 he chaired the trade union Norwegian Union of Journalists, and from 1970 to 1971 he worked as a press counsellor in the Norwegian Office of the Prime Minister. He played a central role in the fall of the cabinet for which he was working; the Borten cabinet. Hoemsnes chronicled his own role in the 1986 book Skjebnedøgn.

After 1971, he returned to Aftenposten, where he worked until 1992. After retiring he has written several books on Norwegian industrial history.

Media offices
Preceded by Trygve Moe	Chairman of the Norwegian Union of Journalists; 1966–1970	Succeeded by Trygve Moe
