= Per Edgar Kokkvold =

Norwegian journalist

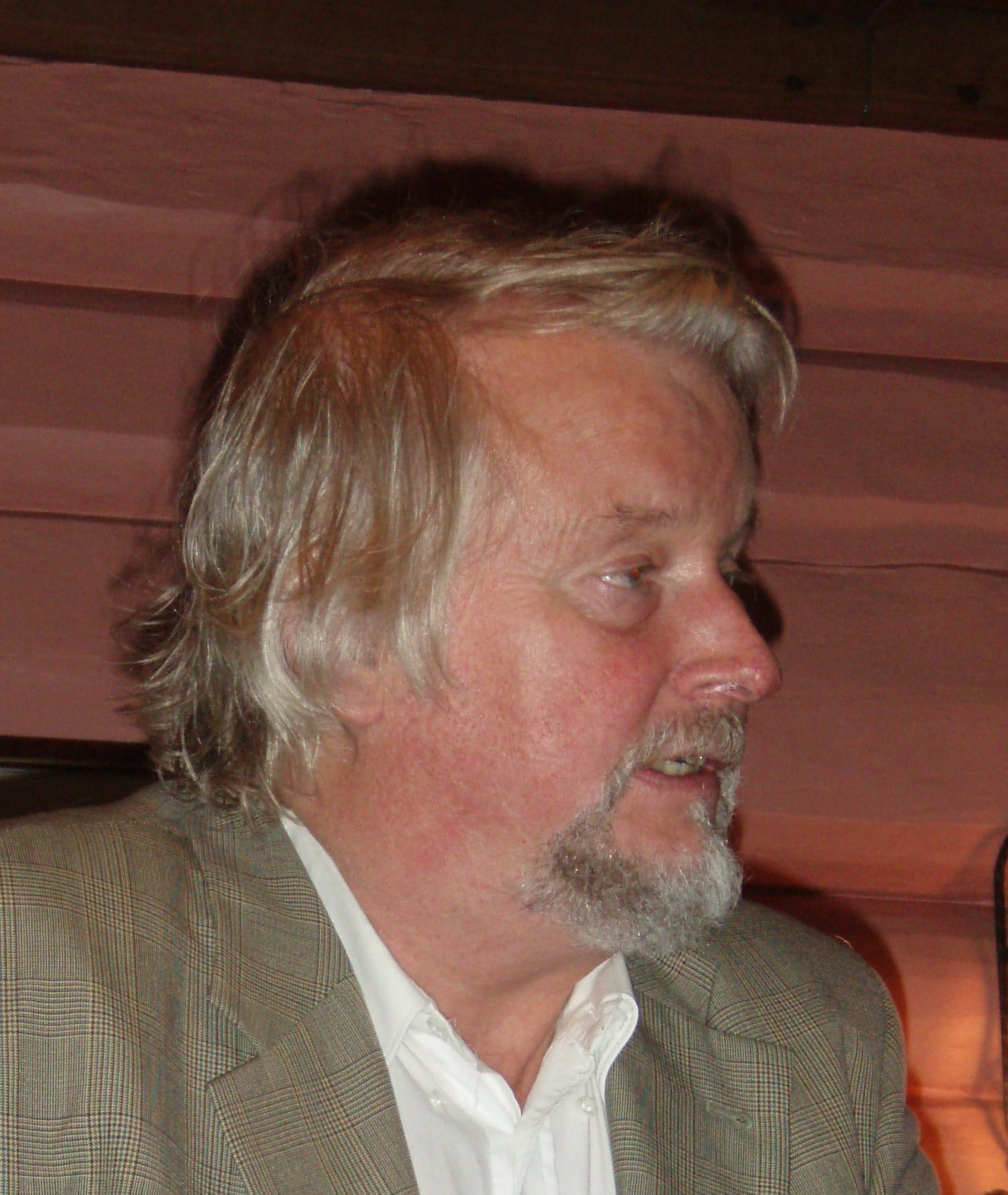
- Born: 26 March 1946 (age 80); Røros Municipality, Sør-Trøndelag, Norway
- Occupations: Journalist, chair of the Norwegian Broadcasting Council
- Awards: Fritt Ord Honorary Award, 2013

Per Edgar Kokkvold (born 26 March 1946) is a Norwegian journalist, former editor and secretary-general of the Norwegian Press Association, and current chair of the Norwegian Broadcasting Council.

Kokkvold was born in Røros Municipality. He spent most of his career in Arbeiderbladet, where he was foreign news commentator from 1973 to 1984, foreign news editor from 1984 to 1991 and editor (not editor-in-chief) from 1991 to 1996. He was the secretary-general of the Norwegian Press Association from 1996, until succeeded by Kjersti Løken Stavrum in 2013. He was in 2014 elected to chair the Norwegian Broadcasting Council for the period 2014 to 2017.

In 2006, controversy arose when Kokkvold advocated publishment of the Muhammad cartoons. He received several death threats related to the controversy and needed police protection for long periods.

In 2013 he was awarded the Fritt Ord Honorary Award for his fight for free speech and his commentary on media ethics and journalistic practice. He was awarded the inaugural Gunnar Sønsteby memorial prize together with Kristin Solberg in 2015.

Kokkvold resides in Drøbak, Norway.

Media offices
Preceded by Gunnar Gran	Secretary-general of the Norwegian Press Association; 1996–2013	Succeeded by Kjersti Løken Stavrum
