= Norwegian Union of Journalists =

Norwegian trade union

- Norsk Journalistlag
- Abbreviation: NJ
- Founded: 1946; 80 years ago
- Headquarters: Oslo
- Location: Norway
- Members: approx. 8,500
- Leader: Dag Idar Tryggestad
- Affiliations: Norwegian Press Association
- Website: nj.no

The Norwegian Union of Journalists (Norwegian: Norsk Journalistlag, NJ) is a trade union in Norway. It consists of approximately 8,500 editorial personnel in newspapers, magazines, television and radio, as well as freelancers and students.

A member organization of the Norwegian Press Association, it is not a part of the Norwegian Confederation of Trade Unions. Instead it negotiates directly with the Norwegian Media Businesses' Association as well as representatives for television and radio channels.

It has a twenty-person strong board of directors, a leader and a secretary general.

The union publishes the magazine Journalisten, and it co-owns the Norwegian Institute of Journalism in Fredrikstad.

== Leaders ==
- Dag Idar Tryggestad, 2021–
- Hege Iren Frantzen, 2017–2021
- Thomas Spence, 2013–2017
- Elin Floberghagen, 2007–2013
- Ann-Magrit Austenå, 2003–2007
- Olav Njaastad, 1999–2003
- Diis Bøhn, 1995–1999
- Alf Skjeseth, 1991–1995
- Sven Egil Omdal, 1987–1991
- Anne Skatvedt, 1984–1987
- Trygve Moe, 1970–1983
- Ole N. Hoemsnes, 1966–1970
- Trygve Moe, 1964–1966
- Ivar Johansen, 1962–1964
- Vegard Sletten, 1956–1962
- A. Skjegstad, 1949–1956
- Vegard Sletten, 1946–1949
