= Gisle Midttun =

Early 20th century Norwegian historian and museologist

- Born: 1881; Quindherred Municipality, Norway
- Died: 1940 (aged 58–59)
- Occupations: Cultural historian Museologist

Gisle Midttun (1881–1940) was a Norwegian cultural historian and museologist. He was born in Quindherred Municipality, and was a brother of philologist Olav Midttun. Midttun was assigned with the Norwegian Museum of Cultural History from 1910. He was a co-editor of the multi-volume series Norske bygder, where he also published several of his scientific works.
