= Ann-Magrit Austenå =

Norwegian journalist and organizational leader

- Born: 28 June 1961 (age 65); Oslo, Norway
- Education: University of Oslo
- Occupations: journalist, organizational leader

Ann-Magrit Austenå (born 28 June 1961) is a Norwegian journalist and organizational leader. As of 2018 she is secretary-general of NOAS, the Norwegian Organisation for Asylum Seekers.

She was born in Oslo. She graduated as cand.mag. in sociology, social science and mass communication from the University of Oslo in 1985, and has been journalist for the newspapers Vårt Land and Dagbladet. She chaired the Norwegian Union of Journalists from 2003 to 2007. From 2007 to 2009 she was assistant secretary-general of the Norwegian Red Cross, and since 2010 she has been secretary-general of the Norwegian Organisation for Asylum Seekers.

Media offices
Preceded by Olav Njaastad	Chairman of the Norwegian Union of Journalists; 2003–2007	Succeeded by Elin Floberghagen
