= Trygve Moe (journalist) =

Norwegian journalist (1927–2025)

Trygve Moe (11 December 1927 – 25 November 2025) was a Norwegian journalist.

== Life and career ==
Moe was born in Sandefjord on 11 December 1927. He was a journalist in Dagbladet from 1958 to 1973. He was the chairman of the trade union Norwegian Union of Journalists from 1964 to 1966 and 1970 to 1983, and secretary general from 1983 to 1985. He was then picture editor in the Norwegian News Agency from 1986 to 1989, and CEO from 1989 to 1994. From 1989, he also chaired the board of Kopinor.

Moe died on 25 November 2025, at the age of 97.

Media offices
Preceded by Ivar Johansen	Chairman of the Norwegian Union of Journalists; 1964–1966	Succeeded by Ole N. Hoemsnes
Preceded by Ole N. Hoemsnes	Chairman of the Norwegian Union of Journalists; 1970–1983	Succeeded by Anne Skatvedt
