= Jakob Hveding Sletten =

Norwegian priest and musician (1872–1936)

Jakob Hveding Sletten (4 December 1872 – 7 December 1936) was a Norwegian priest and musician.

He was born in Høyland Municipality to parents who hailed from Lindås Municipality. The family moved to Lindås in 1882. He finished his secondary education in 1895, and graduated with the cand.theol. degree in 1901. He was a curate in Stavanger Cathedral from 1902, then curate in the Diocese of Nidaros from 1905. From 1909 to 1914 he was vicar in Vestnes, and in 1916 he was appointed curate in the Diocese of Kristiania with special responsibility to hold ceremonies in Nynorsk. His brother Klaus Sletten and nephew Vegard Sletten were both active in the Nynorsk movement. Sletten was married to Aagot Hansen from Kristiania from September 1902 to her death in January 1912. He later married Elvine Staven, a farmer's daughter from Namdalseid Municipality, in September 1936.

Sletten was also an accomplished choral musician in his day. He was represented with eight tunes in Koralbok for den norske kirke in 1926, and with twelve tunes in Sven Moren's Songbok. He also released his own work; Koralbok for det norske folk.
