= Elin Floberghagen =

Norwegian journalist and organizational leader (born 1969)

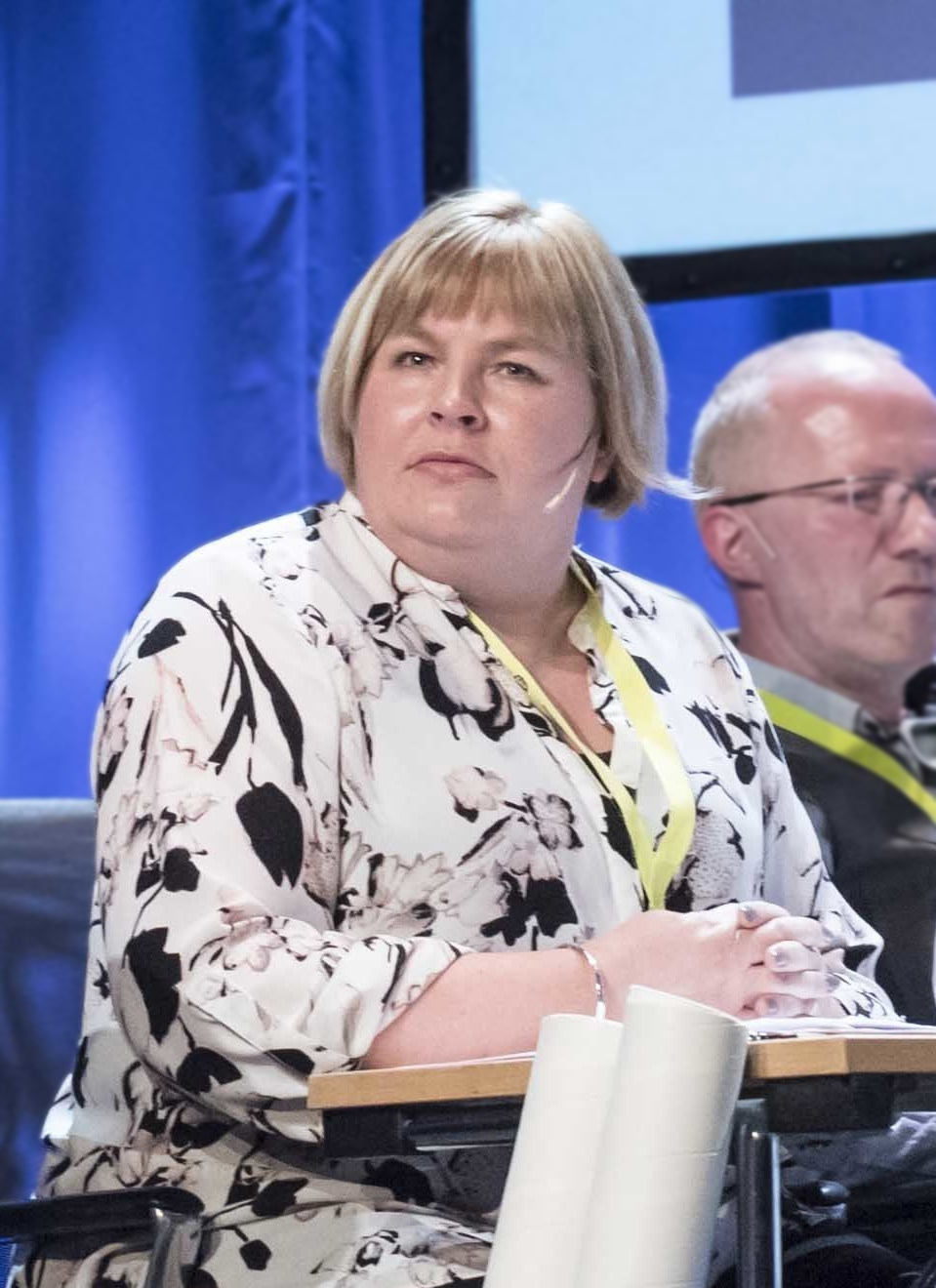
- Born: 6 November 1969 (age 56); Frogn, Norway
- Education: University of Oslo
- Occupations: journalist, organizational leader
- Organization: Norwegian Press Association

Elin Floberghagen (born 6 November 1969) is a Norwegian journalist and organizational leader.

She was born in Frogn. She graduated as cand.mag. in folkloristics, history and social science from the University of Oslo, and was journalist for the newspaper Østlandets Blad from 1997 to 2007. She chaired the Norwegian Union of Journalists from 2007 to 2013. From 2013 to 2016 she was chief executive of Fagpressen, and thereafter secretary-general of the Norwegian Press Association from 2016.

Media offices
Preceded by Ann-Magrit Austenå	Chairman of the Norwegian Union of Journalists; 2007–2013	Succeeded by Thomas Spence
Preceded by Kjersti Løken Stavrum	Secretary-general of the Norwegian Press Association; 2016–	Succeeded by incumbent
