= Kristian Solmer Vedel =

Danish industrial designer

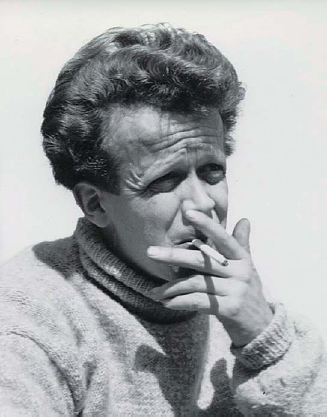
Kristian Vedel in 1958

Kristian Solmer Vedel (2 March 1923 - 5 March 2003) was a Danish industrial designer and part of the Scandinavian Design movement.

== Life ==
He completed his apprenticeship as cabinetmaker in 1942. From 1944-45 he was visiting student under professor Kaare Klint at the Department of Furniture at the Royal Academy of Fine Arts in Copenhagen. In 1946, he graduated from the Furniture Design Department of the School of Arts, Crafts and Design in Copenhagen, where he also lectured 1953-56. He served as chairman of Danish Furniture Designers 1947-49. He was instrumental in establishing the Industrial Designers of Denmark and served as the society's first chairman, from 1966 to 1968.

In 1950, he married Birgit (née Arnfred), and in 1954, they set up a design studio in Humlebæk, outside Copenhagen. The couple had four children, but were divorced in 1961. Vedel married his second wife, Ane (born Pedersen) in 1961.

Between 1968 and 1971, Kristian Vedel organised and led the Department of Industrial Design at the University of Nairobi, Kenya.

He and his wife, Ane, returned to Denmark in 1972 to establish a design studio on Thyholm, in North-Western Jutland. At Thyholm Kristian Vedel devoted most of his time to cultivating the surrounding landscape, breeding Shropshire sheep, and researching utilization of their wool, hides and meat.

He died on 5 March 2003 and is buried in Humlebæk Cemetery in Humlebæk.

== Notable designs and design philosophy ==
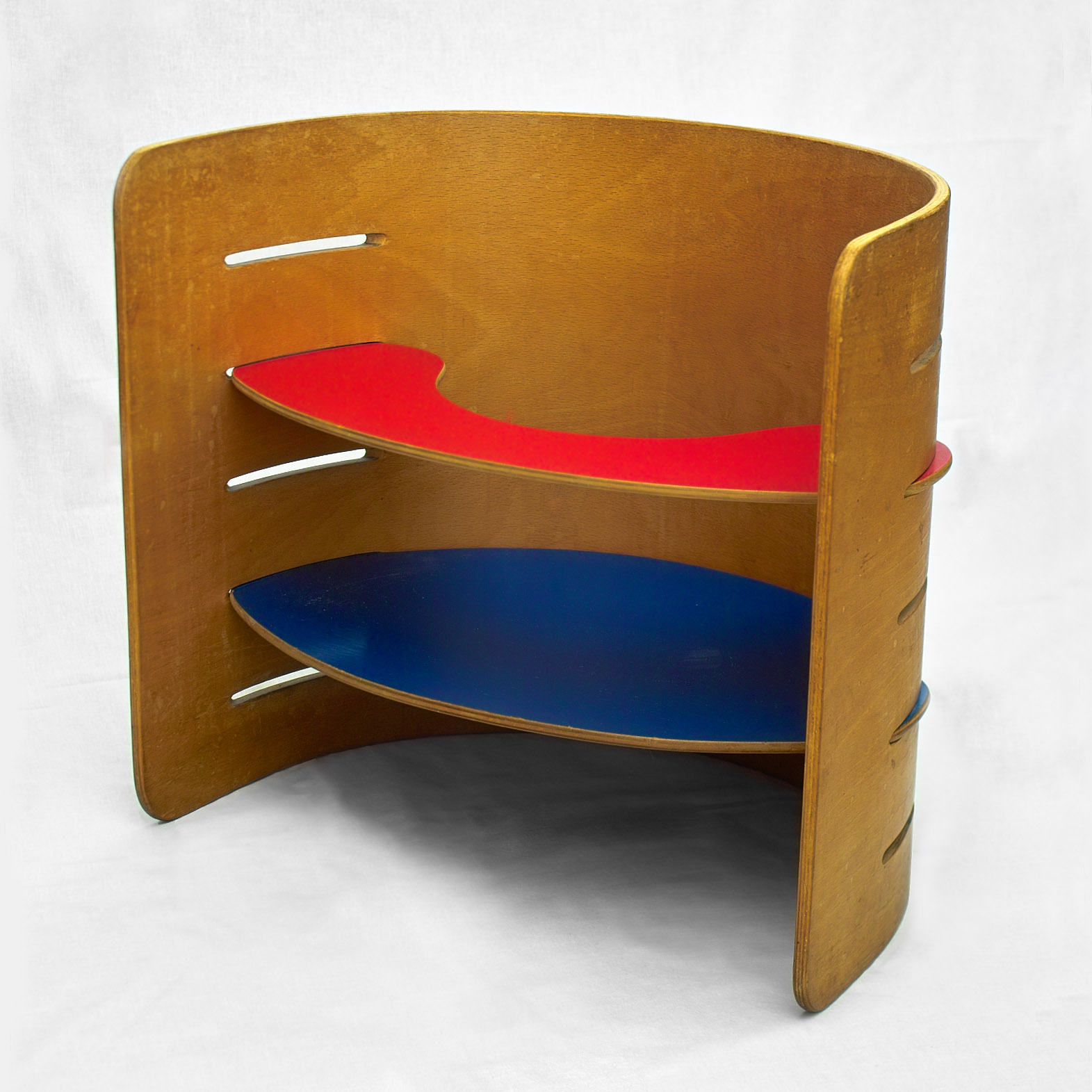
Children's furniture (1951) Photo: Gisle Hannemyr

Influenced by Kaare Klint and the German Bauhaus school, his "classic modern" designs are characterized by creative use of materials, especially plastics and wood, and with a strong sense for ergonomic and functional requirements. A typical example is his children's furniture, which could be adapted to a growing child, turned over to be used as a toy. In all respects, the furniture was designed for children according to children's needs, rather than just being a miniature version of adult furniture.

In an interview, Kristian Vedel stated his position as follows:

The starting point for an industrial artist's work must always be that he, from his own point of view, and as objectively as possible, takes a position with regard to what he feels society and his fellow men need; he must personally take a stand on the existing possibilities and responsibilities.

== Awards ==
Vedel has been awarded 1st prize by Copenhagen Cabinetmakers Guild (1947), Louisiana Museum Prize (1957), silver medal at La Triennale di Milano for children's furniture (1957), a gold medal at La Triennale di Milano for his line of stackable melamine dishes and containers, the Design Award at Interplast in London (1961) and the Lunning Prize (1962).

In January–May 2007, Trapholt Museum in Denmark mounted a retrospective exhibition of major works. As an adjunct to the exhibition, Arkitektens Forlag published a book featuring the works and drawings of Kristian Vedel.
