= Kristen Eik-Nes =

Norwegian medical scientist (1922–1992)

- Born: 28 September 1922; Sparbu, Norway
- Died: 23 February 1992 (aged 69)
- Occupation: Medical scientist
- Known for: Contributions to androgen research
- Parents: Knut Eik-Nes (father); Nina Eik-Nes (mother)

Kristen Borgar Dahler Eik-Nes (28 September 1922 – 23 February 1992) was a Norwegian medical scientist, known for his contributions to androgen research.

== Biography ==
Eik-Nes was born at the village of Sparbu (now Steinkjer) in Nord-Trøndelag, Norway. He was the son of Nina Eik-Nes, a politician, and Knut Eik-Nes, a priest. During his childhood he contracted tuberculosis and in early adulthood he developed insulin-dependent diabetes; although his education was delayed as a result of his illness, it sparked an interest in medicine. He took his cand.med examination in 1942 and graduated from the medical program at the University of Oslo in 1951. During the German occupation of Norway he was a member of Milorg, and eventually a regional Milorg leader.

After receiving his medical degree, Eik-Nes moved to the United States, where he had spent eight months as a student with the endocrinology researcher Leo T. Samuels University of Utah in Salt Lake City. He was appointed professor at the University of Utah from 1958, and later at the University of Southern California in Los Angeles. In his American years, his initial research was on stress hormones produced by the adrenal glands, and he later studied sex hormones – estrogen and androgens – becoming a world leader in androgen research. He took part in efforts to create a male contraceptive pill. He returned to Norway after 20 years in the United States and from 1972 he was professor in biophysics at the Norwegian Institute of Technology in Trondheim. He was a member of the Norwegian Academy of Science and Letters.

He was diagnosed with lung cancer in 1985 died seven years later from a heart attach. Following his death, his expansive art collection was bequeathed to Trondhjems Kunstforening.
