= Smaalenenes Avis =

Norwegian newspaper

- Type: Daily newspaper
- Owner(s): Smaalenene Medier; A-pressen
- Editor: Jarle Bentzen
- Founded: 1899
- Political alignment: Independent
- Headquarters: Askim
- Circulation: 13,190
- Website: www.smaalenene.no

Smaalenenes Avis is a local newspaper published in Askim, Norway. It covers Indre Østfold.

It was established in Mysen in 1899 under the name Indre Smaalenenes Avis, and covered the municipalities of Eidsberg, Trøgstad and Marker. A trial issue came on 22 December 1899, followed by the first official issue on 4 January 1900. The first editor, who sat until 1901, was a Methodist pastor. Peder Slotsvik took over. It had a politically bourgeois leaning, with an unofficial Liberal affiliation during Slotsvik's time, then a Norwegian Agrarian Association affiliation in the 1920s. In 1929 it absorbed the agrarian newspaper Søndre Østfold. In the 1930s Indre Smaalenenes Avis gradually became an unofficially Conservative newspaper. During the German occupation of Norway it was forced to have a Nazi editor from 1942 to 1945.

The circulation improved from about 4,000 in 1932 to 4,853 in 1950, 5,928 in 1970 and 7,578 in 1990. In 1983 the newspapers Indre Smaalenenes Avis and neighbor Øvre Smaalenene were about the same size, with a circulation of 6,995 and 7,061 respectively. In 1996 the Indre Smaalenenes Avis was surprisingly bought by A-pressen, despite its bourgeois roots. Already on 2 January 1997 the Askim-based newspaper Øvre Smaalenene was amalgamated into Indre Smaalenenes Avis From 3 February 2003 the name was changed to Smaalenenes Avis. The headquarters are now in Askim. It now has a circulation of 13,190, of whom 12,905 are subscribers. It is owned by the company Smaalenene Medier, which is in turn owned 100% by A-pressen.
