= Josephine Zinck =

Danish mezzo-soprano

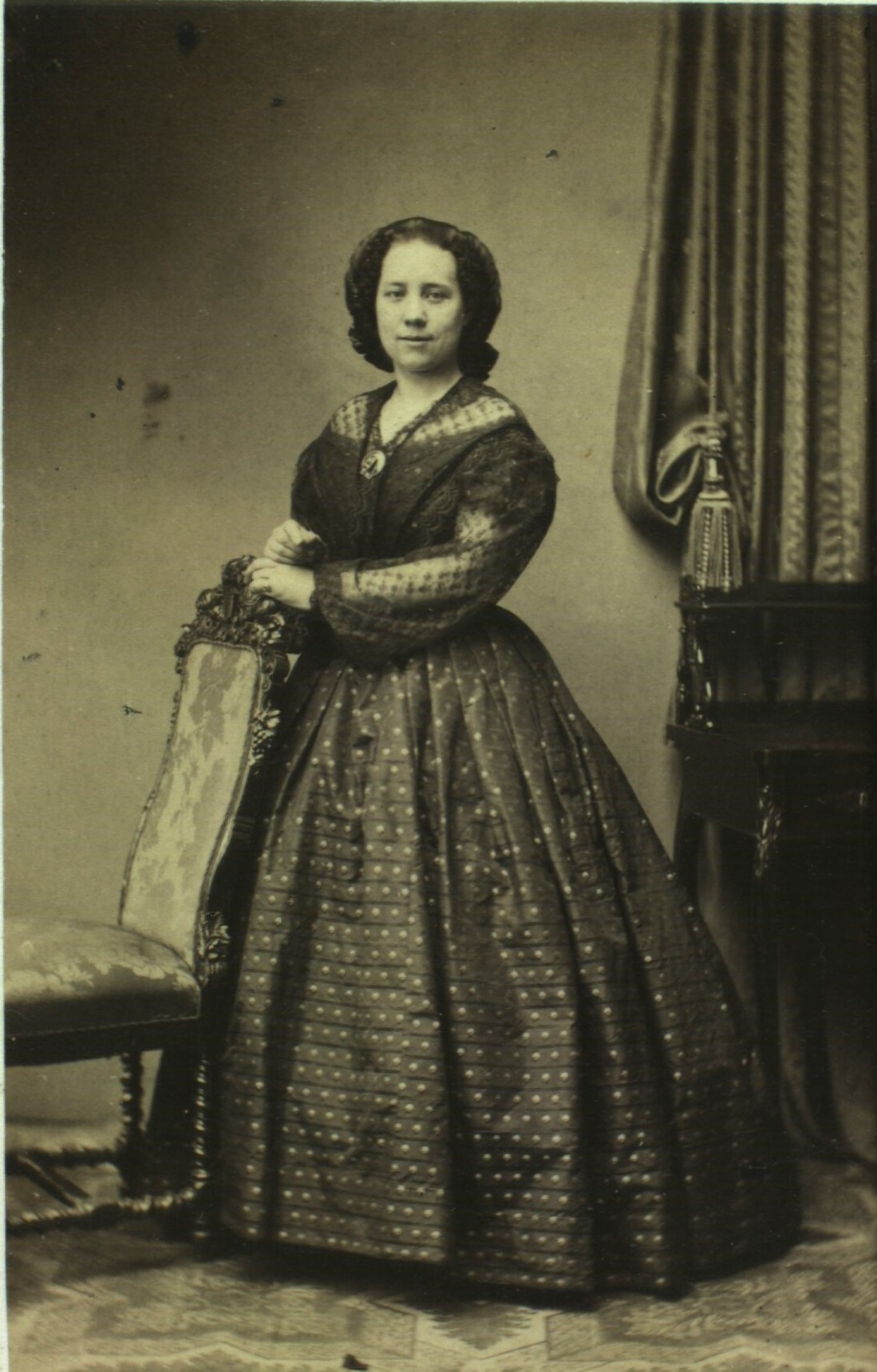
Josephine Amalie Zinck

Josephine Amalie Zinck née Lund (1829–1919) was a Danish mezzo-soprano singer who performed in concerts at Copenhagen's Musikforeningen from the age of 18 and in operas at the Royal Danish Theatre from 1858.

== Biography ==
Born in Copenhagen on 19 January 1829, Josephine Amalie Lund was the daughter of Jørgen Andersen Lund (1774-1862) and Ane Christine Rasmussen (ca. 1802-68). In 1861, she married the singing prompter August Zinck (1831–85). Josephine Lund's impressive singing voice was discovered while she was at school when her singing teacher encouraged her to perform on stage. She was later trained under the opera singer Peter Schram and the composer and music teacher Edvard Helsted.

In 1851, she began singing in concerts at the Musikforeningen where she was acclaimed for her interpretation of songs from Così fan tutte and, in 1854, for playing the mother in the first performance of Niels Gade's Elverskud. She sang lieder by Schubert and Schumann together with Julius Steenberg, as well as works by Peter Heise. She received further training in London in 1857 from the Spanish singing instructor Manuel García, returning to Copenhagen to give a solo concert at the Casino Theatre.

She first performed as an opera singer at the Royal Theatre in 1858, playing Benjamin in Étienne Méhul's Joseph. She was even more successful as Ingeborg in Johann Hartmann's Liden Kirsten and was able to release the full potential of her talents as Orsini in Donizetti's Lucrezia Borgia. After Charlotte Bournonville's rather disappointing performances of Azucena in Il trovatore, she was entrusted with the role. In 1869, on Gade's recommendation, she left the theatre to sing in Leipzig where she presented works by Peter Heise to great acclaim.

Zinck's last performances were in 1871, both at the Royal Theatre and Musikforeningen. She officially retired in 1874. Josephine Zinck died in Copenhagen on 25 November 1919 and is buried in the Assistens Cemetery.
