= Olav Midttun =

Norwegian magazine editor and broadcasting director

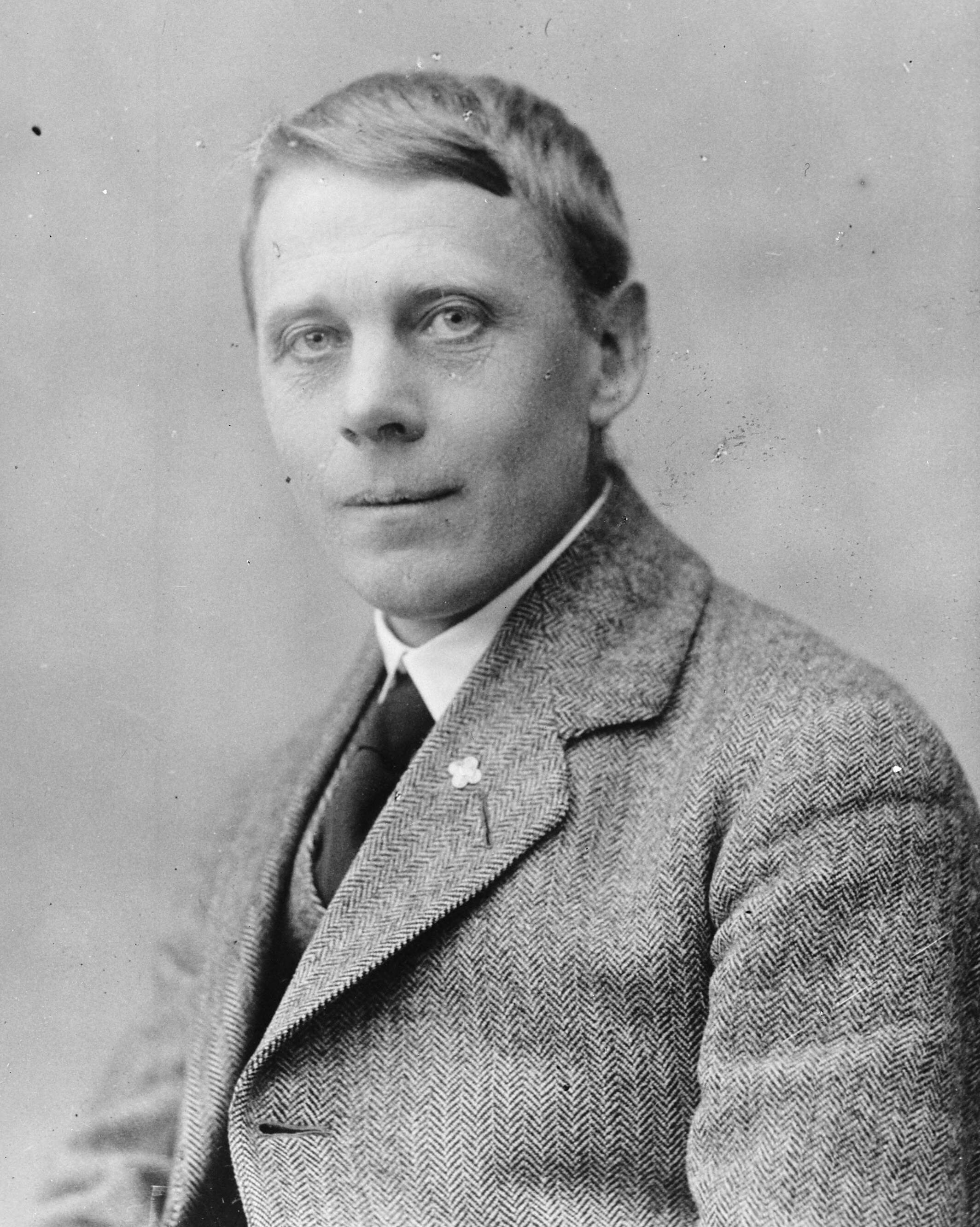
- Born: 8 April 1883; Mauranger
- Died: 5 January 1972 (aged 88)
- Occupations: Philologist; biographer; magazine editor; broadcasting director
- Employer(s): University of Oslo; Norwegian Broadcasting Corporation
- Relatives: Gisle Midttun (brother)

Olav Midttun (8 April 1883 – 5 January 1972) was a Norwegian philologist, biographer, magazine editor, and media executive. He edited the cultural magazine Syn og Segn for more than fifty years, and was the first national program director of the Norwegian Broadcasting Corporation (NRK).

== Personal life ==
Midttun was born in Mauranger as a son of teacher Jørgen Midttun (1855–1938) and Marta Øvrehus (1847–1920). He was a brother of Gisle Midttun. He was married twice, first from October 1909 to Mietze Bentsen, née Sandkuhl (1877–1942), then from 1950 to Borghild Skarmann.

== Career ==
Graduating as cand.mag. in 1910, Midttun lectured at the University of Oslo from 1917 to 1934.

He edited the cultural magazine Syn og Segn for more than fifty years, from 1908 to 1960. He was program manager of NRK from its start in 1933. He was fired in 1940 by the Nazi regime during the occupation of Norway by Nazi Germany, and returned after the Second World War as program manager from 1945 to 1947. He was later a professor at the University of Oslo, and wrote several biographies. He was also a member of Bærum municipal council.

Cultural offices
Preceded by Sven Moren	Chairman of Noregs Ungdomslag; 1919–1926	Succeeded by Halvdan Wexelsen Freihow
