= Francis Zachariae =

Danish businessman, publisher, and philanthropist

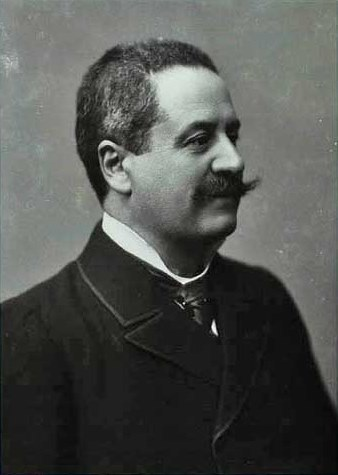
- Francis Zachariae in circa 1900
- Born: 29 March 1852; Copenhagen, Denmark
- Died: 6 September 1936 (aged 84); Copenhagen, Denmark
- Occupation(s): Businessman and publisher
- Awards: Knight of the Dannebrog

Francis James Zachariae (29 March 1852 – 6 September 1936) was a Danish businessman, local historic publisher and philanthropist. He is today mainly remembered for publishing Før og Nu (I-IX and Supplements I-II) with topographical-historical images of Copenhagen from 1915 to 1927.

== Early life and education ==
Zachariae was born in Copenhagen, the son of medical doctor Georges James Zachariae (1818–88) and Margaret Fanny Lang (1824-1909). He graduated from Efterslægtselskabets Skole in 1868 and was thereafter an apprentice in S. Seidelin and Benny Goldschmidt in Copenhagen and Robinow & Majoribank in Glasgow.

== Commercial career ==
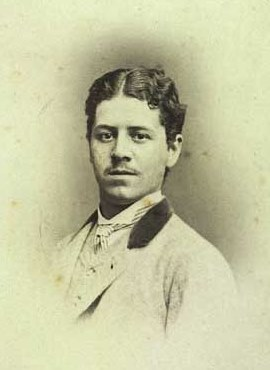
Francis Zachariae by Hansen, Schou & Weller

Zachariae worked for Landmandsbanken in 1872-74. In 1874, he established a company making clothes for men in Copenhagen. He later also opened a retail store under the name Zachariaes Magasiner at Kultorvet 16. It was for many years one of the leading firms in the industry in Denmark. Zachariae headed the firm until 1931 and it was then passed to his long-time employee J. M. Rohwedder (1871-1950). In 1892, Zachariae founded the Association of Manufacturers of Gentlemen Clothing in Copenhagen (Foreningen af københavnske fabrikanter af herreklæder). He served as president of the association from 1911 to 1920.

== Publisher and local historian ==
Zachariae used historical images in advertisements for his business. This inspired him to found a topographical-historical publication about the city. He published Før og Nu I-IX, in 1915-23 followed by two Supplementary publications I–II in 1924-27. He was personally deeply incolced in the work with compiling an extensive collections of often rare images from Copenhagen. The accompanying text by changing writers is of varying quality.

== Personal life and philanthropy ==
Zachariae married twice. His first wife was Adriane (Addy) Louise Beckett (1851-1910), a daughter of merchant on Saint Croix Francis B. and Ann Eliza Lang (1822–89). They married on 22 February 1878 in St. Paul's Church in Copenhagen. His second wife was Nelly Mathilde Christophersen (1879-1931), a daughter of gardener Peter Julius C. (1845-1905) and Marie Kirstine Christoffersen (1853-1900). They married on 4 June 1915.

He lived in Fredensborg from 1899. He was chairman of the parish council from 1905 to 1921. He purchased Skansebakken at Hillerød in 1894 to protect the views from the hill. He later purchased the surrounding land and converted it into a public park in 1935. He purchased Asminderød Church in 1919, restored it and gave it to the congregation with capital for future maintenance. In 1921, he founded the Nelly Zachariae Memorial Foundation, with circa DKK 1,300,000 in initial capital, supporting people who has experienced a deroute in life. In 1925, he was the principal founder of the institution Olaf Poulsens Minde (Slotsgade 4) in Fredensborg.
