= Gunnar Stavrum =

Norwegian newspaper editor and author (born 1961)

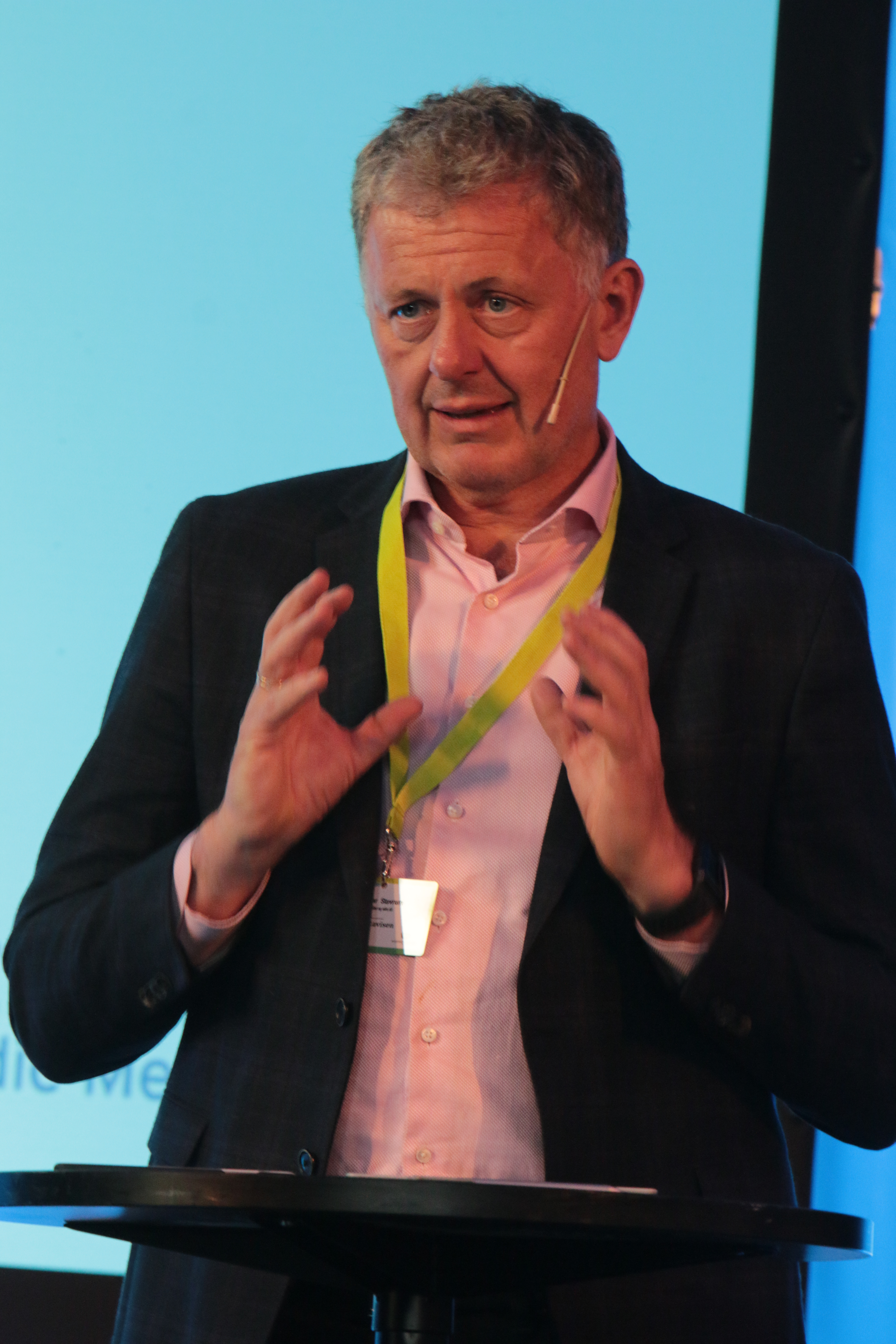
Stavrum in 2017

Gunnar Stavrum (born 24 October 1961) is a Norwegian newspaper editor and author. Since 2026 he has been chief editor of the newspaper Dagbladet. From 2003 to 2026 he was chief editor of the online newspaper Nettavisen.

== Early years ==
Stavrum was born in Kristiansund, and grew up in Bergen and Kristiansand.

== Career ==
He began his career as a substitute journalist for Fædrelandsvennen in 1982, and for NRK Sørlandet in 1983. He was hired as a journalist for Bergens Tidende in 1985, and became managing editor of Kapital in 1990, and of Dagens Næringsliv in 1993. He worked as a reporter for TV 2 from 1996 to 2000, and from 2000 he was manager of TV 2 Interaktiv AS. From 2003 to 2026 he was chief editor of Nettavisen (named TV 2 Nettavisen until 2008), and executive director of Mediehuset Nettavisen AS from 2008.

He was appointed chief editor of the newspaper Dagbladet from 2026.

As an author he has written biographies about Norwegian billionaires John Fredriksen, Petter Stordalen and Kjell Inge Røkke.

In 2015, he was awarded the "opinion carrier of the year" by the Oslo Editor's Association.

== Personal life ==
He is married to former secretary general of the Norwegian Press Association (2013-2016), and since 2016 chief executive of the Tinius Trust, Kjersti Løken Stavrum.
