= Sven Moren =

Norwegian farmer and writer (1871–1938)

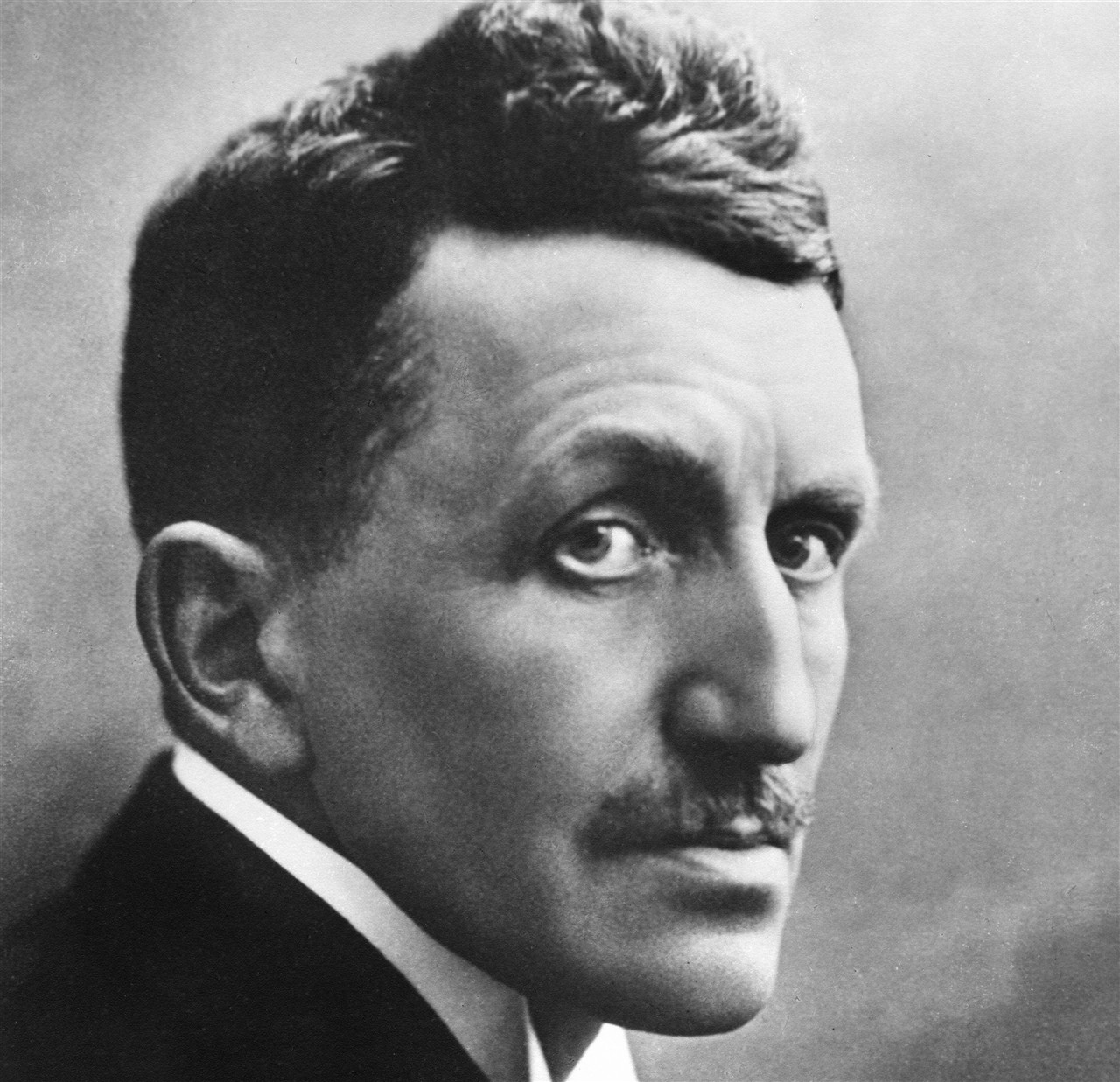
- Born: 28 October 1871; Trysil, Norway
- Died: 14 December 1938 (aged 67)
- Occupation: writer
- Children: Halldis Moren Vesaas; Sigmund Moren

Sven Moren (28 October 1871 – 14 December 1938) was a Norwegian farmer, poet, story writer, playwright, children's writer, organizer and politician for the Liberal Party.

== Personal life ==
Moren was born in Trysil Municipality on 28 October 1871, as the son of farmers John Svensen Moren and Hanna Halvorsdatter Buflod. He married Gudrid Breie in 1907, and was the father of poet Halldis Moren Vesaas and educator Sigmund Moren. He died in Trysil in 1938.

== Career ==
Moren published his first poetry collection, Vers, in 1895. His next collection, Hildring came in 1897. His story Paa villstraa was published in 1898. His literary breakthrough was the story Storskogen from 1904. The book is framed around a traditional love story between a boy from a cotter's family and a girl from a large farm. It treats various aspects from the old rural society, mixed with modern forestry and trade fluctuations, over-population and class distinction. In 1907 he published Svartelva, a book with lyrical nature descriptions. In 1909 he published the children's book Den store tømmerdrifta. In 1915 he published the children's book Dei morlause gutane i Skardfjellet and the play Vaarflaumen. Among Moren's other novels were Garden og bygda from 1924, Grøndalskongen from 1925, and Vegaskile from 1926. His novel series Styrkeprøve (1929), Riket er ditt (1932) and Skuldmennene (1934) treats conflicts between forest workers and forest owners. He chaired the organization Norsk Bokmannslag from 1913 to 1917, and was a member of the literary council of the Norwegian Authors' Union from 1915 to 1928.

He chaired the organization Noregs Ungdomslag for two periods. He became a popular speaker of national fame, through his appearances at the large gatherings of this society. He was a member of the school board and the municipal council of Trysil Municipality, initiated a local museum, and was a proponent for extending the railway to Trysil. He was fielded as the Liberal Party's running mate to S. Nergaard in the 1915 Norwegian parliamentary election, but ended in last place. The same thing happened in the 1918 general election.

Cultural offices
Preceded by Peter Slotsvik	Chairman of Noregs Ungdomslag; 1899–1901	Succeeded by Klaus Sletten
Preceded by Nikolaus Gjelsvik	Chairman of Noregs Ungdomslag; 1915–1919	Succeeded by Olav Midttun
