= Kjersti Løken Stavrum =

Norwegian journalist and editor (born 1969)

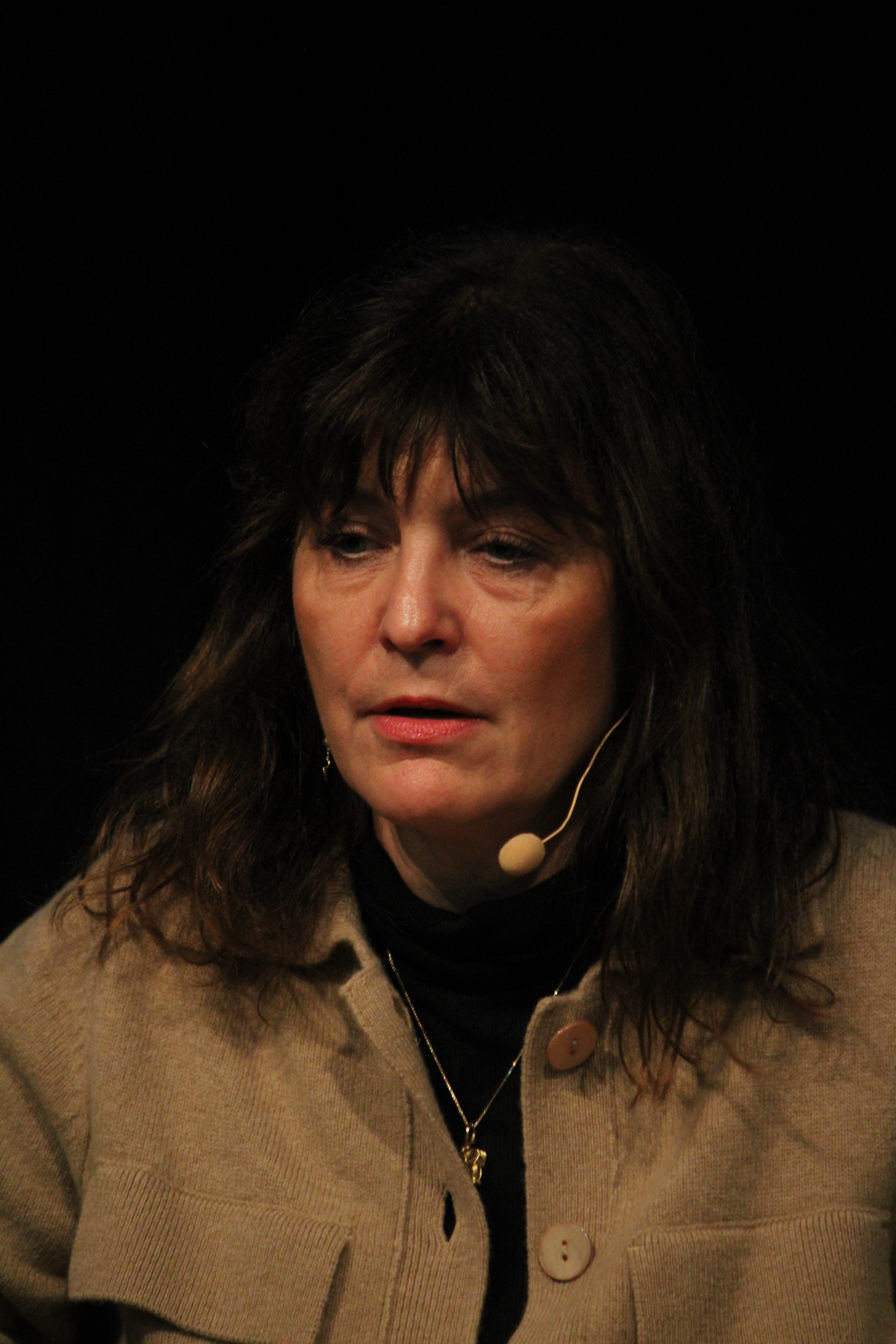
- Stavrum in 2025
- Born: March 1, 1969 (age 57); Sarpsborg, Norway
- Occupations: journalist, editor
- Known for: Secretary General of the Norwegian Press Association
- Spouse: Gunnar Stavrum
- Relatives: Karl Petter Løken (brother)

Kjersti Løken Stavrum (born 1 March 1969) is a Norwegian journalist and editor. Since April 2013, she has been Secretary General of the Norwegian Press Association.

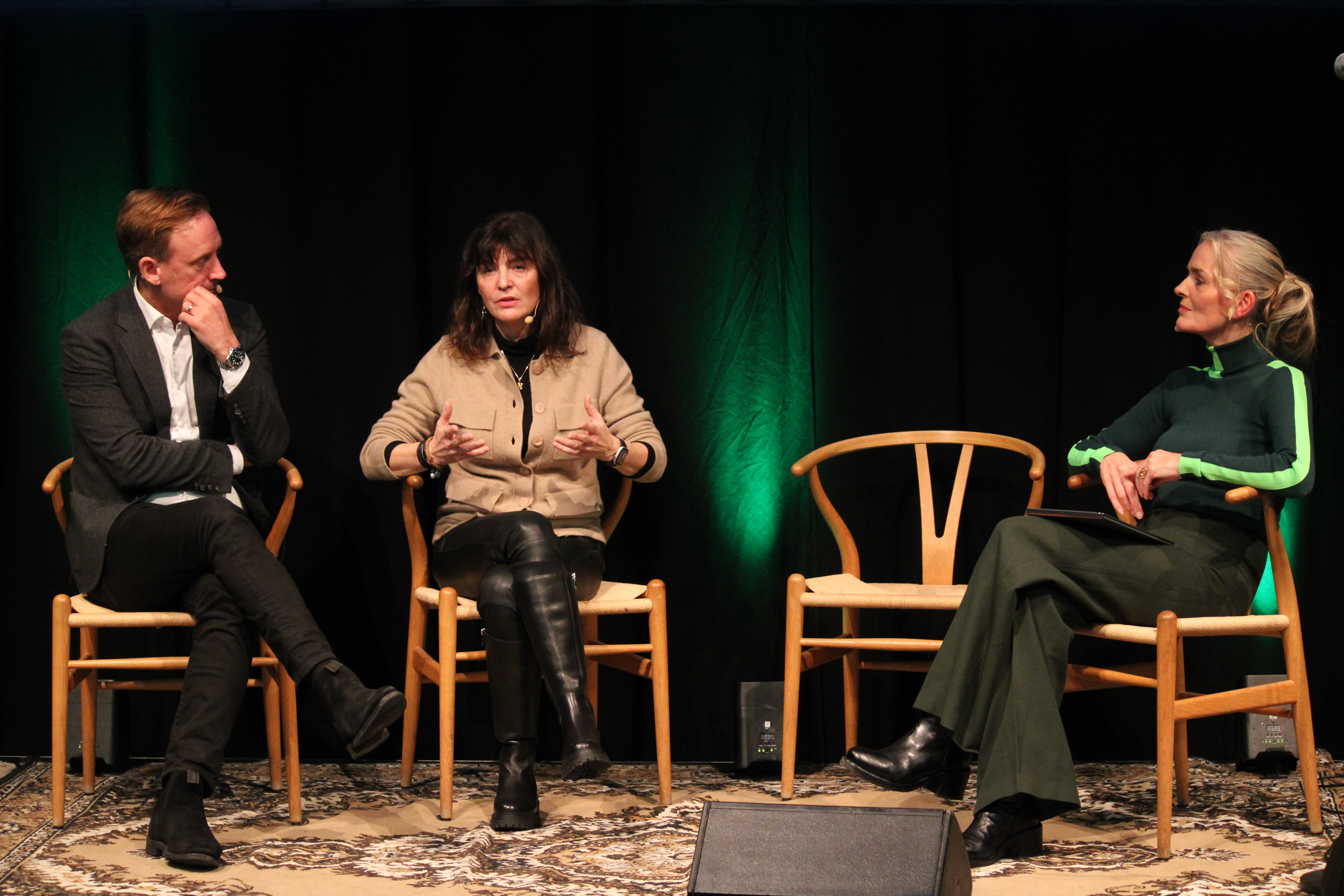
Stavrum with Caspar Opitz and Hilde Sandvik in Copenhagen, 2025

Born in Sarpsborg in south-eastern Norway, Stavrum is a graduate in political science. She began her career with the Norwegian newspaper Aftenposten in 1994. In 2001, she became editor in chief for the weekly women's magazine Kvinner og Klær. She returned to Aftenposten in 2005 as feature editor for the paper's revamped weekly magazine A-magasinet, where she remained until 2012. Thereafter, for a short period she was head of the communications department of the Confederation of Norwegian Enterprise (NHO). In April 2013, she was appointed Secretary General of the Norwegian Press Association, replacing Per Edgar Kokkvold who had occupied the post since 1996.

In 2003, Stavrum received the Norwegian title of Female Media Leader of the Year (Årets kvinnelig medieleder) in recognition for her success in making KK (Kvinner og Klær) Norway's most popular women's magazine.

Kjersti Løken Stavrum is a sister of Karl Petter Løken and is married to Gunnar Stavrum, editor in chief of the online newspaper Nettavisen.

Media offices
| Preceded by Per Edgar Kokkvold | Secretary-general of the Norwegian Press Association; 2013–2016 | Succeeded by Elin Floberghagen |
