= Klaus Sletten =

Norwegian politician (1877–1946)

Klaus Daae Sletten (5 March 1877 – 4 April 1946) was a Norwegian organizational worker and politician who spent his professional career as an editor of magazines and newspapers. He was known as a supporter of the Nynorsk cause.

== Early life ==
He was born in Høyland Municipality as a son of Johannes Ingebrigtsen Sletten (1835–1892) and Dorthea Marthine K. Ruus (1842–1922). He was a brother of Jakob Hveding Sletten. In 1882 the family moved to Lindaas Municipality. He worked as a journalist in the newspaper Den 17de Mai from 1897.

== Career ==
On 15 October 1899 he was one of the five founders of Bondeungdomslaget in Kristiania. Among his political wishes was the establishment of an own church for members of the organization, church service conducted in the Nynorsk form of Norwegian as well as Nynorsk theatre. In August 1905 he married the first deputy chairman of Bondeungdomslaget, Margit Bruun (1875–1958), a daughter of Christopher Bruun. She was also a treasurer in Noregs Ungdomslag, an organization chaired and managed by Klaus Sletten from 1901 to 1906 and 1906 to 1912 respectively. He was among the publishers of the magazine Symra between 1902 and 1904, Norsk barneblad between 1907 and 1916 and Olsok from 1916 to 1917. He left Den 17de Mai in 1916, and worked in the newspapers Møre Tidend from 1917 to 1920 and Stavanger Aftenblad from 1923 to his retirement in 1943. He was an acting editor-in-chief while Lars Oftedal held political office.

Sletten was also involved in politics; he was a member of Stavanger city council from 1929 to 1940 as well as the school board. He was a secretary in Norges Forsvarsforening from 1913 to 1916.

He died in April 1946 in Stavanger. His son Vegard Sletten became a journalist, and chaired Noregs Ungdomslag as well.

Cultural offices
| Preceded by Sven Moren | Chairman of Noregs Ungdomslag; 1901–1906 | Succeeded by Nikolaus Gjelsvik |
