= Halvdan Wexelsen Freihow =

Halvdan Wexelsen Freihow (22 November 1883 – 20 December 1965) was a Norwegian priest and culturist.

He was born in Tana Municipality in Finnmark county, Norway. He graduated with the cand.theol. degree in 1909. In 1937 he earned the dr.philos. degree for a thesis on the psychological aspect of Henrik Ibsen's Brand. He was an avid proponent of the written language form Nynorsk, and chaired Noregs Ungdomslag from 1926 to 1936. He was later a vicar in Skien.

During the occupation of Norway by Nazi Germany he was arrested by the occupiers. He was imprisoned in Åkebergveien and Arkivet, then Grini concentration camp from 12 May to 12 June 1943.

He was the father of the diplomat Håkon Wexelsen Freihow.

Cultural offices
Preceded by Olav Midttun	Chairman of Noregs Ungdomslag; 1926–1936	Succeeded by Knut Eik-Nes
