= Ludvig Kabell =

Danish landscape painter

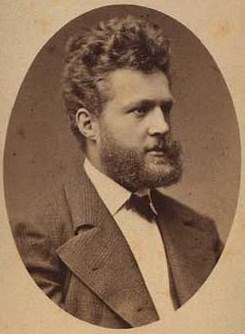
- Ludvig Kabell in 1875
- Born: Ludvig Christian Brinck-Seidelin Kabel; 21 July 1853; Vejlby, Norddjurs Municipality, Denmark
- Died: 1 February 1902 (aged 48); Fredensborg, Denmark

Ludvig Christian Brinck-Seidelin Kabell (21 July 1853 – 1 February 1902) was a Danish landscape painter. He is known for his landscape art.

== Biography ==
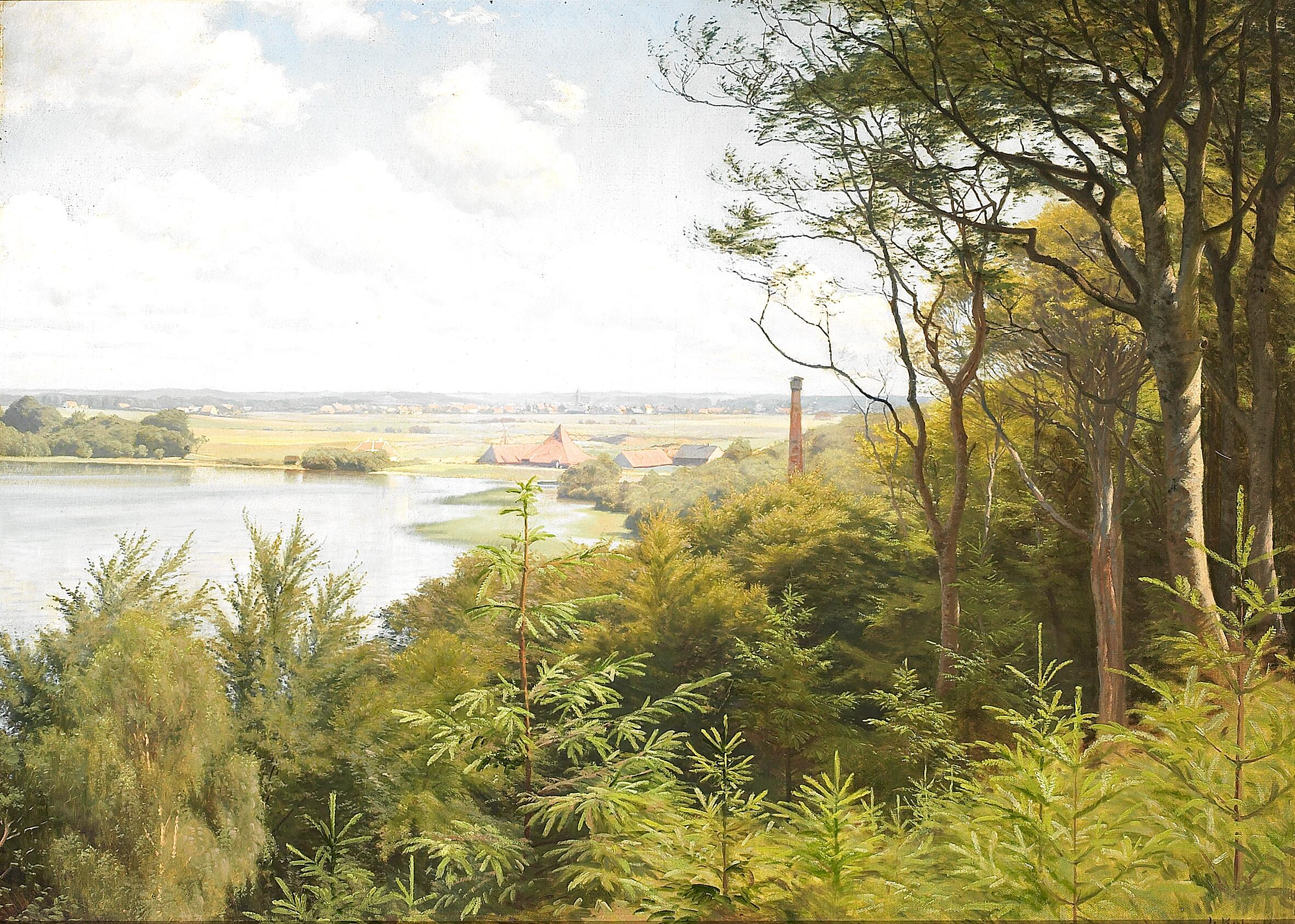
The Sanatorium on Ørnsø with Silkeborg in the Background

His father was a priest. When he was ten, the family moved to Zealand and he attended the Herlufsholm School for six years. There, his drawing skills were noticed by the painter, Georg Hilker, who took him to Copenhagen as his apprentice.

While there, he attended classes taught by P.C. Skovgaard at the Royal Danish Academy of Fine Arts, but was never formally admitted. This was the occasion, however, for making the acquaintance of Godfred Christensen, who aroused his interest in landscape painting.

He began by painting en plein aire with his friend Karl Jensen, and they mutually influenced each other's styles, although Jensen would come to focus on interior paintings.

His first major showing was at the Charlottenborg Spring Exhibition of 1878. This led to a sale of his work "Watering Hole Outside a Farmhouse" to the Kunstforeningen; an organization that would become a regular customer. He took a brief trip to Paris in 1880 then, thanks to a small stipend from the Academy, visited the Tyrol and Italy. In 1883, he was awarded the Neuhausenske Prize.

Upon returning in 1887, he married Baroness Rudolphine Wedell-Wedellsborg (1856-1920), the daughter of Baron Julius Wedell-Wedellsborg; forest administrator for the Vallø stift. In 1895, he was awarded the Eckersberg Medal.
