= Halfdan Hegtun =

Norwegian politician

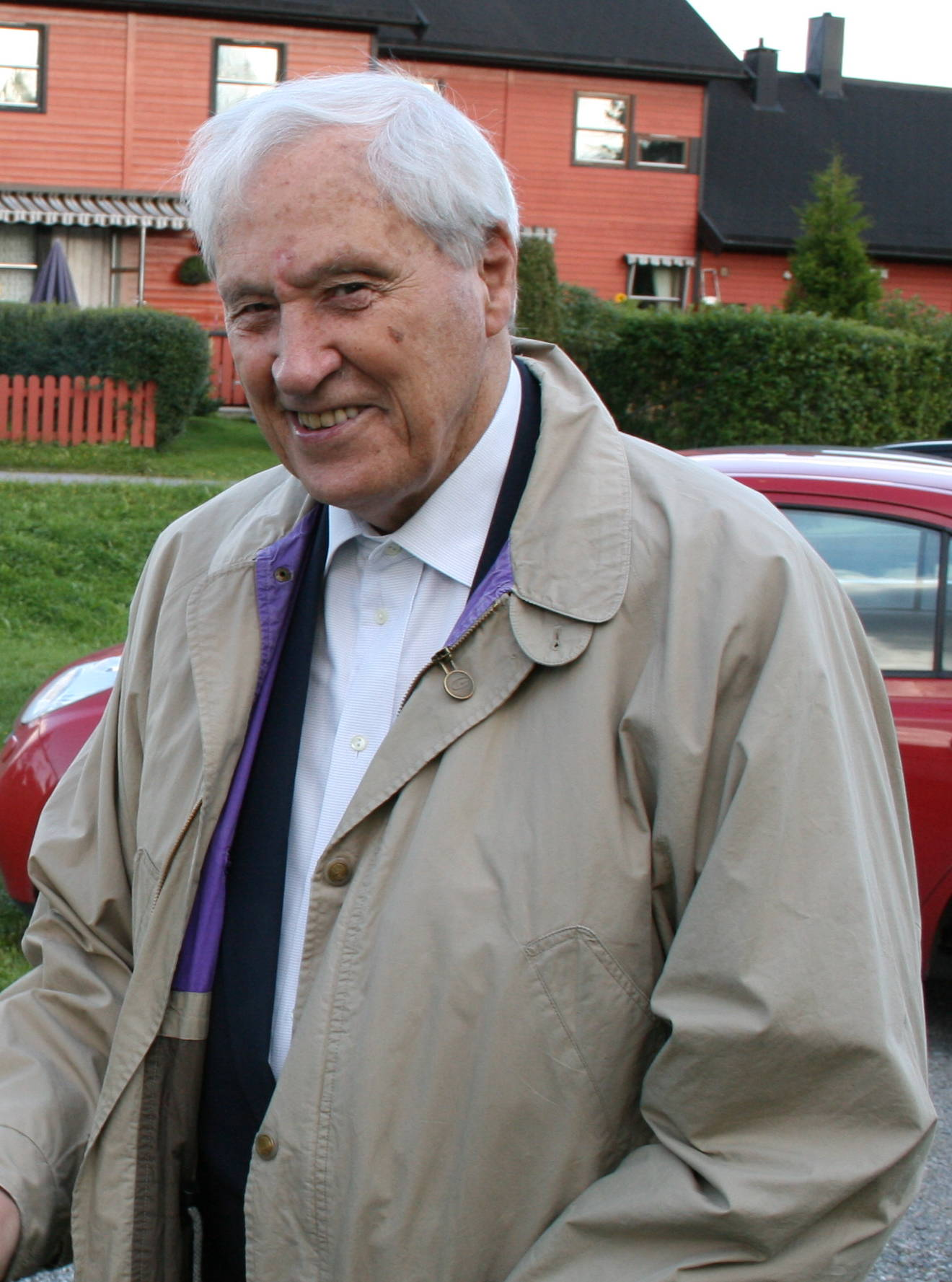
Halfdan Hegtun, 2008

Halfdan Hegtun (8 October 1918 – 25 December 2012) was a Norwegian radio personality, comedian and writer, former politician for the Liberal Party and later the Liberal People's Party.

== Politics ==
Hegtun was elected to the Norwegian Parliament from Akershus in 1965, and was re-elected on one occasion. During his second term, in December 1972, Hegtun joined the Liberal People's Party which split from the Liberal Party over disagreements of Norway's proposed entry to the European Economic Community. Like most of the Liberal People's Party representatives, he was not re-elected in 1973.

Hegtun was a member of Akershus county council during the terms 1983–1987 and 1987–1991, and was later involved in local politics in Bærum. He had rejoined the Liberal Party in 1988.

== Radio career ==
Hegtun worked for BBC in London 1946–1948, and later for NRK. He was director for NRK Radio from 1973 to 1981.

== Comedian ==
Hegtun became known for the popular figure Even Brattbakken, through vocal performances and writings. The two books Slik je ser det (1964; "As I see it"), and I kvældssola (1987, "In the evening sun") are both "signed" Even Brattbakken.

Media offices
Preceded by Torolf Elster	Director of radio in the Norwegian Broadcasting Corporation; 1973–1981	Succeeded by Gunnar Gran
