= Magne Oftedal =

Norwegian linguist (1921–1985)

- Born: 10 March 1921; Sandnes
- Died: 26 May 1985 (aged 64); Oslo
- Known for: work in Scottish Gaelic linguistics
- Scientific career
- Fields: linguistics, Celtic studies
- Workplaces: University of Oslo

Magne Oftedal (10 March 1921 – 26 May 1985) was a Norwegian linguist who carried out a large amount of comparative research on Scottish Gaelic dialects, the Celtic languages and Spanish.

He was born in Sandnes in the county of Rogaland in 1921 and began studying for a degree in philology at the University of Oslo, but his studies were interrupted by the Second World War and he only managed to complete his degree in 1947. During his time at the University of Oslo, he studied the Gaelic of Lewis between 1949 and 1954, publishing his first important paper, The village names of Lewis in the Outer Hebrides, in 1954. He was subsequently awarded a doctorate for his research into the Gaelic dialect of Leurbost, published as The Gaelic of Leurbost in 1956.

Throughout his career his main focus remained the phonology and place-names of Gaelic, Welsh and Norwegian. He became a professor at the University of Oslo after Carl Marstrander and remained there for some 30 years. He was also an editor of the publication Lochlann – A Review of Celtic Studies between 1969 and 1974, and a member and chair of numerous bodies such as the Norwegian Academy of Science and Letters (from 1958) and the Norsk Forening for Språkvitenskap. He died in 1985 in Oslo.
