= Sparbu =

- Village
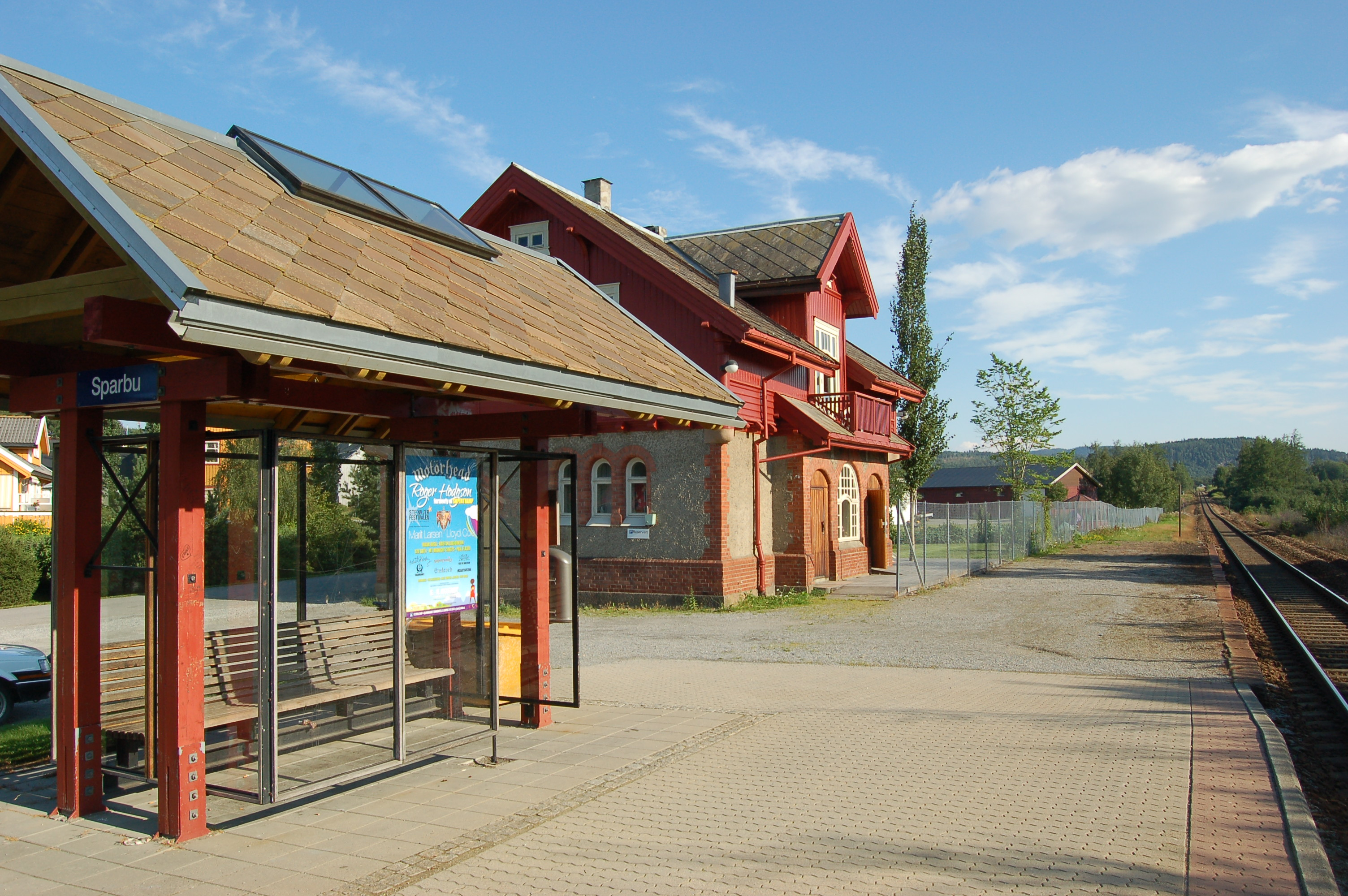
- View of the village railway station
- Interactive map of Sparbu
- Location within Trøndelag Location within Norway
- Coordinates: 63.9190°N 11.4329°E
- Country: Norway
- Region: Central Norway
- County: Trøndelag
- District: Innherred
- Municipality: Steinkjer Municipality

Area
  - Total: 0.4 km^{2} (0.15 sq mi)
- Elevation: 39 m (128 ft)

Population (2024)
  - Total: 595
  - Density: 1,488/km^{2} (3,850/sq mi)
- Time zone: UTC+01:00 (CET)
  - Summer (DST): UTC+02:00 (CEST)
- Post Code: 7710 Sparbu

Sparbu is a village in Steinkjer Municipality in Trøndelag county, Norway. The village is located about 12 kilometres (7.5 mi) south of the town of Steinkjer. The European route E6 highway runs through the village as does the Nordlandsbanen railway line which stops at the Sparbu Station. The village of Mære lies about 2 kilometres (1.2 mi) to the north, the village of Røra (in neighboring Inderøy Municipality) lies about 8 kilometres (5.0 mi) to the south, and the lake Leksdalsvatnet lies about 8 kilometres (5.0 mi) to the east.

The 0.4-square-kilometre (99-acre) village has a population (2024) of 595 and a population density of 1,488 inhabitants per square kilometre (3,850/sq mi).

The village was the administrative centre of the old Sparbu Municipality from 1838 until the dissolution of the municipality in 1964.

== Notable residents ==
- Hans Ystgaard (1882–1953), a farmer, politician, and Mayor of Sparbu
- Peder E. Vorum (1884 in Steinnes – 1970), an educator and politician for the Labour Democrats & Nasjonal Samling
- Kristen Eik-Nes (1922 in Sparbu – 1992), a medical scientist, academic, and art collector
- Jarle Benum (born 1928 in Sparbu), a Norwegian politician
- Torgeir Brandtzæg (born 1941), a ski jumper, two bronze medals in the 1964 Winter Olympics then became a farmer in Sparbu
- Mona Juul (born 1959 in Sparbu), a Norwegian Ministry of Foreign Affairs and former politician
- Sigrid Ekran, (Norwegian Wiki) (born 1980 in Sparbu), the 11th-place winner of the 2012 Iditarod
- Karl Morten Eek (born 1988 in Sparbu), a Norwegian footballer
