= Halfdan W. Freihow =

Halfdan Wexel Freihow (born 7 May 1959) is a Norwegian literary critic, novelist, editor and book publisher.

A son of diplomat Håkon Wexelsen Freihow, Halfdan Freihow was born in Mexico City and grew up in Mexico, Spain and Belgium. He graduated from the University of Oslo with a cand.mag. degree. He was a translator, publishing house consultant and literary critic for Morgenbladet, Arbeiderbladet and NRK P2 in his early career. In 1985, together with fellow literary critics André Savik and Lasse Tømte, he published an anthology named Ord for andre. The proceeds would go via the Norwegian Church Aid and Norwegian Red Cross to Ethiopia. In 1989 he became editor-in-chief for the literature periodical Vinduet. In 1990 he quit his literary critic job in Arbeiderbladet to become acting editor of Bokklubben Dagens Bok. In 1991 he went on to the publishing house Aschehoug. He remained editor of Vinduet until 1992. From 1996 to 2000 he was the director of the publishing house J. M. Stenersen Forlag.

In 2001 he released the report Den edle hensikt—helliger den midlene? about the book business for the Arts Council Norway. In 2004 Freihow wrote a book about his own son, Kjære Gabriel. It was nominated for the Brage Prize. In 2007 he was writing an authorized biography about Crown Princess Mette-Marit, but the project was stopped. Freihow issued his debut novel, Du er ikke sann, in 2009. The book was issued on Freihow's own publishing house Font Forlag, which was started in 2006.

He has been deputy leader of the Norwegian PEN. He resides in Karmøy Municipality.
