= Håkon Wexelsen Freihow =

Norwegian diplomat (1927–2019)

Håkon Wexelsen Freihow (6 April 1927 – 1 March 2019) was a Norwegian diplomat.

He graduated in political science from the University of Oslo in 1956, and started working for the Norwegian Ministry of Foreign Affairs in the same year. Early diplomatic posts include services at the embassy in Mexico, Spain and the NATO embassy in Belgium. He was an embassy councillor in Belgium from 1971, and a deputy under-secretary of state in 1979. He served as the Norwegian ambassador to Japan from 1981 to 1989 and Portugal from 1992 to 1995. As a side effect of the latter position, he was also the ambassador to Cape Verde and Guinea-Bissau from 1993 and Morocco from 1994.

From 1989 to 1992 he was a "general commissioner" for the Norwegian contribution to Seville Expo '92. It generated a lot of media coverage in the three years. After the project was finished, it was criticized for a budget deficit of 12 million kr. Freihow had been responsible for the daily affairs of the project, together with Helga Hernes and vice general commissioner Tore Tanum.

He is son of Rev. Halvdan Wexelsen Freihow and the father of writer Halfdan Wexel Freihow. He died in 2019.
