= Noregs Ungdomslag =

Norwegian cultural society

Noregs Ungdomslag (NU, literally "Norway's youth society") is a Norwegian cultural society formed in 1896. It has around 17,000 members and 450 local chapters.

== Activities ==
Among the society's activities are folk dance, theatre and the spreading of knowledge and use of traditional costumes (Norwegian: bunad). Several activities are directed towards youth and children. Some local chapters, such as Bondeungdomslaget i Oslo, run their own sports clubs (IL i BUL), or also music societies. From 1913 to 1956 the society had a shared secretariat with the Nynorsk language organization Noregs Mållag. The society has been a driving force for the building of assembly houses, coffee houses and lodging houses (Norwegian: bondeheimar), folk high schools and secondary schools.

The society works closely with institutions such as the Nynorsk theatre Det Norske Teatret and the children's magazine Norsk Barneblad. They organize dance festivals and theatre festivals.

After 1900 the societies were also active in supporting defence and the military.

== History ==
The society has its roots in a number of societies for reading and discussion formed in the last part of the 19th century, often related to the folk high schools. In a founding meeting in Trondheim in 1896 delegates from seven of the earlier formed county societies were gathered, and the national umbrella organization Noregs Ungdomslag was formed. A central task from the start was enlightenment of the people, in particular by providing speakers to the local chapters. These activities closed down when radio and other mass media became widespread. The local societies could provide libraries, organize cinema, and work for obtaining assembly houses (Norwegian: ungdomshus), often through collective voluntary work (dugnad).

== Leaders ==
Among the early leaders of the society were author Sven Moren, who chaired the society for two periods, Klaus Sletten, Nikolaus Gjelsvik, and Olav Midttun.

The current leader (chairman of the board) is Torbjørn Bergwitz Lauen while Magni Hjertenes Flyum is Secretary General.
