= Norwegian Press Association =

Press association

The Norwegian Press Association (Norwegian: Norsk Presseforbund; NP) is a Norwegian association for organizations and companies of the news media.

== History ==
The Norwegian Press Association was established in 1910 for people with journalism as their main profession. As of February 2024, its members are the Norwegian Union of Journalists, the Association of Norwegian Editors, the Norwegian Local Radio Association, the Norwegian Media Businesses' Association, the Norwegian Trade Press Association, the NRK, TV 2, Warner Bros. Discovery and Viaplay Group.

Per Edgar Kokkvold was Secretary General from 1996 to 2013, and Kjersti Løken Stavrum was Secretary General from 2013 to 2016. Elin Floberghagen took over as Secretary General in 2016.
