= Brodahl =

Brodahl is a surname. Notable people with this surname include:

- Alfred Brodahl (1890–1975), American politician from Nebraska
- Caroline Brodahl (born 1992), Norwegian handball player
- Cris Brodahl (born 1963), Belgian contemporary visual artist
- Sverre Brodahl (1909–1998), Norwegian Nordic skier
- Trygve Brodahl (1905–1996), Norwegian cross-country skier

== See also ==
- Bredahl
- Bredal
- Brodal
