= Brodal =

Brodal is a surname. Notable people with this surname include:

- Alf Brodal, Norwegian professor
- Per Alf Brodal, Norwegian professor
- Gerth Stølting Brodal
- Svein Erik Brodal (born 1939), Norwegian actor, poet, novelist, and politician

== See also ==
- Bredahl
- Bredal
- Brodahl
