= Christian A. R. Christensen =

Norwegian newspaper editor (1906–1967)

Christian A. R. Christensen (17 December 1906 – 27 January 1967) was a Norwegian newspaper editor. He is known for his work in the Norwegian resistance movement, as editor of Verdens Gang and as a historical writer. He also helped shape the Ethical Code of Practice for the Norwegian Press.

== Early life ==
He was born in Solum Municipality as a son of merchant Nils Christian Christensen (1872–1957) and his wife Ellen Kristine Reiersen (1883–1953). He was a brother of Nils-Reinhardt Christensen. Following miscellaneous education, he was hired in Dagbladet in 1926. In 1933 he married Else Marie Østvedt (1906–1982). They lived in Vestre Aker. In 1934 Christensen was hired in the publishing house Aschehoug. He also wrote news analyses for the Norwegian Broadcasting Corporation radio. Also, Christiansen was a deputy member of the Liberal Party of Norway national board.

== World War II ==
In 1940, Norway was invaded and occupied by Germany as a part of World War II. Christiansen participated for the Liberal Party in early negotiations with the occupying power, but as Germany seized tighter control in September 1940 Christiansen joined the Norwegian resistance, and acted as a middle man between the Norwegian press and the Home Front. He co-founded the written organ of the Home Front, Bulletinen. A co-founder was Einar Gerhardsen, and editors were Christensen, Olaf Solumsmoen and Olav Larssen. Christensen also wrote news analyses for several illegal newspapers. He was arrested by the Nazi authorities in late February 1941, for "spying", and sat for three months at Møllergata 19 and for five days in Grini concentration camp. While at Møllergata 19 he penned the crime novel Telefon til myrdede, issued in 1942. He also continued writing news analyses, which were smuggled out of the prison. Upon release in late May 1942, he continued his work. In 1943 he was arrested for the second time. Via Gjerpen and Larvik he was brought to Grini, and sat there from 19 to 31 August.

== Later career ==
After the war, some members of the Home Front discussed a restart of the newspaper Tidens Tegn, but this did not go through. Instead a new newspaper with roots in the Home Front was created, with Christensen as editor-in-chief: Verdens Gang. He remained editor-in-chief until his death. From 1953 he co-edited with Oskar Hasselknippe, and he was succeeded by Vegard Sletten. Despite initial hardships, the newspaper grew influent and has been the largest in Norway since 1981. In 1963 it assumed the tabloid format as the first in Norway, reportedly to Christensen's dismay. Christensen also chaired the Norwegian Press Association from 1958 to 1962, and was instrumental in establishing the Rights and Duties of the Editor code in 1953 and for the revision of the Ethical Code of Practice for the Norwegian Press in 1956. This was the first revision since the code's inauguration in 1936.

He also participated in the non-press sphere after the war; already in 1944 he helped shape the Common Platform (Fellesprogrammet) which was meant to unite political parties in Norway after the war. In May 1945 he supported Paal Berg, head of Hjemmefrontens Ledelse in his endeavors to create a broad, non-partisan coalition. The road was open as the pre-war cabinet Nygaardsvold resigned, but the increasingly popular Communist Party were particularly skeptical to Berg, and the Conservative President of the Storting C. J. Hambro got his way in reconvening the pre-war Parliament of Norway. Berg faced unexpected opposition from this Parliament, and gave up on 20 June. Instead Einar Gerhardsen formed a cabinet, and also won the first free post-war election.

Christensen was a board member of the Norwegian Institute of International Affairs and the Norwegian News Agency. In addition, he continued his writing of historical books. Notable works included Fra verdenskrig til verdenskrig ('From World War to World War') and Okkupasjonsår og etterkrigstid ('Occupation Years and Post-war Era'), volumes eight and nine of the series Vårt folks historie ('Our People's History'), both issued in 1961. He died of a heart attack while on a cruise in 1967, in a hospital in Las Palmas.

Media offices
Preceded by Per Monsen	Chairman of the Norwegian Press Association; 1958–1962	Succeeded by Vegard Sletten
