= Johannes Wilhelm Christian Dietrichson =

Norwegian Lutheran minister

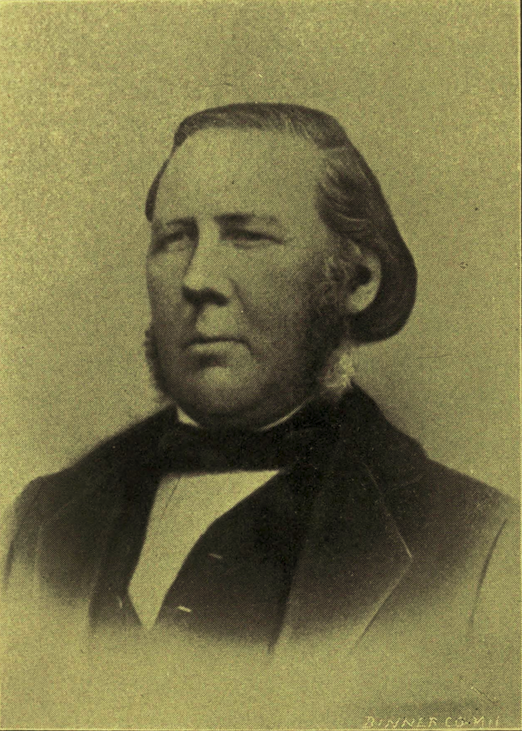
Portrait photo from The first chapter of Norwegian immigration, 1896

Johannes Wilhelm Christian Dietrichson (4 April 1815 – 15 October 1883) was a Norwegian Lutheran minister.

== Early life ==
Dietrichson was born in Fredriksstad in Smaalenenes Amt, Norway to Fredrik Dietrichson (1787–1866) and Karen Sophie Henriette Radich (1794–1867). Through his sister he was an uncle of Johan Scharffenberg, and he was also a distant relative of Norwegian politician and labor leader, Wilhelm Dietrichson (1880-1949).

== Career ==
He grew up and attended school in Fredriksstad where his teachers included Hans Riddervold. He graduated from the Royal Frederick University in Christiania in 1837. He was present at the Norwegian Missionary Society national convention in 1843. After being ordained as a Lutheran minister in February 1844, he immigrated to the United States, arriving on 9 July 1844.

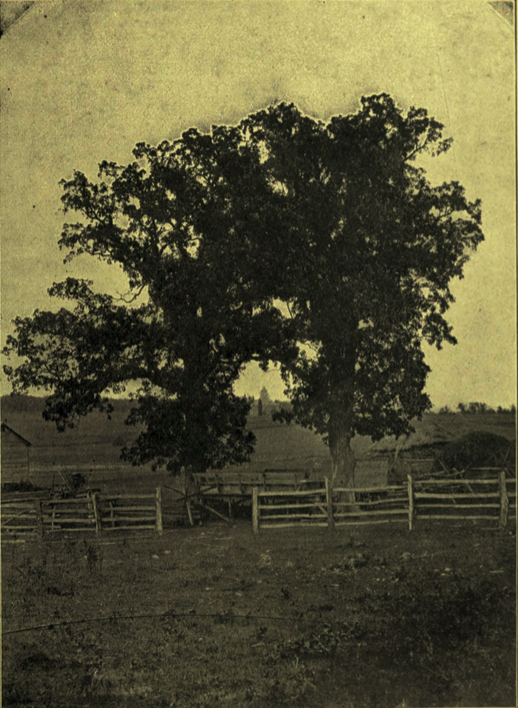
Knud Aslakson Juve's farm where Rev. Dietrichson preached Sept. 2, 1844.

On 31 January 1845, the East Koshkonong Lutheran Church was dedicated on a half-acre plot of land he had purchased. He served as pastor at Koshkonong, where he maintained detailed records of parish membership and pastoral activities. He authored Travels among the Norwegian Emigrants in The United North American Free States (Norwegian: Reise blandt de norske emigranter i “De Forenede nordamerikanske fristater) which was published in Stavanger. After Dietrichson questioned the validity of clergymen who had been ordained in America, he clashed with lay leader Elling Eielsen.

Dietrichson returned to Norway in 1850 where he subsequently held two pastorates, first in Nedstrand Church and then in Østre Moland Church. Following this, he was appointed postmaster at Porsgrund until 1882. He died in October 1883 in Copenhagen.

== Personal life ==
In November 1839, he married Jørgine Laurentze Broch (1816–1841). She died in childbirth in 1841, and Johannes Dietrichson re-married to Charlotte Josine Omsen Müller (1819–1903) in June 1846.

== Other sources ==
- A Pioneer Churchman:: J.W.C. Dietrichson in Wisconsin, 1844-1850 (by Johannes Wilhelm Christian Dietrichson. Edited by E. Clifford Nelson. Malcolm Rosholt and Harris E. Kaasa, translators. Published for the Norwegian-American Historical Association by Twayne Publishers. 1973)
