= Jan B. Jansen =

- Born: 25 September 1898; Horten
- Died: 28 November 1984 (aged 86)
- Occupation: Physician
- Children: Jan K. S. Jansen
- Awards: Order of St. Olav (1963)

Jan Birger Jansen (25 September 1898 – 24 November 1984) was a Norwegian physician, anatomist and scientist, specializing in brain research. He played an important role in the Norwegian civil resistance during the Second World War.

== Personal life ==
He was born in Horten as a son of captain James Christian Jansen (1868–1912) and Ananda Kristine Jacobsen (1874–1961). In August 1925 in Frederiksvern he married merchant's daughter Helene Sofie Schøning (1902–1976). They had the son Jan K. S. Jansen and daughters Grete Schøning Jansen Kohler and Ingrid Schøning Jansen Murer-Knutzen.

== Career ==
He finished his secondary education in Horten in 1917 and studied at the Royal Frederick University, graduating with the cand.med. degree in 1924. He was hired as a prosector there in 1926, studied with a Rockefeller Grant under C. Judson Herrick at the University of Chicago from 1927 to 1929, and back in Norway he took the dr.med. degree in 1931 with the thesis The brain of Myxine glutinosa. He continued as a researcher at the University of Chicago, and was a professor from 1945 to 1966. He was the Europe-based editor for the Journal of Comparative Neurology. Together with Alf Brodal he is credited with founding the "Oslo School" of brain research. His research speciality was the cerebellum, but in addition to the human brain, Jansen did research on cetacean brains. He also did research in neuropathology and published textbooks in anatomy and histology, and published three books based on Olof Larssell's work after Larssell died.

During the Second World War, Jansen participated in the Norwegian resistance movement from 1940 onwards. He edited the illegal newspaper Bulletinen from 1941; from 1942 to 1944 as the sole editor, and was a member of the so-called Coordination Committee (Norwegian: Koordinasjonskomiteen (KK)). He had to flee to Sweden in 1944.

In 1961 Jansen stood forward as a member of Landsforbundet for folkeavstemning, a lobby organization which worked to include the institution of referendums in the Norwegian Constitution.

Jansen was decorated Commander of the Royal Norwegian Order of St. Olav in 1963. He was a member of the Norwegian Academy of Science and Letters, and an honorary doctor of the University of Kiel, the University of Leiden and the University of Århus.

== Selected bibliography ==
- The brain of Myxine glutinosa (thesis, 1930)
- Aspects of cerebral anatomy (with Alf Brodal, 1954)
- Das Kleinhirn (with Alf Brodal, 1958)
- The Comparative Anatomy and Histology of the Cerebellum (based on Olof Larsell's work, 1967–1972)
