= Maurice Bourguin =

French law professor (1856–1910)

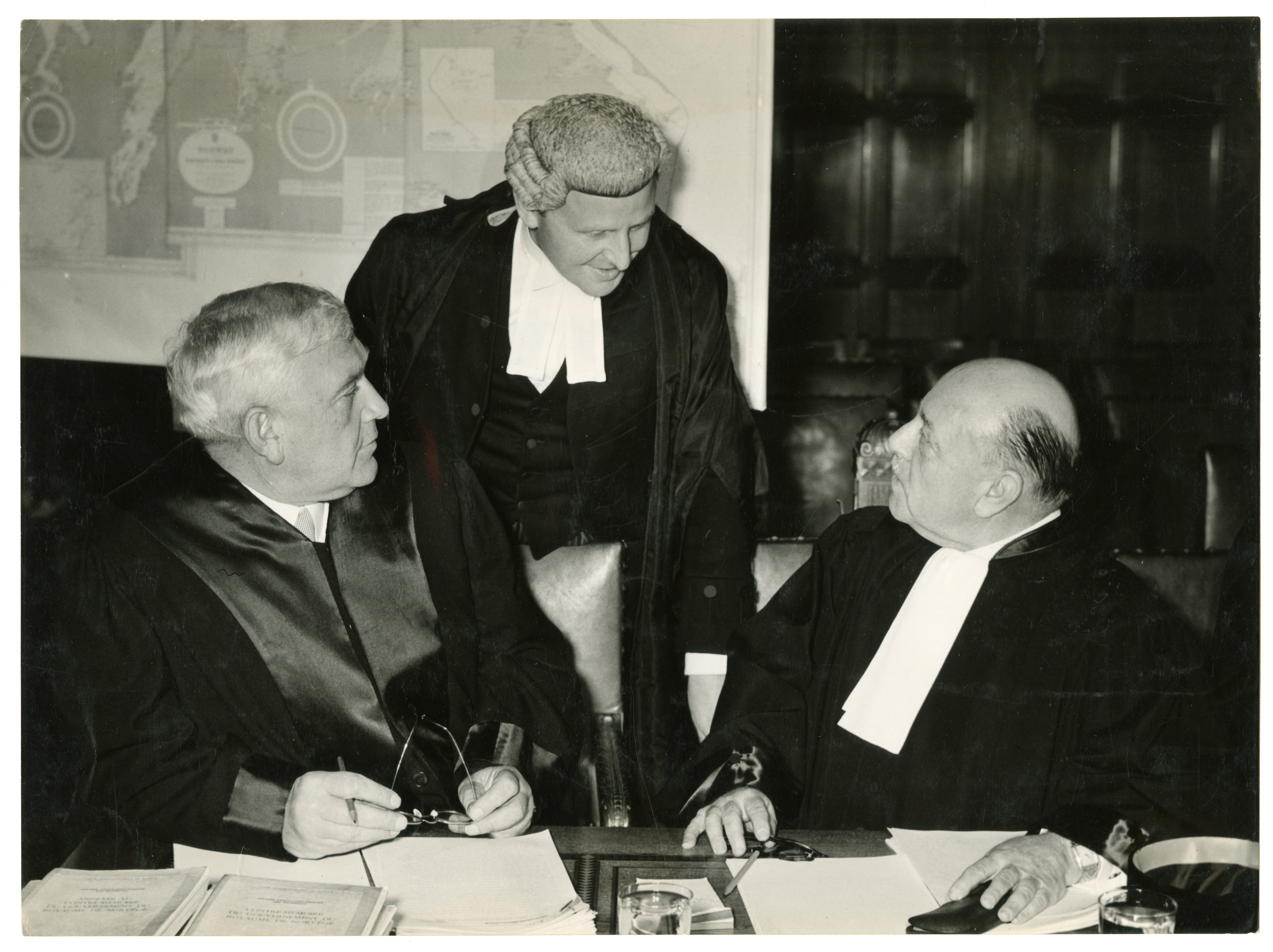
Bourguin (right) with Sven Arntzen (left) and Frank Soskice in the Peace Palace, The Hague, 1951

Maurice Marie Victor Bourguin (10 December 1856 Chateau-Thierry – 19 January 1910) was a French law professor.

Bourguin started his career at the University of Douai, where he taught administrative law. He moved to the University of Lille

== Works ==
- "Des rapports entre Proudhon et Marx" in Revue d'Economie Politique, Paris, March 1893, Vol. 7, No. 3 pp 177–207
- La mesure de la valeur et la monnaie (1896)
- Les systèmes socialistes et l'évolution économique (1913)
