= Bredal =

Bredal is a surname. Notable people with this surname include:

- Erik Bredal
- Anne Margrethe Bredal
- Ivar Bredal
- Peter Bredal
- Johan Olaf Bredal
- Wilhelm Engel Bredal
- Stine Bredal Oftedal
- Hanna Bredal Oftedal
- Wilhelm Olssøn (Christian Wilhelm Engel Bredal Olssøn)

== See also ==
- Bredahl
- Brodal
- Brodahl
