= Bulletinen =

Norwegian underground newspaper

Bulletinen ("The Bulletin") was an underground newspaper in Norway during World War II. Its first issue came in November 1940, and the publication continued until the end of the war. The name Bulletinen was adapted in November 1944. It was edited by central persons of the civil resistance in Norway, such as members of "Koordinasjonskomiteen" and "Kretsen" Jan Birger Jansen and Tore Gjelsvik.

== Publishing history ==
The periodical was started as a link between organizations connected to the so-called R-Group, after an initiative from later prime minister Einar Gerhardsen. Responsible for the bi-weekly bulletin was the propaganda group, headed by Christian A. R. Christensen, and the first editors were Olav Larssen and Olaf Solumsmoen. The first issue was published 18 November 1940. When Solumsmoen and Larssen were arrested in January 1942, sports leaders Asbjørn Halvorsen and Gunnar Hansen took over as editors. Halvorsen and Hansen were arrested in August 1942, and Jan Birger Jansen took over as the sole editor, only informing other resistance members that he had contacts to the editorial staff, while in fact he was the single responsible editor himself. In February 1944 the German occupants unraveled several underground newspapers, such as London-Nytt, London Radio, Svart på hvitt, Vårt Land and Fri Fagbevegelse, which all had to cease publication. Among the newspapers which had distributed informations and paroles from the civil leadership of the resistance movement, only Bulletinen was intact after the press collapse. In May 1944 Jansen had to flee to Sweden, and asked Tore Gjelsvik to take over. Jansen and Gjelsvik had cooperated since 1940, then at the distribution side. Gjelsvik was rather busy with other resistance work, and asked Christian A. R. Christensen and Tore Sund to join as editors.

A total of about 150 issues of Bulletinen were produced during the war. The publication had limited circulation, as it was primarily aimed to distribute news, comments and paroles to other underground newspapers.
