= Lisa Johansen Persheim =

Norwegian handball player (born 1990)

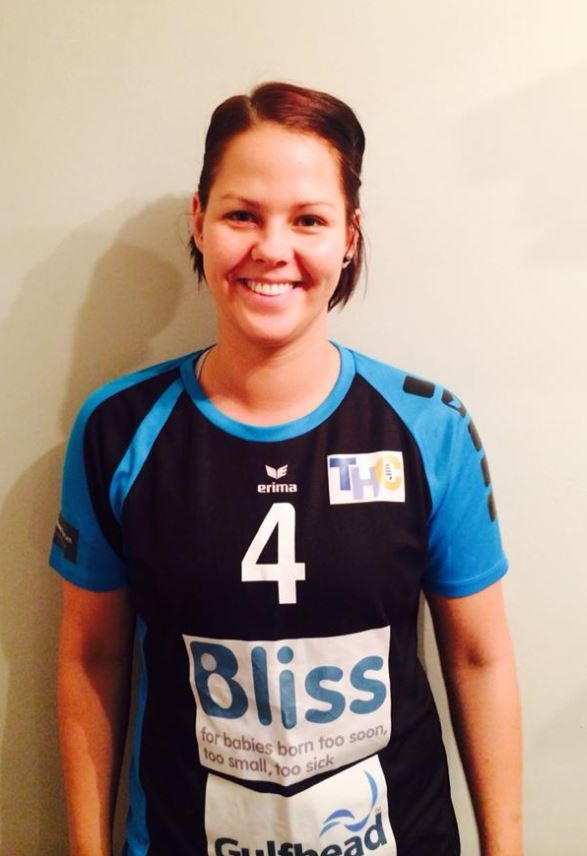

Personal information
- Nationality: Norwegian
- Born: 21 June 1990 (age 36) Oslo, Norway
- Height: 1.68 m (5 ft 6 in)

Sport
- Sport: Handball
- Position: Right back
- Current club: Thames Handball Club
- Number: 4

Youth career
- Years: Team
- 2004-2009: Ellingsrud IL

Senior clubs
- Years: Team
- 2009–2011: Ellingsrud IL

Lisa Johansen Persheim (born 21 June 1990) is a Norwegian team handball player. She plays for the club Thames Handball Club. She started her playing career at her club Ellingsrud IL in the junior section and later on participated in the Sparserien league in Norway. In 2014/15 she participated in the Women's EHF Challenge Cup Round 3 where a highly unusual result of identical scores was recorded on both playing dates
