= Per Alf Brodal =

Norwegian professor of medicine

Per Alf Brodal (born 17 October 1944) is a Norwegian professor of medicine.

He was born in Oslo. He was a son of professor of anatomy Alf Brodal, and thus a nephew of violinist Jon Brodal and psalm writer Anne Margarethe "Pus" Brodal.

He finished his secondary education at Valler in 1963. He took the cand.med. degree at the University of Oslo in 1971 and the dr.med. degree already in 1972. He was appointed as a professor at the University of Oslo in 1985. He is known for completely revamping the education plan for medicine students in Oslo, and also for his textbook on neurobiology.

He resides at Lønnås.
