= Olimpia Lopes DaVeiga =

Portuguese handball player (born 1985)

Olimpia Lopes Da Veiga
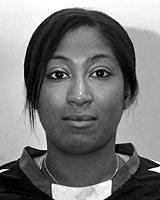

Personal information
- Nationality: Portuguese
- Born: 6 May 1985 (age 41) Alcochete, Portugal
- Height: 1.71 m (5 ft 7 in)

Sport
- Sport: Handball
- Position: Right Back
- Current club: Thames Handball Club
- Number: 24

Youth career
- Years: Team
- 1996–2000: S.U. 1º de Dezembro

Senior clubs
- Years: Team
- 2000–2003: S.U. 1º de Dezembro
- 2005–2006: Cambridge HC
- 2011–2012: Olympia HC

Olimpia Lopes Da Veiga (born 6 May 1985) is a Portuguese team handball player. She plays for the club Thames Handball Club.

In the 2011/2012 season she represented the Olympia Handball club at the 2011 Women's EHF Challenge Cup in Oliveira do Bairro (Portugal). Her goal tally during the Challenge Cup was five goals. During 2011/2012 she was crowned top goalscorer at Thames HC. In 2014/15 she participated again in the Women's EHF Challenge Cup Round 3 where a highly unusual result of identical scores was recorded on both playing dates
