= Jørgen Nordvik =

Norwegian jurist (1895–1977)

Jørgen Kornelius Nordvik (28 November 1895 – 21 July 1977) was a Norwegian jurist.

He was a member of the party Nasjonal Samling before the Second World War and worked as an attorney in Lillehammer. In 1940 he participated for Norway in battles near Høytorp Fort. However, during the subsequent occupation of Norway by Nazi Germany a career path opened for him. In February 1941 he was appointed as Norwegian Director of Public Prosecutions to replace Haakon Sund who had been fired for anti-German sentiments.

During the legal purge in Norway after World War II he was convicted of treason, and sentenced to fourteen years of forced labour. He died in 1977 and was buried at Vestre gravlund.

Legal offices
Preceded by Haakon Sund	Norwegian Director of Public Prosecutions (collaborator); 1941–1945	Succeeded by Sven Arntzen (acting)
