= Molandsvann =

Lake in Agder, Norway

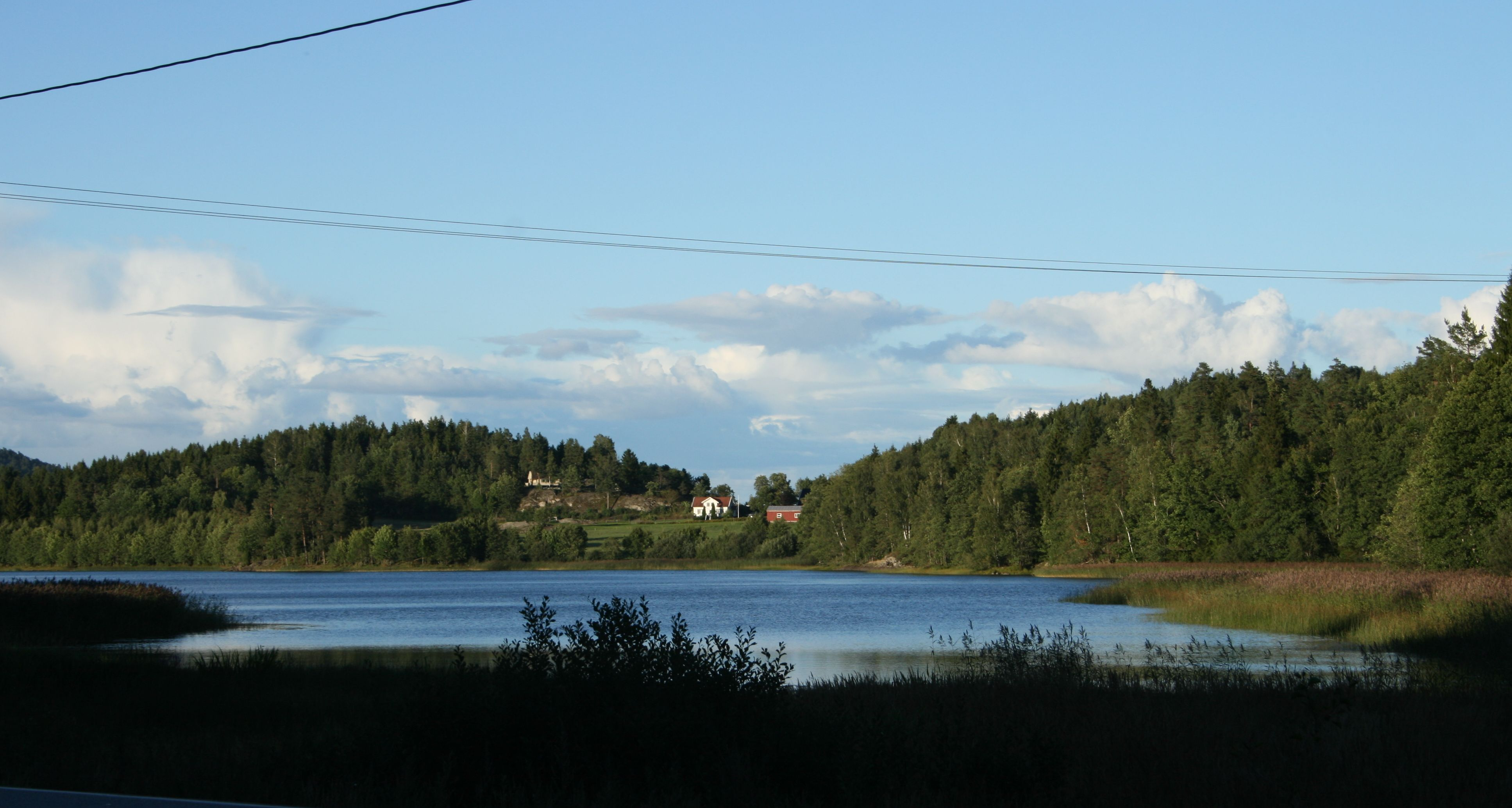
- Interactive map of Molandsvann
- Location: Arendal Municipality, Agder
- Coordinates: 58.54322°N 8.81825°E
- Basin countries: Norway
- Max. length: 3.2 kilometres (2.0 mi)
- Max. width: 1.9 kilometres (1.2 mi)
- Surface area: 1.4478 km^{2} (0.5590 sq mi)
- Surface elevation: 28 metres (92 ft)
- References: NVE

Molandsvann is a lake in Arendal Municipality in Agder county, Norway. The 1.4-square-kilometre (0.54 sq mi) lake lies just southeast of the village of Brekka and about 10 kilometres (6.2 mi) north of the town of Arendal. Norwegian county road 421 runs along the western shore of the lake and the Austre Moland Church sits along the shore of the lake.

== See also ==
- List of lakes in Norway
