= Th. Hasle =

Norwegian civil servant

Th. Hasle (1883/84–1964) was a Norwegian civil servant.

He started working with postal administration in 1914, and was later hired in the Ministry of Trade. He was promoted to assistant secretary in 1937. In 1946 he was promoted to deputy under-secretary of state in the Ministry of Transport and Communications, and he was also a member of Statens lønnskommisjon av 1946. He retired in 1954, and was decorated with the Royal Norwegian Order of St. Olav in the same year. From 1961 he was the secretary-general of Landsforbundet for folkeavstemning, a lobby organization which worked to include the institution of referendums in the Norwegian Constitution. He died in 1964 at 80 years old.
