= Alf Brodal =

Norwegian professor of anatomy

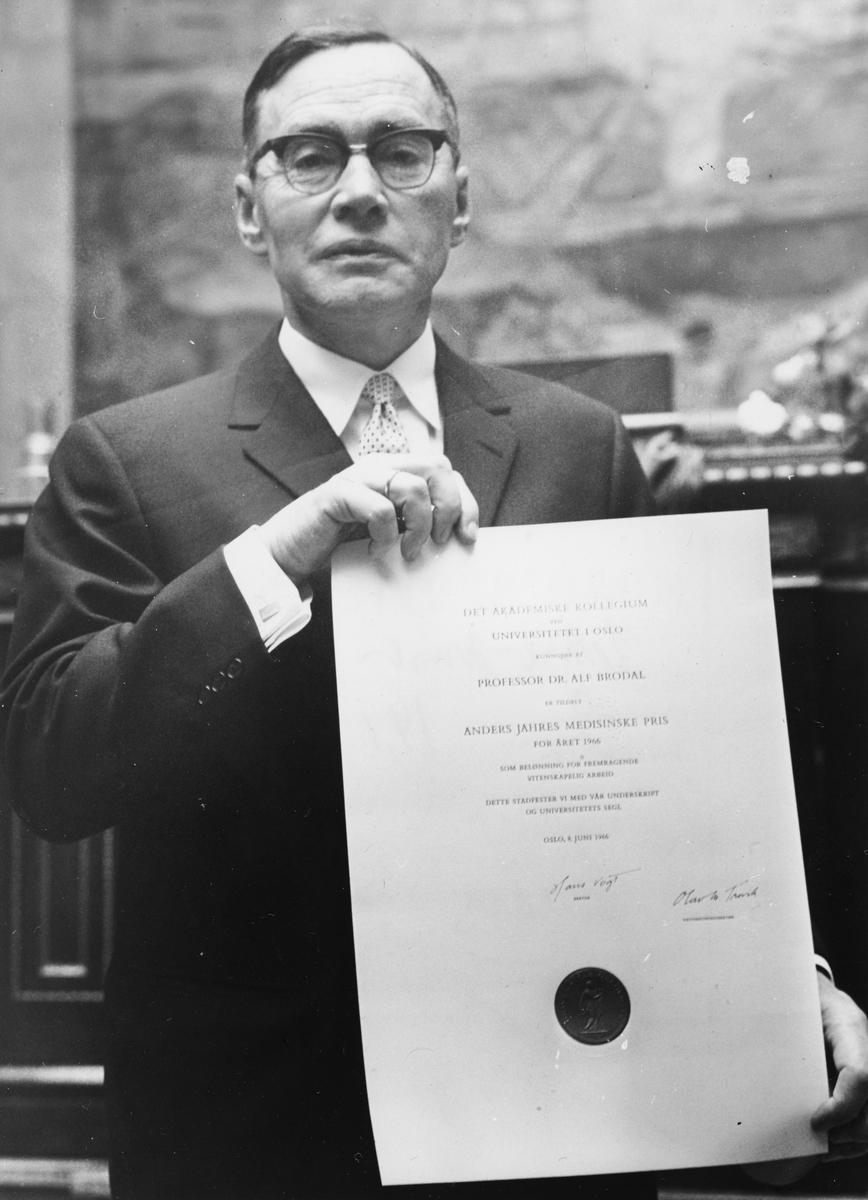
- Born: 25 January 1910; Kristiania (now Oslo)
- Died: 29 February 1988 (aged 78); Bærum
- Citizenship: Norwegian
- Awards: Royal Norwegian Order of St. Olav; Several honorary degrees
- Scientific career
- Fields: neuroanatomy
- Institutions: University of Oslo professor 1950–1977

Alf Brodal (25 January 1910 – 29 February 1988) was a Norwegian professor of anatomy.

== Personal life ==
He was born in Kristiania as a son of the doctor of engineering Peter Brodal (1872–1935) and his wife Helene Kathrine Obenauer (1879–1934). He was a brother of violinist Jon Brodal (1911–1998) and psalm writer Anne Margarethe Brodal (1914–1999). Brodal was married to physiotherapist Inger Olivia Hannestad (1910–1986). He died in 1988 in Bærum. Their son Per Alf Brodal also became a professor of medicine.

== Career ==
He finished his secondary education in 1929 and the cand.med. degree in 1937. He took the dr.med. degree in 1940 on the thesis Experimentelle Untersuchungen über die olivocerebellare Lokalisation. He was hired at the University of Oslo in 1943, and was promoted to professor in 1950. He was a specialist in neuroanatomy, and was particularly interested in the cerebellum, the reticular substance and the vestibular nuclei. He worked closely with Jan Birger Jansen.

His books include Nevro-anatomi i relasjon til klinisk nevrologi (1943), the translation Neurological Anatomy in Relation to Clinical Medicine (1st edition 1948),(2d edition 1969,(3d edition 1981) and Centralnervesystemet (1949). In 1973, after suffering a stroke the previous year, he wrote an unusual article, Self-Observations and Neuro-Anatomical Considerations After a Stroke, published in the journal Brain. He chaired the editorial committee of the Norwegian journal Tidsskrift for Den norske Lægeforening from 1959 to 1975. He also had a considerable catalogue of publications in popular science.

Brodal served as the dean of the Faculty of Medicine from 1964 to 1966, and as vice rector from 1967 to 1969 under rector Hans Vogt. From 1966 to 1969 he was a member of Hovedkomiteen for norsk forskning. He retired as a professor in 1977.

Brodal was a member of the Norwegian Academy of Science and Letters from 1944 to his death. He received honorary degrees at Uppsala University (1966), University of Paris (1975) and the University of Oxford (1983). He was decorated as a Knight of the Order of St. Olav in 1969, and was promoted to Commander of the same order in 1980.

Academic offices
Preceded by	Dean of the Faculty of Medicine, University of Oslo; 1964–1966	Succeeded by
