= Brekka =

Village in Arendal Municipality, Norway

- Village
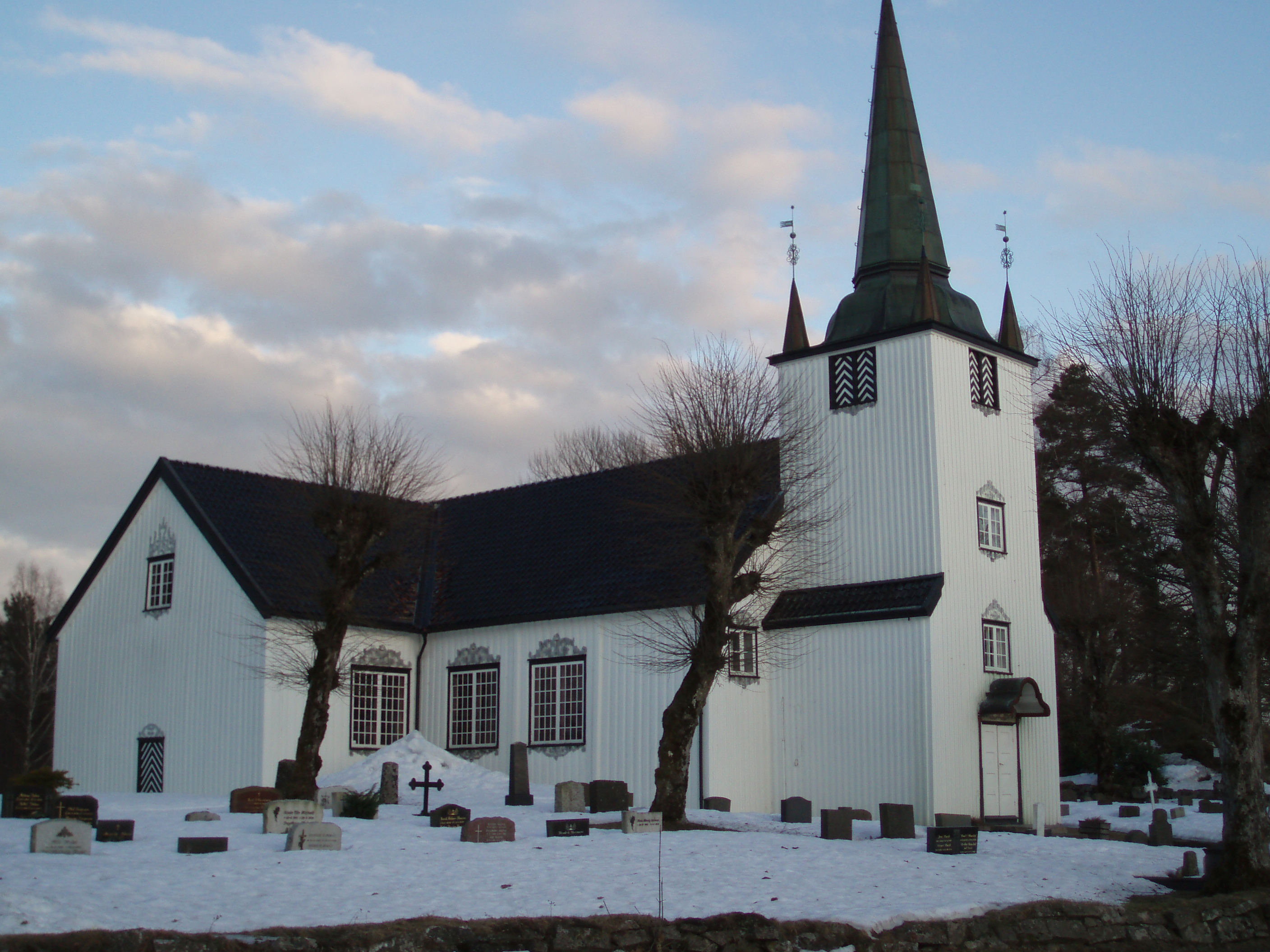
- The village church
- Interactive map of Brekka
- Coordinates: 58.54832°N 8.80554°E
- Country: Norway
- Region: Southern Norway
- County: Agder
- District: Østre Agder
- Municipality: Arendal Municipality
- Elevation: 43 m (141 ft)
- Time zone: UTC+01:00 (CET)
  - Summer (DST): UTC+02:00 (CEST)
- Post Code: 4849 Arendal

Brekka is a village in Arendal Municipality in Agder county, Norway. The village is located along the European route E18 highway on the western shore of the lake Molandsvann. Brekka sits about 11 kilometres (6.8 mi) north of the town of Arendal and the village of Longum lies about 4.5 kilometres (2.8 mi) to the south. Austre Moland Church is located in this village.

== History ==
Brekka was the administrative centre of the old Austre Moland Municipality (from 1838 until 1962).
