= Thames Handball Club =

English handball club

- Full name: Thames Handball Club
- Short name: THC
- Founded: 2005
- Arena: St Mary's University College, Twickenham
- Capacity: 150
- President: (Germany) Frank Wuggenig
- Head coach: (Algeria) Abdelhouhab Bougherara
- League: England Super 8, EHA Championship & RDL London
- 2014/15: 6th place (Super 8 League)
- Club colours
Home	Away

Thames Handball Club is an amateur handball club founded in 2005 in London, UK. It is affiliated to the England Handball Association and currently runs competitive men's handball team in Development leagues. The women's team voluntarily withdrew from official competition in 2016/17 and plays in a newly formed Handball Union.

== History ==
The club started with Junior teams, before getting involved in Senior competitions in 2007, first starting with a women's team, then in 2008 adding a Men's team. Both teams competed in the England Handball League. The women's team in Division 1 and the Men's team in Division II.

The club has enjoyed particular success in mixed team events and competitions, such as the Brentwood Mixed Team competition and the Oxford Open Mixed team competition. Both of which were won in 2011, 2012 and 2013. Of the Men's team, Chris Higgins made the selection into the Ireland men's national handball team in 2012. Of the women's team, Ulrike Stange now Ulrike Mertesacker, after her wedding to Arsenal ace Per Mertesacker played for the German National squad up until 2010.

== Recent performance ==
- 1st place in London Handball Association Cup 2011.
- 1st place in Brentwood Mixed Team Tournament 2011.
- 1st place in Brentwood Mixed Team Tournament 2012.
- 1st place in Brentwood Mixed Team Tournament 2013.
- 2nd place in British Beach Handball Championship 2013.
- 2nd place in Super 7 National League 2014
- 2nd place in 1st Division RDL 2015.
- 2nd place in Championship South 2015.
- 3rd place in Beach Handball Cup London 2015.
- 1st place RDL London 2016/17 men's league.
- 1st place Beach Handball London 2016.
- 1st place u15 league South England.

== International honours ==
- 3rd round European Challenge Cup 2014/15

== Men's team ==
The men's team won the Regional Division II in 2011 and more recently achieved first place in the SportHouse London Handball League 2012/13. In season 2014/15 the men's team came second in both the national Championship South and the London Development League.

== Women's team ==
Playing in the National League, the women achieved a Third place in 2011/12 after a decisive final day of the EHA League by beating London GD Handball Club by 2 goals and in 2012/13 was runner up in the EHA National Cup competition in 2013. The team was runner up in the inaugurated Super 7 league created in 2013/14. In previous seasons the women's team won the London Cup competition in 2009 and 2011. In 2014/15 the women's team participated in the Women's EHF Challenge Cup Round 3 where a highly unusual result of identical scores was recorded on both playing dates

=== Current women squad ===
Squad for the 2015–16 season

Goalkeepers

- 1 (Poland) Anita Rylow
- 16 (Norway) Amalie Lovaas Flaethe

Wingers

- 8 (Portugal) Maria Kourdoulos
- 20 (Germany) Ulrike Stange
- 9 (United Kingdom) Paula Mazur
- 46 (Poland) Ola Marcinkowska
- 14 (Norway) Nadia Risnes
- 17 (United Kingdom) Anna Hampshire

Line players

- 3 (Romania) Cristina Matei
- 12 (Norway) Caroline Brodahl
- 10 (Poland) Agata Garbowska
- 19 (Sweden) Hanna Finell

Back players

- 6 (Portugal) Olimpia Lopes DaVeiga
- 11 (Romania) Loredana Lupu
- 13 (Spain) Arantzazu Marin Pacheco
- 15 (Hungary) Nikolett Szollos-Wendler

=== Transfer signings ===
- 2 (Hungary) Zsofia Nyakas
- 18 (Sweden) Malin Alders

=== Notable former players ===
- (Faroe Islands) Karonlina Hentze
- (France) Fatimata Niang
- (Norway) Kaia Tufteland
- (United Kingdom) Maddie Edwards
- (Hungary) Krisztina Toth
- (Hungary) Nikoletta Papp
- (Slovakia) Marianna Meryova
- (Germany) Agnes Foeglein
- (United Kingdom) Nikoletta Rau
- (Norway) Lisa Johansen Persheim
- (Norway) Charlotte Morkken
- (Spain) Maria Garcia Pedrosa
- (Argentina) Micaela Casasola
