= Ulrike Stange =

German handball player (born 1984)

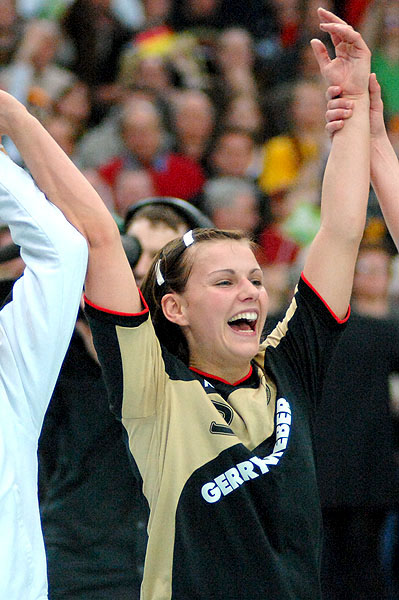
- Stange in 2008

Personal information
- Full name: Ulrike Stange
- Nationality: German
- Born: 25 April 1984 (age 42) Oschatz, East Germany
- Height: 1.69 m (5 ft 7 in)

Sport
- Sport: Handball
- Position: Right wing
- Current club: Thames HC
- Number: 20

Youth career
- Years: Team
- 1990–1998: SHV Oschatz
- 1998–2003: HC Leipzig

Senior clubs
- Years: Team
- 2003–2005: Borussia Dortmund
- 2005–2009: HC Leipzig
- 2009–2010: VfL Oldenburg
National team
Years	Team	Apps	(Gls)
2005–	Germany	38	(63)
Medal record
World Championship
Bronze medal – third place	2007 France	Team

Ulrike Mertesacker (née Stange; born 25 April 1984) is a German former professional handball player. She played for several top-flight handball clubs and the Germany national team in her seven years as a professional. Since 2011 she has lived in London with her husband, Arsenal Academy manager and retired footballer Per Mertesacker, and last played for amateur side Thames Handball Club.

== Early life ==
Stange began playing handball from an early age as her mother and grandmother were both former handball players. At the age of 14, she moved to Leipzig to join HC Leipzig's youth academy and boarded at the Landesgymnasium für Sport Leipzig, one of the region's most elite sports gymnasiums.

== Club career ==
From 1998 to 2003, and again from 2005 onwards, Stange played on the right wing position at Handball-Bundesliga club HC Leipzig. Between 2003 und 2005 she was on loan to Borussia Dortmund. In 2009 she won with HC Leipzig the German championship. That same year she chose not to see out the final year of her contract and opted to move to VfL Oldenburg to be nearer to her partner (later husband), German footballer Per Mertesacker, who was then playing for Werder Bremen. In October 2010 Stange announced her decision quit professional handball due to her pregnancy. She played for amateur club Thames Handball Club in London, where she resides with her family, prior to the birth of her second child.

== International career ==
Stange made her international debut for the Germany national team on 4 March 2005 against Croatia. At the 2007 World Women's Handball Championship she won a bronze medal with Germany. She missed out on the 2008 Olympics after rupturing her anterior cruciate ligament (ACL) during a pre-tournament friendly against Cuba. She has 38 caps (63 goals).

Stange and her husband were named as ambassadors for the 2017 World Women's Handball Championship hosted by Germany.

== Personal life ==
Stange married German footballer Per Mertesacker on 22 June 2013. and they have two sons (born April 2011 and May 2014). They began a relationship after first meeting in 2008 while both were recovering from injury at a rehab clinic in Donaustauf.

== Honours and awards ==
- German Championship Winner 2006, 2009
- DHB-Cup (Women) Winner 2006, 2007, 2008
- DHB-Supercup Winner 2008, 2009
- German Runner-up (U18) 2001, 2003
- 2. Place Junior European Championships 2001
- 3. Place Women's World Championships
- 2. Place EHA Cup England Handball Association 2012
- 2. Place Super 7 League England Handball Association 2013
