= Lars Chr. Hægg =

Lars Chr. Hægg (8 August 1914 - 21 April 1998) was a Norwegian barrister.

He was born in Drammen, and took the cand.jur. degree in 1940. During World War II he participated in Norwegian resistance work, getting the Defence Medal 1940 – 1945. He got his lawyer's licence in 1945, and worked as a partner in a law firm to 1949. In 1949 he opened his own office, and from 1950 he had access to Supreme Court cases. He reverted to being a law firm partner in 1979.

Hægg was a member of the municipal councils of Oddernes and Kristiansand, where he lived. He chaired the regional branch of the Norwegian Bar Association from 1956 to 1958, and was the national president of Norges Huseierforbund from 1974 to 1976. In 1962 he became a board member of Landsforbundet for folkeavstemning, a lobby organization which worked to include the institution of referendums in the Norwegian Constitution. He has also been the chairman of Det Dramatiske Selskab i Christianssand and deputy chairman of Kristiansand Teater.
