= Johan Scharffenberg =

Norwegian activist (1869–1965)

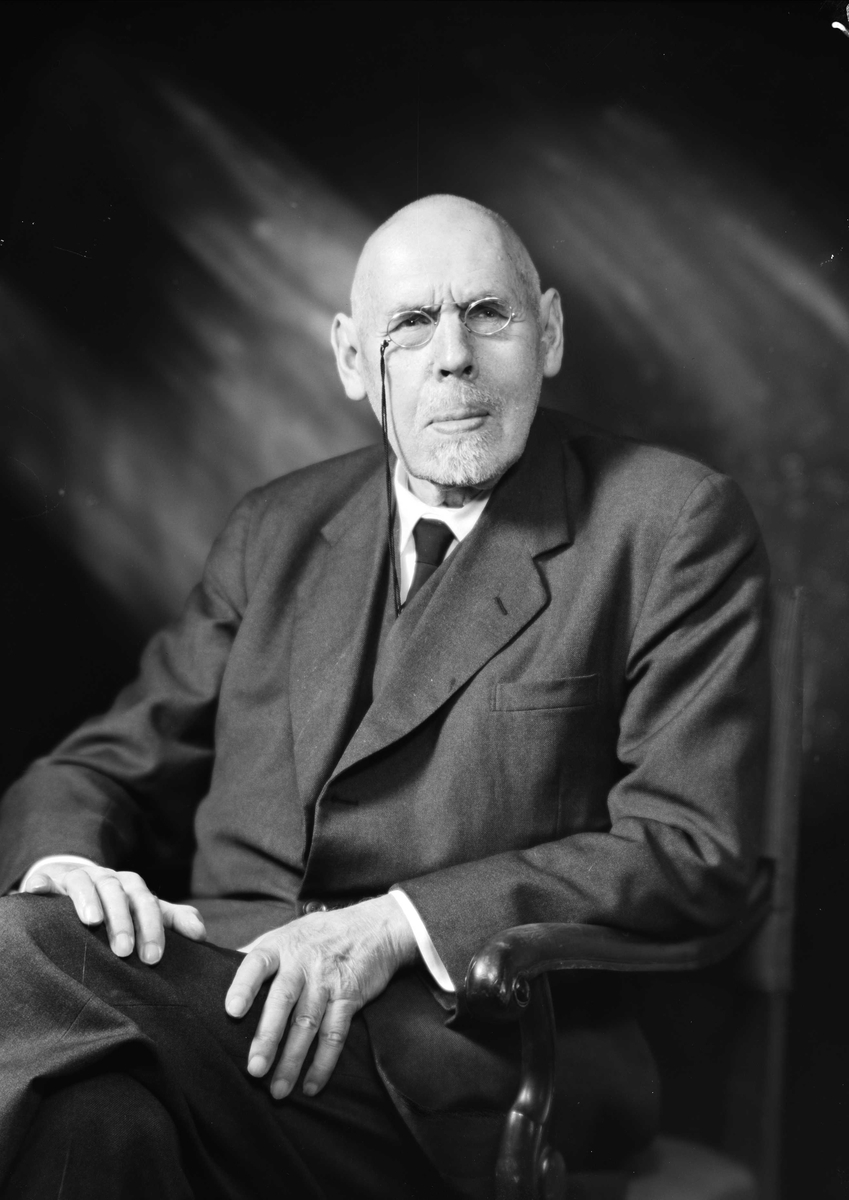
- Johan Scharffenberg in 1959
- Born: 23 November 1869; Moss, Norway
- Died: 1 February 1965 (aged 95)
- Occupations: psychiatrist, politician, speaker and writer

Johan Scharffenberg (23 November 1869 – 1 February 1965) was a Norwegian psychiatrist, politician, speaker and writer.

== Early life ==
Scharffenberg was born in Moss as the son of military officer Hedvard Carl Scharffenberg (1819–1893) and Caroline Fredrikke Dietrichson (1825–1876). He was a nephew of priest Johannes W. C. Dietrichson. The family soon moved from Moss, and Scharffenberg grew up in Kristiania, Hamar, and Molde. He finished his secondary education in 1888, enrolled in medicine studies in 1889 and took the cand.med. degree in 1897.

== Career ==
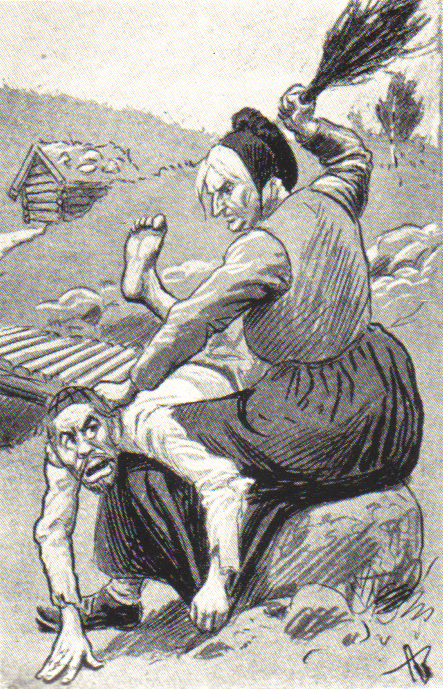
Caricature from 1905 by Andreas Bloch. Scharffenberg is birched by "Mother Aase"

Scharffenberg served as a physician and psychiatrist at psychiatric institutions and prisons, working in Trondhjem from 1903 to 1904 and then in Kristiania. He worked at the prison Botsfengselet from 1919 to 1940 and was a chief physician at Oslo Hospital from 1922 to late 1945, except for 1941 to early 1945. In 1976, a bust of him was raised at Oslo Hospital.

He was an active participant in the contemporary debates, starting in the late 1880s. He issued the poetry collection Hjemløse Sange ('Homeless Songs') as early as in 1889, under the pseudonym Kai Lykke. In 1899 he wrote the book Reform av den medicinske undervisning ('Reform of the Medical Training'), which became unpopular in academic circles at the time. After issuing the three-volume work Bidrag til de norske lægestillingers historie før 1800 ('Contributions to the History of Norwegian Medical Positions Before 1800) in 1904 and 1905, he applied for a fellowship at the Royal Frederick University in 1908. The Faculty of Medicine granted him the fellowship, but this was stopped by the Collegium Academicum (the university's board). Scharffenberg would later attract criticism by rejecting other methods, including that of Wilhelm Reich. He argued for less use of alcohol in the society, and was a member of the Alcohol Commission of 1910, which was established on his initiative.

Scharffenberg was also a supporter of the Nynorsk language, but was ambivalent to both nationalism and the dissolution of the union between Norway and Sweden in 1905.

=== Second World War ===
During the 1930s, Scharffenberg was highly critical of the emergence of Nazism in Germany. In a series of articles in Arbeiderbladet in 1933 he concluded that Adolf Hitler was a paranoid psychopath, and the German legation in Oslo delivered several official protests claiming he was offending a foreign head of state. After the ruling Nazi Party in Germany passed the German Sterilization Law in 1933, however, Scharffenberg—a supporter of eugenics—applauded the legislation and called for similar legislation in Norway. A lecture held at the Norwegian Students' Society in September 1940, where he called for freedom and resistance, gave him enormous applause, and is regarded as one of the starting events of the Norwegian resistance movement against the Nazi German occupation of Norway. He was also arrested after the talk and held in detention for a few weeks. After the war, Scharffenberg was selected to hold the welcome speech for King Haakon when he returned to Norway in June 1945. He participated in the public debate on the legal purge in Norway after World War II, arguing against the use of death penalty, and he warned against the occurrences where people took the law into their own hands and humiliated women who had had sexual relations with the occupants.

=== Post-war career ===
Scharffenberg was 76 years old in 1945, but still participated in the public debate. He opposed Norwegian membership in NATO and even the United Nations, arguing that the state was too small to gain influence. He was "in personal contact" with the people behind the NATO-critical, socialist newspaper Orientering. He admired the Swiss political system, and saw the country's neutrality as an ideal for Norway in the 1950 book Norske aktstykker til okkupasjonens forhistorie. He was also a proponent of the referendum, commonly deployed in Swiss politics. In 1961 he stood forward as a member of Landsforbundet for folkeavstemning, a lobby organization which worked to include the institution of referendums in the Norwegian Constitution. He died in February 1965 in Oslo.

== Selected works ==
- Hjemløse Sange (1889, poetry)
- Norske aktstykker til okkupasjonens forhistorie (1950)
