= Maria Kourdoulos =

British and Portuguese team handball player (born 1993)

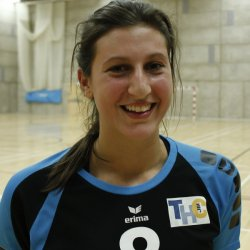

Personal information
- Nationality: Portuguese/British
- Born: 18 April 1993 (age 33) London, England
- Height: 1.67 m (5 ft 6 in)

Sport
- Sport: Handball
- Position: Left Wing
- Current club: Club Sports Da Madeira
- Number: 8

Youth career
- Years: Team
- 2001–2010: Club Sports Da Madeira

Senior clubs
- Years: Team
- 2010–2011: Club Sports de Madeira
- 2011–2016: Thames Handball Club
- 2017: Club Sports de Madeira
National team
Years	Team	Apps	(Gls)
2016-	Great Britain	2	(2)

Maria Manuela Abreu Kourdoulos (born 18 April 1993 in London) is a dual National British and Portuguese team handball player.

She played for the club Thames Handball Club. Her status as a dual national allowed her to trial for the handball team of Great Britain, where she missed the selection stage for the London Olympic Games 2012 only by a few months. Immediately after her signing in 2010, she dominated on the left wing attack side. During 2011/12, her second season at the London club, she was crowned Top goal scorer with 48 goals and her goal tally helped the club to win the London Cup 2011. In the same year she won the Jack Petchey Award for her achievements. She was mentioned as a key player in 2013, when the club played in London against a select team of Hungarian handball players and won. She participated in the 2014/15 Women's EHF Challenge Cup Round 3 where she was listed among the top 5 goal scorers of the round. In March 2016, it was announced that she had been selected for the GB Women's handball squad for UK-based players. She returned to Madeira, Portugal for the 2016/2017 season and played again at the EHF Challenge Cup.
