= Bredahl =

Bredahl is a surname. Notable people with this surname include:

- Andreas Bredahl (born 2003), Danish footballer
- Charlotte Bredahl (born 1957), American equestrian
- Jimmi Bredahl (born 1967), Danish boxer
- Jacob Bredahl of Hatesphere
- Johnny Bredahl (born 1968), Danish boxer
- Thomas Bredahl (born 1980), Danish guitarist
- Ole Bredahl of Sir Henry and his Butlers

== See also ==
- Brodahl
- Brodal
- Bredal
