= Longum, Agder =

Village in Arendal Municipality, Norway

Longum
- Village
- Interactive map of Longum
- Coordinates: 58.5088°N 08.7772°E
- Country: Norway
- Region: Southern Norway
- County: Agder
- District: Østre Agder
- Municipality: Arendal Municipality
- Elevation: 51 m (167 ft)
- Time zone: UTC+01:00 (CET)
  - Summer (DST): UTC+02:00 (CEST)
- Post Code: 4849 Arendal

Longum is a village in Arendal Municipality in Agder County, Norway. It is located along the European route E18 highway, approximately halfway between the village of Brekka, about 4 kilometres (2.5 mi) to the north, and the town of Arendal, about 5 kilometres (3.1 mi) to the south.
