= Charlotte Morkken =

Norwegian handball player (born 1992)

Personal information
- Nationality: Norwegian
- Born: 16 May 1992 (age 34) Bergen, Norway
- Height: 1.72 m (5 ft 8 in)

Sport
- Sport: Handball
- Position: Right Back
- Current club: Thames Handball Club
- Number: 3

Youth career
- Years: Team
- 1998–2008: IL Arstad

Senior clubs
- Years: Team
- 2008–2011: IL Arstad

Charlotte Morkken (born 16 May 1992), is a Norwegian team handball player. She played for the club Thames Handball Club. She was mentioned as a key player in 2013, when the club played in London against a top team of Hungarian handball players and won. She participated in the 2014/15 Women's EHF Challenge Cup Round 3 where she was listed among the top 50 goal scorers of the round.
