= Sven Arntzen =

Norwegian barrister (1897–1976)

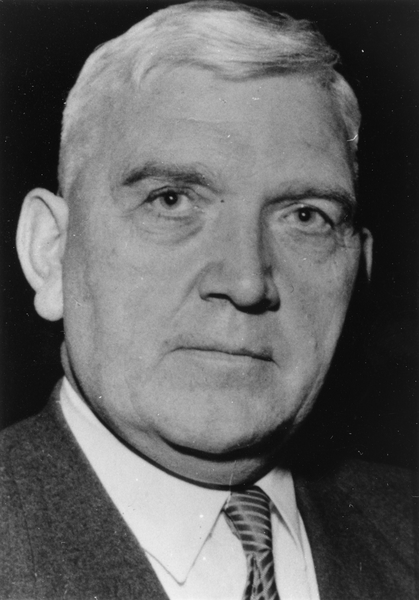
Sven Arntzen, 1965

Sven Arntzen (4 April 1897 – 27 November 1976) was a Norwegian barrister. He was also the acting director general of the Norwegian Prosecuting Authority from 1945 to 1946, and played an important role in the legal purge in Norway after World War II.

== Pre-war life ==
He was born in Kristiania as the son of banker Per Arntzen (1864–1924) and his wife Aasta Høst (1869–1945), and was the brother of Ole Arntzen. He was a distant descendant of Andreas Arntzen. He took the cand.jur. degree with excellent grades in 1920, and then worked as a deputy judge. From 1922 to 1924 he studied in France. He then settled in Kristiania/Oslo as a lawyer, and gained access to Supreme Court cases in 1927. He also worked with law candidates at the University of Oslo, and was a prominent member of the Norwegian Bar Association.

== World War II ==
In 1940 Norway was invaded and occupied by Nazi Germany. Arntzen worked to spread resistance to the occupation throughout his profession. In 1942 he was recruited by Haakon Sund as a police organizer within the Norwegian resistance movement. Arntzen became a member of Milorg's military council and Hjemmefrontens Ledelse. From May 1944 to September 1944 he was incarcerated at Bredtveit prison. The authorities not being aware of his association with Milorg and Hjemmefrontens Ledelse, he was then released from prison, only to continue his resistance work. He helped plan the situation which would follow the German defeat in World War II.

== Post-war life ==
When the war ended on 8 May 1945, Arntzen immediately became the acting national chief of police. One week later he became acting Director of Public Prosecutions. As such he played an important role in the legal purge in Norway after World War II. He withdrew in October 1946, and returned to his barrister's office, where he spent the rest of his career. He also represented the state of Norway in various arbitrations in the International Court of Justice. During a police raid in November 1948 it was revealed that the already-imprisoned Nazi agents, Gard Holtskog, Sten Blom Westberg and Hans Johann Krijom, had fabricated documents which tied Arntzen to the Nazis.

Arntzen chaired the Norwegian Bar Association from 1959 to 1961, as well as Storebrand and Norsk Jernverk. He received the King's Medal for Courage, the Norwegian Defence Medal and was decorated as a Commander with Star of the Royal Norwegian Order of St. Olav. In 1961 he stood forward as a member of Landsforbundet for folkeavstemning, a lobby organization which worked to include the institution of referendums in the Norwegian Constitution.

In 1922 he married Ellinor Bergfeldt (1897–1983). Their son, barrister Andreas Arntzen, worked in Arntzen's barrister office which became known as Arntzen de Besche. Through him, Sven Arntzen was also the paternal grandfather of judge Wenche Elizabeth Arntzen. He died on 27 November 1976 at the age of 79 of heart failure in Aix-en-Provence, and was buried at Vestre gravlund.

Legal offices
| Preceded by Jørgen Nordvik | Norwegian Director of Public Prosecutions (acting); 1945–1946 | Succeeded by Andreas Aulie |
