= Tore Gjelsvik =

Norwegian geologist and polar explorer

- Born: 7 September 1916; Bodø, Norway
- Died: 23 January 2006 (aged 89); Bærum, Norway
- Occupation: Geologist

Tore Gjelsvik (7 September 1916 – 23 January 2006) was a Norwegian geologist and polar explorer. He headed the Norwegian Polar Institute from 1960 to 1983, and played an important role in the Norwegian resistance during World War II.

== Personal life ==
Gjelsvik was born in Bodin Municipality to Eystein Gjelsvik and Lina Relling. He finished his examen artium at Oslo Cathedral School in 1936, and thereafter started studying at the University of Oslo. He graduated in 1942. He married Anne Marie Skaven in 1945.

== World War II ==
Being a student in Oslo at the outbreak of World War II, Gjelsvik participated in the resistance movement from 1940. By that time he had already participated in the Norwegian Campaign. He was among the editors and producers of the magazine Bulletinen, one of the first underground newspapers, and this consumed much of his time. He was among the initiators of the first intelligence groups, and had contacts with the leaders of XU. Gjelsvik became a member of the Coordination Committee (Norwegian: Koordinasjonskomiteen (KK)) in 1943, a central coordinating organ for the civil branch of the resistance.

According to one historian, students of natural sciences were well-suited for intelligence work, as they were practically oriented and used to working in the field. Leading members of XU, such as Astrid Løken, were natural scientists at the University of Oslo.

He has documented the Norwegian resistance in his book from 1977, Hjemmefronten. Den sivile motstand under okkupasjonen 1940–45, based on personal knowledge and experience.

== Postwar career ==
Gjelsvik took the dr. philos. degree in 1953 on the thesis Metamorphosed Dolerites in the Gneiss Area of Sunnmøre on the West Coast of Southern Norway. He worked as a geologist from 1952 to 1959, and also worked for the United Nations. In 1960 he was appointed manager for the Norwegian Polar Institute, a position he held until his retirement in 1983. He participated in Polar research, as a member of several committees, such as Det interdepartementale Polarutvalg and Polarrådet. He chaired the geographical society Det norske geografiske selskap from 1963 to 1965, and the geological society Norsk Geologisk Forening from 1963 to 1964. He took part in the developing Norway's Resistance Museum, chairing its advisory board from 1964 to 1973, and was a member of the Fram committee from 1960 to 1997.

Gjelsvik was decorated Knight, First Class of the Royal Norwegian Order of St. Olav in 1975, and Commander in 1984. He was also a Commander of the Order of the Polar Star, was an honorary member of the Norwegian Geographical Society, Norsk Polarklubb and the Scientific Committee on Antarctic Research, and was a member of the Norwegian Academy of Science and Letters from 1974. He lived at Gjettum in his later life, and died in Bærum in 2006.

== Selected bibliography ==
- Hjemmefronten. Den sivile motstand under okkupasjonen 1940–45 (1977)
- Snart kommer vår dag. Erindringer fra krigen (1999)
