= Landsforbundet for folkeavstemning =

Norwegian lobby organization

Landsforbundet for folkeavstemning ('The National Association for Referendum') was a Norwegian lobby organization.

== History ==
=== Inception ===
It was founded in April 1961 with the goal of including the institution of referendums in the Norwegian Constitution. The context was the Norwegian "one-party state", which lasted from 1945 to September 1961, and was marked by the continuous majority held by the Norwegian Labour Party in the Norwegian Parliament. The Labour Party did win their majority through a series of free elections, but the opposition wanted to introduce referendums to balance Parliament. In several debates the centre-right opposition (Liberal, Christian Democratic, Centre, Conservative) was unanimous in their demand of constitutionalized referendums.

The association had a predecessor in a study circle organized by the Norwegian Shipowners' Association. It was launched with an appeal from eight notable citizens: barrister Sven Arntzen, Chief Justice Paal Berg, director Gunnar Jahn, professor of medicine Jan Birger Jansen, national archivist Reidar Omang, lawyer Astri Rynning, chief physician Johan Scharffenberg and barrister Sigrid Stray. The chairman of the association's board was Ivar Kaldager, and secretary general was Th. Hasle. People associated with the Labour Party were asked to join, but declined.

The first national convention was held in October 1962. Acting chairman Ivar Kaldager was formally elected. Deputy chair was Paal Berg, and board members were Astri Rynning, editor-in-chief Kjell Bøe, civil servant Trygve Eckhoff, editor-in-chief Dagfinn Flem, engineer Steinar Grundt, barrister Lars Chr. Hægg and lawyer Reidar Selmer.

Notable writings which outlined some the association's ideas were Dagfinn Flem's 1945 book Det sveitsiske demokrati about Swiss democracy, as well as Johan Scharffenberg's 1945 book Qui vadis Norvegia? in which he proposed constitutional reform. In the early 1960s Scharffenberg was working on a book named Velgerne som statsmakt, which was to capture his ideas on referendums.

=== Later work ===
The association soon ran into problems. Political scientist Tor Bjørklund has made note of the narrow demographic stratum associated with the association. This soon became evident, as the question of Norwegian membership in the European Economic Community became a hot issue in the autumn of 1961. People in higher social strata, including the ruling Labour Party, tended to support this membership, whereas opponents were people associated with the Socialist People's Party, the Communist Party and the Norwegian Farmers and Smallholders Union. To complicate matters, these fringe organizations proposed that a referendum on the possible Norwegian membership be held. In this situation, Ivar Kaldager soon became vague about the association's views on referendums. It was said that integrating referendums in the Constitution was a more pressing issue than actually holding one.

As it turned out, Norwegian politicians became in favor for both membership and a referendum during 1962. However, French President Charles de Gaulle vetoed Norway's membership, instantly killing the initiative. The same thing happened in 1967. As de Gaulle stepped down, a third debate arose in the early 1970s, but the initiative fell after 53.5% voted against it in the 1972 Norwegian European Communities membership referendum.

In 1984 Landsforbundet for folkeavstemning crafted a law proposal that was forwarded by Odd Einar Dørum, Oddleif Fagerheim, Hans Olav Tungesvik and Ola O. Røssum. The proposal was about the right of a minority in Parliament to call a referendum on cases ratified by a parliamentary majority. The proposal received 15 votes, and thus fell. Landsforbundet for folkeavstemning later faded out, and no longer exists.
