= Olaf Solumsmoen =

Norwegian newspaper editor and politician

Olaf Solumsmoen (19 July 1896 – 22 September 1972) was a Norwegian newspaper editor and politician for the Labour Party.

He was born in Sigdal, and decided to be a stenographer. He was hired in the Labour Party newspaper Fremtiden in Drammen, where he also was involved in local politics. He eventually left stenography to become a journalist. He worked as chief editor for the Labour Party press office Arbeidernes Pressekontor from 1931 to 1946. During the Nazi occupation of Norway from 1940 to 1945, an underground newspaper was published titled Bulletinen. The first editors were Olaf Solumsmoen and Olav Larssen . Both men were arrested and imprisoned. Solumsmoen was imprisoned at Grini concentration camp (Norwegian: Grini fangeleir) from 27 January 1942 to the end of the war, 8 May 1945.

From 1946 Solumsmoen worked as "night editor" of Arbeiderbladet, the primary Labour Party newspaper. In 1948 he was hired as press secretary (title changed to state secretary in 1956) to the Prime Minister during Einar Gerhardsen's second cabinet until 1951, Oscar Torp's cabinet 1951–1955, third 1955-1963 and fourth cabinet Gerhardsen 1963–1965.

The tenure was only interrupted by the cabinet Lyng administration, which reigned for a month in 1963. He died in 1972 in Oslo.

== Other sources ==
- Giertsen, Børre R. (1946) Norsk fangeleksikon. Grinifangene (Oslo: J.W. Cappelens Forlag)
- Ottosen, Kristian (2004) Nordmenn i fangenskap 1940–1945 (Oslo: Universitetsforlaget) ISBN 82-15-00288-9.
