= Haakon Sund =

Norwegian judge and prosecutor

Haakon Ragnvald Olsen Sund
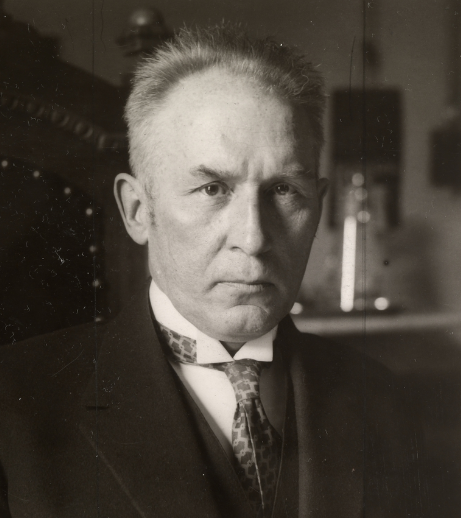
- Sund in 1935
- Born: 5 April 1873
- Died: 31 December 1965 (aged 92)
- Citizenship: Norwegian
- Education: the cand.jur. degree
- Occupations: police chief, judge and prosecutor

Haakon Ragnvald Olsen Sund (5 April 1873 – 31 December 1965) was a Norwegian judge and prosecutor.

He took the cand.jur. degree in 1895, and became police chief in Bodø in 1904. In 1913 he was promoted to Public Prosecutor (Norwegian: statsadvokat) in Nordland. He then advanced further, to district stipendiary magistrate in Midhordland District Court in 1919, presiding judge in Frostating and Gulating Court of Appeal in 1926, and in 1929 he was appointed as the Norwegian Director of Public Prosecutions.

During the occupation of Norway by Nazi Germany, Sund was fired for anti-German sentiments. He was replaced by Jørgen Nordvik in February 1941. On 12 April, three days after the German invasion, Sund had signed radio broadcast announcements which quoted the Hague Conventions on the laws of war, together with police chief of Oslo Kristian Welhaven and mayor of Oslo Trygve Nilsen. The same announcements warned that francs-tireurs taking part in irregular fighting would be punishable by death in a court-martial. The concern of Welhaven and the other dignitaries was that Norwegians would not know the regulations of the Hague Conventions nor understand the concept of being francs-tireurs, and be then court martialled by the Germans

Sund did not return to office after the war. Sund died in December 1965, and was buried at Vestre gravlund.

Legal offices
| Preceded by Peder Kjerschow | Norwegian Director of Public Prosecutions; 1929–1940 | Succeeded by Jørgen Nordvik (Nazi collaborator) |
