= Caroline Brodahl =

Norwegian team handball player (born 1992)

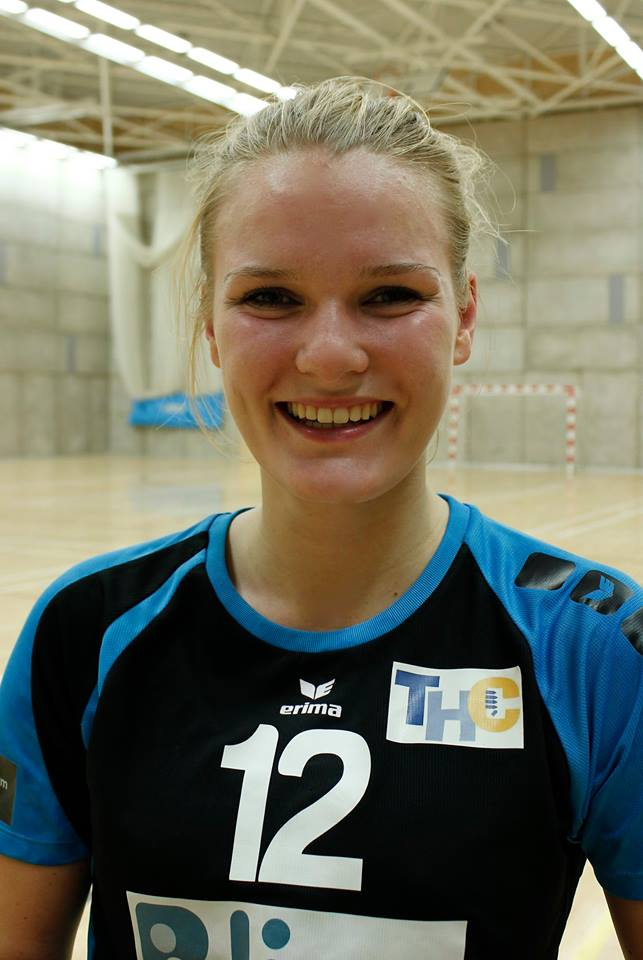

Personal information
- Nationality: Norwegian
- Born: 21 August 1992 (age 34) Bergen, Norway
- Height: 1.72 m (5 ft 8 in)

Sport
- Sport: Handball
- Position: Pivot
- Current club: Thames Handball Club
- Number: 12

Youth career
- Years: Team
- 1996–2009: IL Bjarg

Senior clubs
- Years: Team
- 2009–2011: IL Bjarg

Caroline Brodahl (born in 1992), is a Norwegian team handball player. She played for Chelsea Handball Club (2021-23) for the club Thames Handball Club (2012-16). She was mentioned as a key player in 2013, when the club played in London against a top team of Hungarian handball players and won. In December 2013 she won the Jack Petchey Award for her sporting achievements. In 2014/15 she participated in the Women's EHF Challenge Cup Round 3 where she scored goals in both, home and away matches. Where highly unusually identical goal scores were recorded on both playing dates.
