= Olav Larssen =

Norwegian newspaper editor and politician

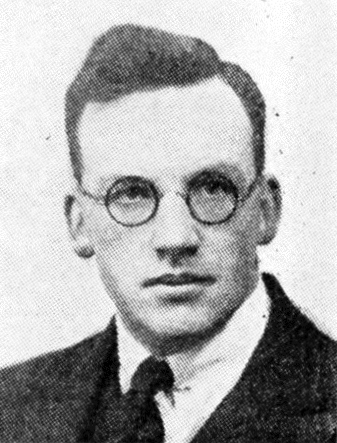
Olav Larssen

Olav Larssen (10 July 1894 – 5 July 1981) was a Norwegian newspaper editor and politician for the Labour and Communist parties.

== Personal life ==
Olav Larssen was born in Furnes as a son of baker Kristian Larssen and Lovise Wahlum (1873–1923). He attended primary school in rural Furnes, but then moved to the nearby city Hamar to take apprenticeship as a typographer. By 1910 he dwelled as a tenant in Østregate 55 in the neighborhood Østbyen, nearby Hamar Station. He recalled having to adapt to the city culture, and shed some of his childhood dialect/sociolect.

In 1917 he married taylor's daughter Aslaug Rustad (1892–1987). She hailed from Hamar and was the oldest girl of ten siblings. After her mother's death when she was fourteen, she had to abandon plans to become a hairdresser to help her father with tending to their family.

Their daughter Randi (1924–2002) was a well-known journalist and writer. From April 1946 she was married to Prime Minister of Norway (1971–72 and 1973–76) Trygve Bratteli. Their son Erik (1921–) became a state secretary and also a permanent under-secretary of state (Norwegian: departementsråd) in the Ministry of Transport. He changed his last name to Ribu, and was married to a daughter of editor Jørgen Hustad.

== Career ==
=== Hamar and Drammen ===
Olav Larssen was involved in the temperance movement at a young age. He had a family background of interest in politics, as his father was a member of Furnes municipal council for the Liberal Party. Later, in 1915, the liberal workers' union Furnes Arbeiderforening under the chairmanship of Kristian Larssen decided to take up collective membership in the Labour Party. Olav Larssen became active in the youth wing of the Labour Party, Norges Socialdemokratiske Ungdomsforbund (NSU), already in 1911 when a local NSU branch was founded in Hamar.

At that time, Larssen underwent the typographer's apprenticeship in the book printer A. Sæthers Bogtrykkeri. He had nearly completed his training when being hired as sub-editor in the Labour Party newspaper Demokraten in June 1913. (Note: Note that Egil Helle gives the date wrongly; 1 June 1913. Larssen was hired in mid-June.) Hitherto, his experience with journalism had been limited to writing pieces in the youth wing's national newspaper Klassekampen from time to time, a task associated with his active political role. However, he had also involved himself in a debate on the editor of Demokraten, which incidentally was printed by A. Sæther.

Larssen had recently become secretary in the board of the newly established county branch of NSU. He was later chosen as one of the secretaries at the NSU national convention in Hamar in 1914.

On the tenure in Demokraten, Larsen wrote that "they were not relieved from the eternal financial torment". He resigned from the newspaper in 1916. Newly engaged to Aslaug Rustad, Larssen was hired in the Drammen-based newspaper Fremtiden in October 1916. After some introductory weeks, he was hired as manager of the newspaper's local office in Kongsberg. He returned to the Fremtiden head office in Drammen in the autumn of 1918. He bought a city house in Strømsø together with colleague Olaf Solumsmoen.

=== Editor-in-chief ===
He edited the Labour Party newspapers Demokraten from 1920 to 1927, and Hamar Arbeiderblad from 1927 to 1935. In 1935 he was hired as a journalist in Arbeiderbladet. In 1940, when Norway became invaded and occupied by Germany, Larssen was the acting news editor of Arbeiderbladet before it was stopped by the Germans. He co-edited the illegal Bulletinen from 1940 to 1942, but for this he was imprisoned. He was held at Møllergata 19 from January to April 1942, then at Grini until February 1943, and thereafter in the Sachsenhausen concentration camp until the war ended. From this period he wrote the section "Blant landsmenn i Sachsenhausen" ('Among fellow countrymen in Sachsenhausen') in the memoir book 3 fra Sachsenhausen (together with August Lange, Carl Johan Frederik Jakhelln and W. Winiarski).

Following the liberation of Norway in 1945, Larssen again became the news editor of Arbeiderbladet. He was editor-in-chief from 1949 to 1963.

Media offices
Preceded by Torolv Kandahl	Chairman of the Norwegian Press Association; 1946–1947	Succeeded by Rolv Werner Erichsen
Preceded by Martin Tranmæl	Chief editor of Arbeiderbladet; 1949–1963	Succeeded by Reidar Hirsti
