= Erik Bredal =

Erik (Erich) Bredal may refer to:

- Erik Bredal (bishop) (1608–1672), Norwegian bishop
- Erik Bredal (governor) (1683–c. 1741), governor of the Danish West Indies
