= Austre Moland Church =

Church in Agder, Norway

- Austre Moland kirke
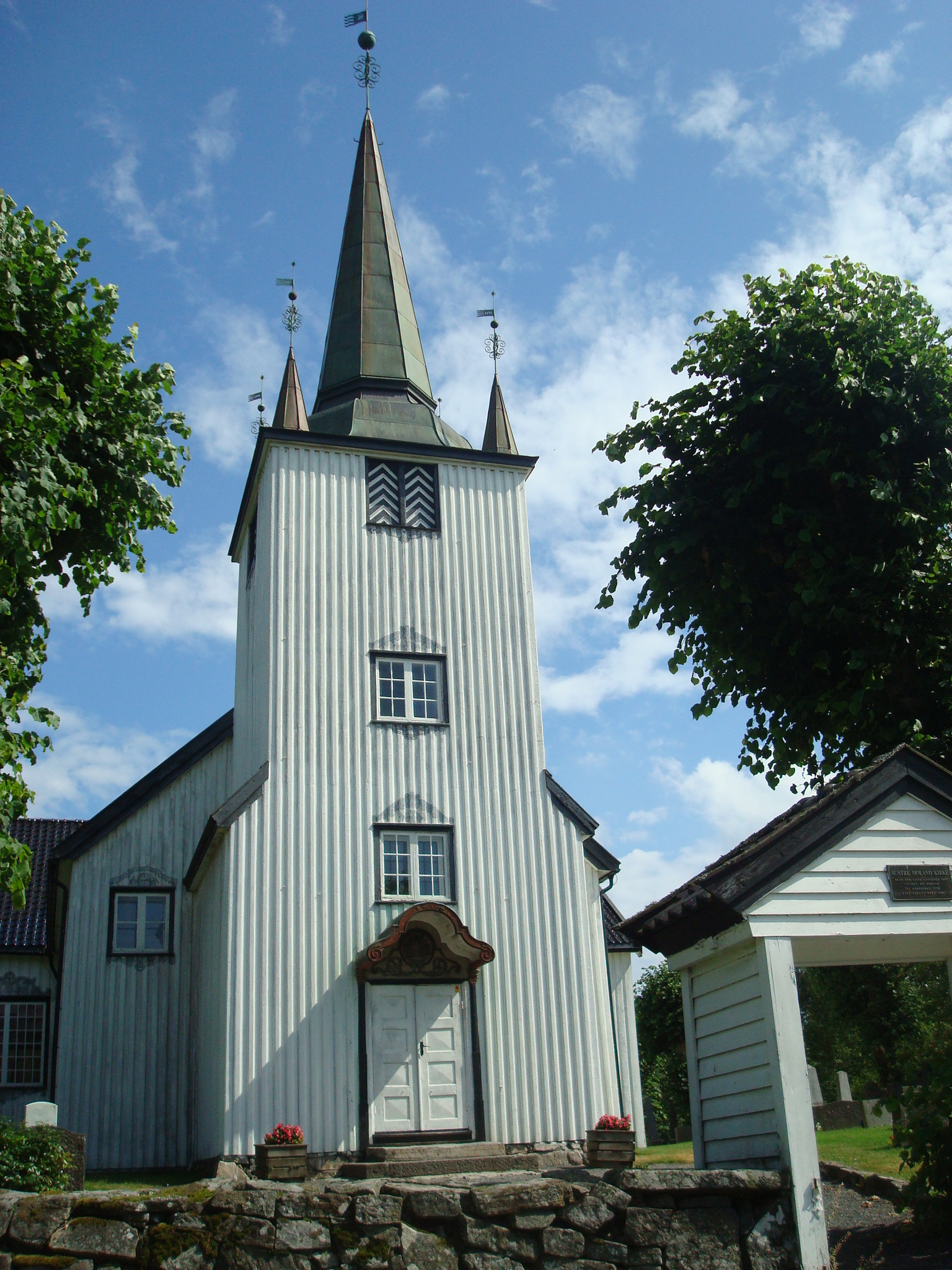
- View of the church
- Austre Moland Church
- 58°32′47″N 08°48′40″E
- Location: Arendal Municipality, Agder
- Country: Norway
- Denomination: Church of Norway
- Previous denomination: Catholic Church
- Churchmanship: Evangelical Lutheran

History
- Former name: Østre Moland kirke
- Status: Parish church
- Founded: 13th century
- Consecrated: 1673

Architecture
- Functional status: Active
- Architect: Ole Ormsen
- Architectural type: Cruciform
- Completed: 1673 (353 years ago)

Specifications
- Capacity: 496
- Materials: Wood

Administration
- Diocese: Agder og Telemark
- Deanery: Arendal prosti
- Parish: Moland
- Norwegian Cultural Heritage Site
- Type: Church
- Status: Automatically protected
- ID: 83828

Austre Moland Church (Norwegian: Austre Moland kirke) is a parish church of the Church of Norway in Arendal Municipality in Agder county, Norway. It is located in the Brekka, along the lake Molandsvann. It is one of the churches for the Moland parish which is part of the Arendal prosti (deanery) in the Diocese of Agder og Telemark. The white, wooden church was built in a cruciform design in 1673 using plans drawn up by the architect Ole Ormsen. The church seats about 496 people.

The church was called Østre Moland kirke until 1919 when it was renamed Austre Moland kirke after some Norwegian spelling reforms.

== History ==
The earliest existing historical records of the church date back to the year 1450, but the church was likely founded in the 13th century. The first church here was a stave church. The church had its own priest until around the year 1400 when it became a chapel of ease for the Holt Church parish. In 1633, the old stave church was torn down and replaced with a new church building on the same site.

In 1673, the church was torn down again and replaced with a new long church design. In 1750, a new tower was built on the church under the direction of Ole Nilsen Weierholt. The church bells date from 1750 and 1754, so they were added after the new tower was completed. In 1779, the church underwent a large renovation and expansion. A new choir was built on the east end of the old building and two new wings were built on either side of the church (to the north and south) to create a new cruciform design. The builder Beint Gundersen Skjævestad led this renovation.

In 1797, the interior of the church was painted for the first time. The painting and other decoration of the church was carried out by Anders Grundesøn Løwe from Risør at a cost of 300 riksdaler, and his fellow artist Nils Christensen created all of the portraits of the angels and apostles.

The building underwent a major restoration in 1961.

== Media gallery ==
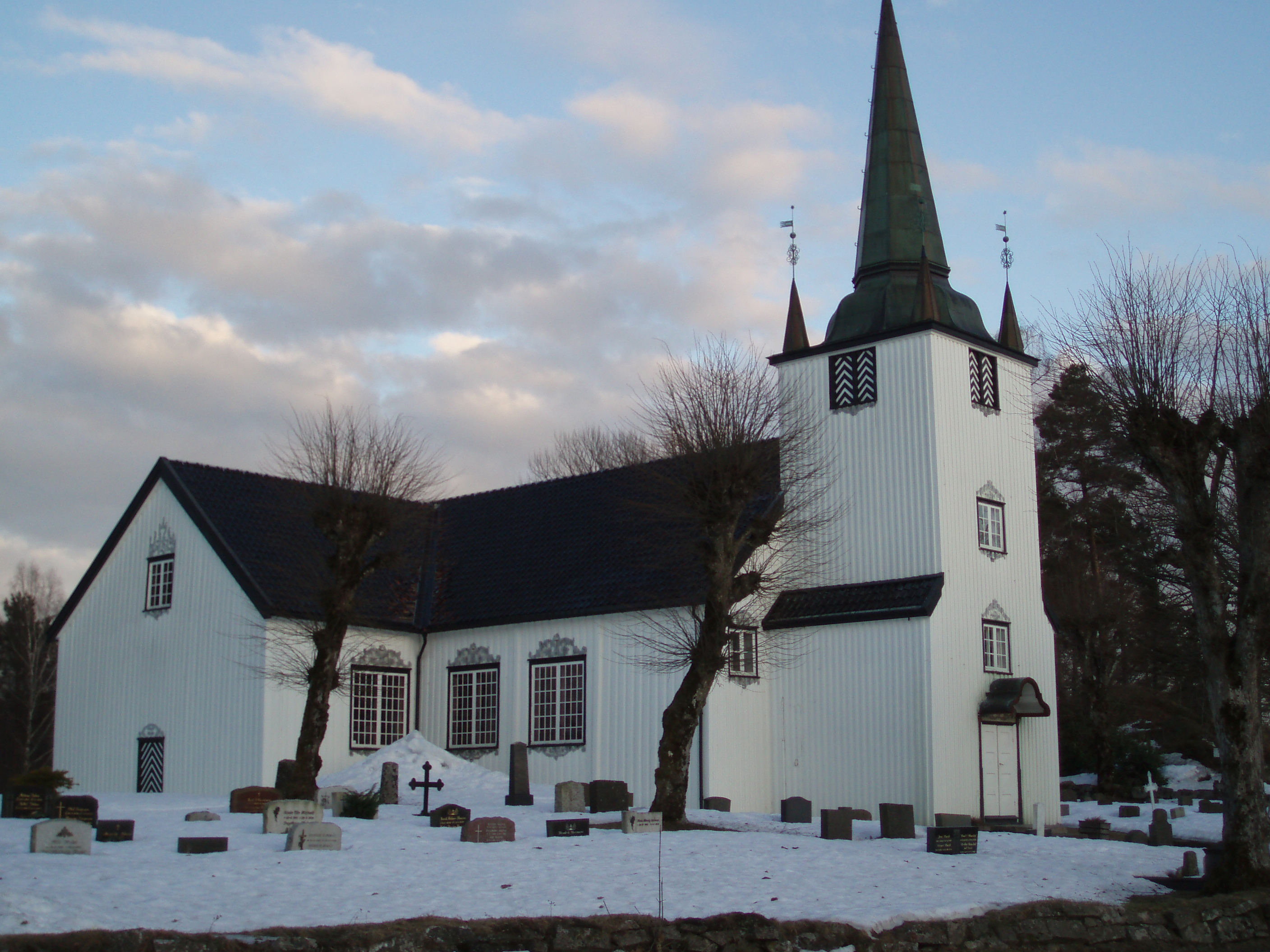

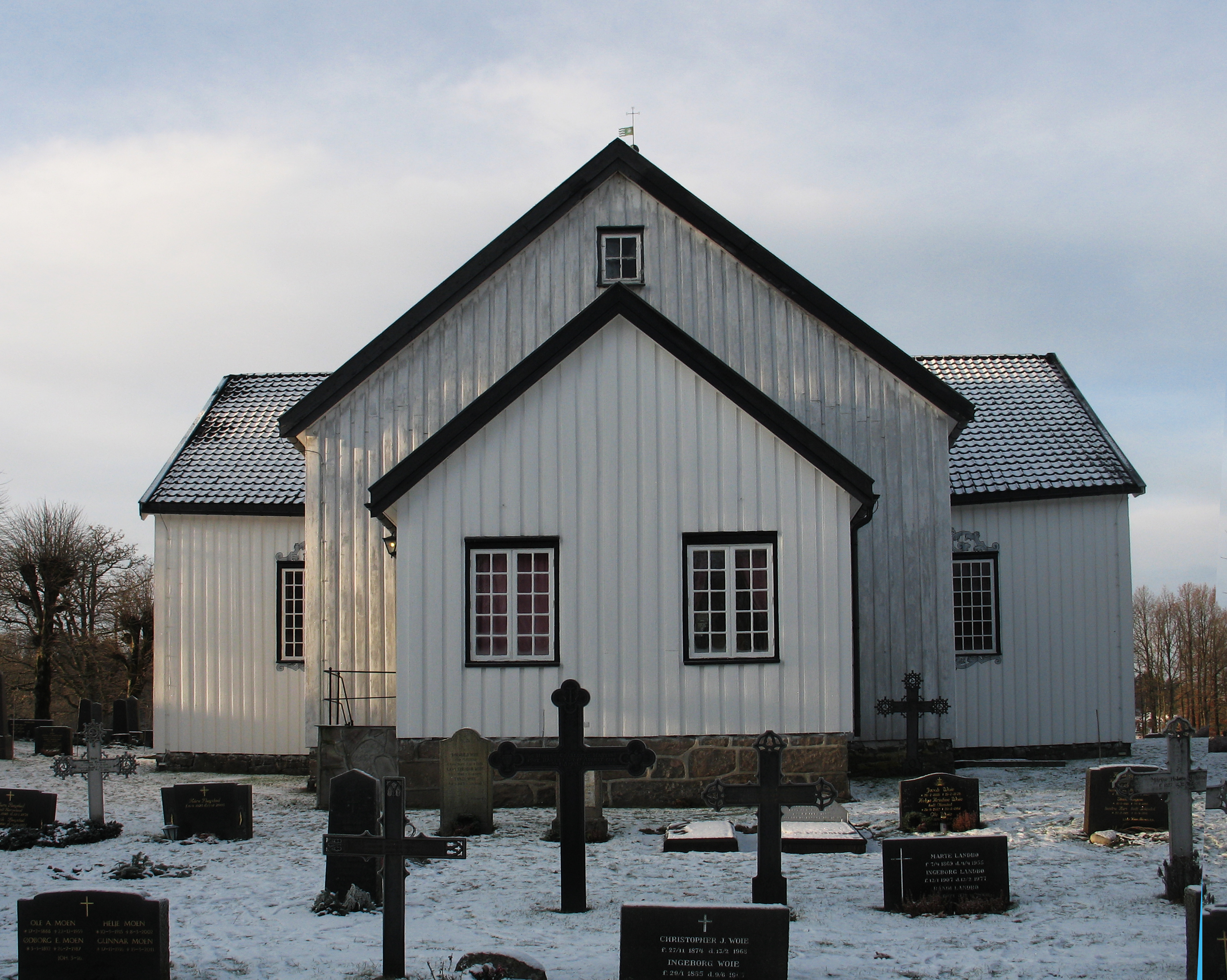

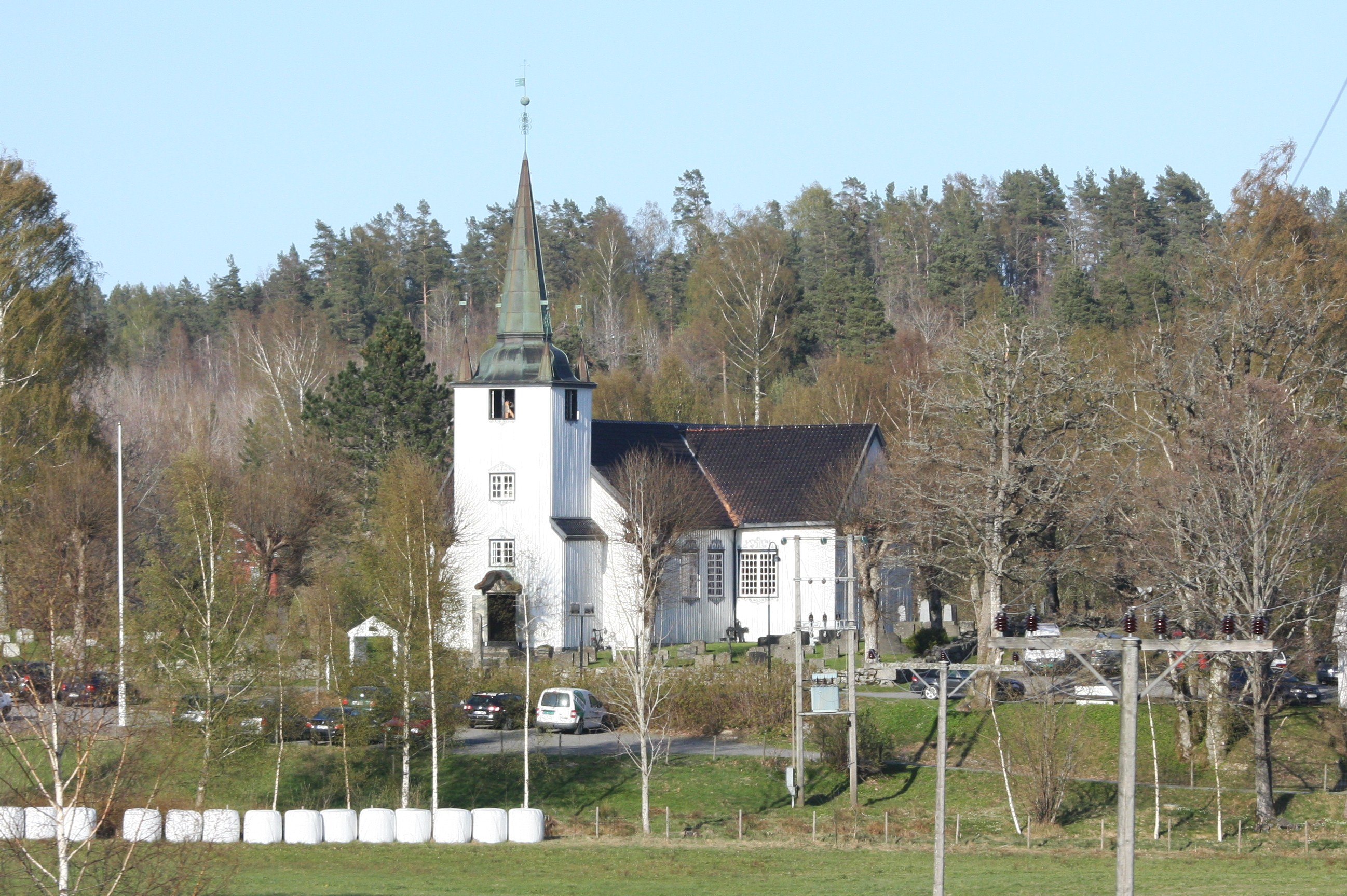

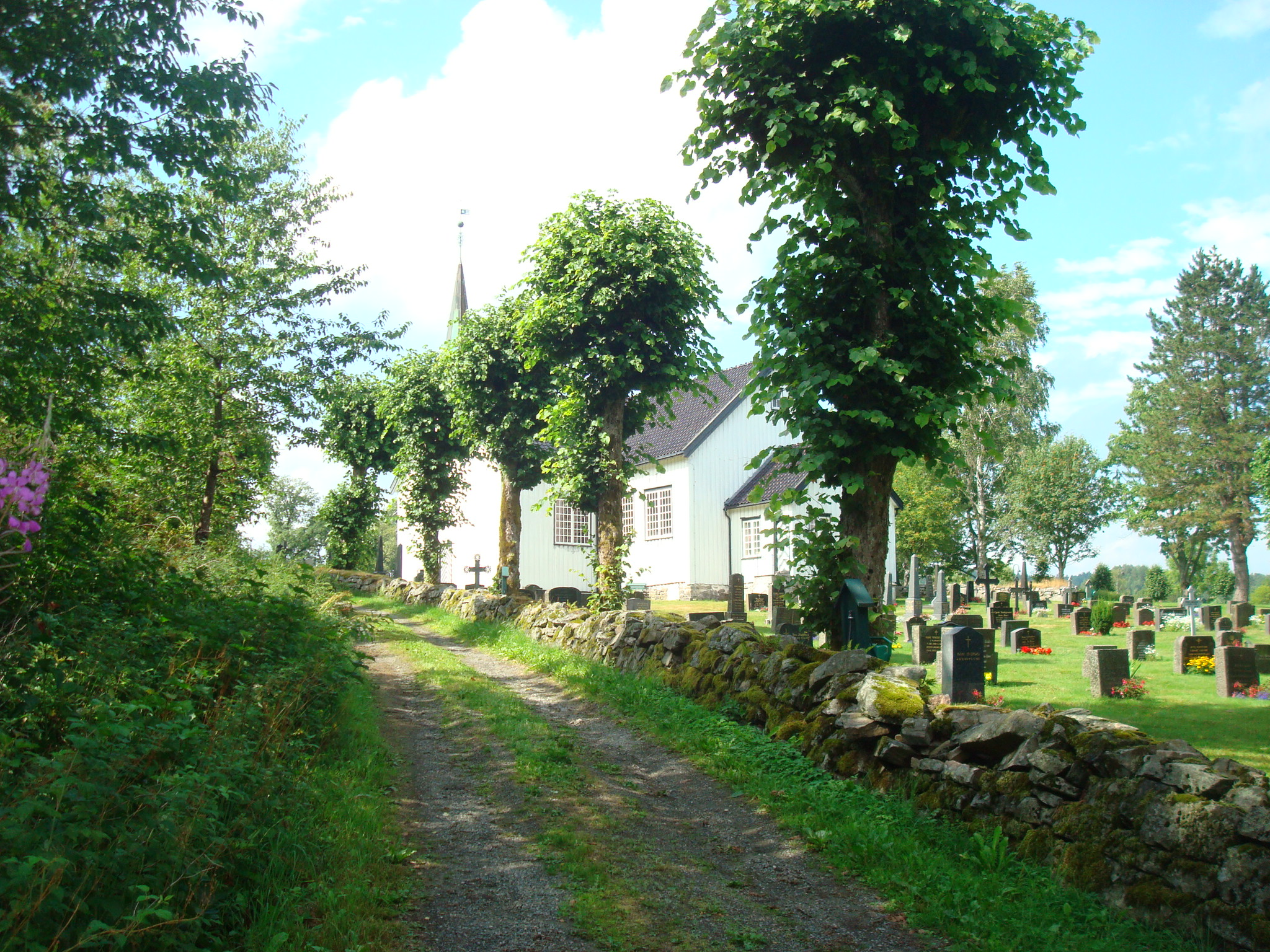

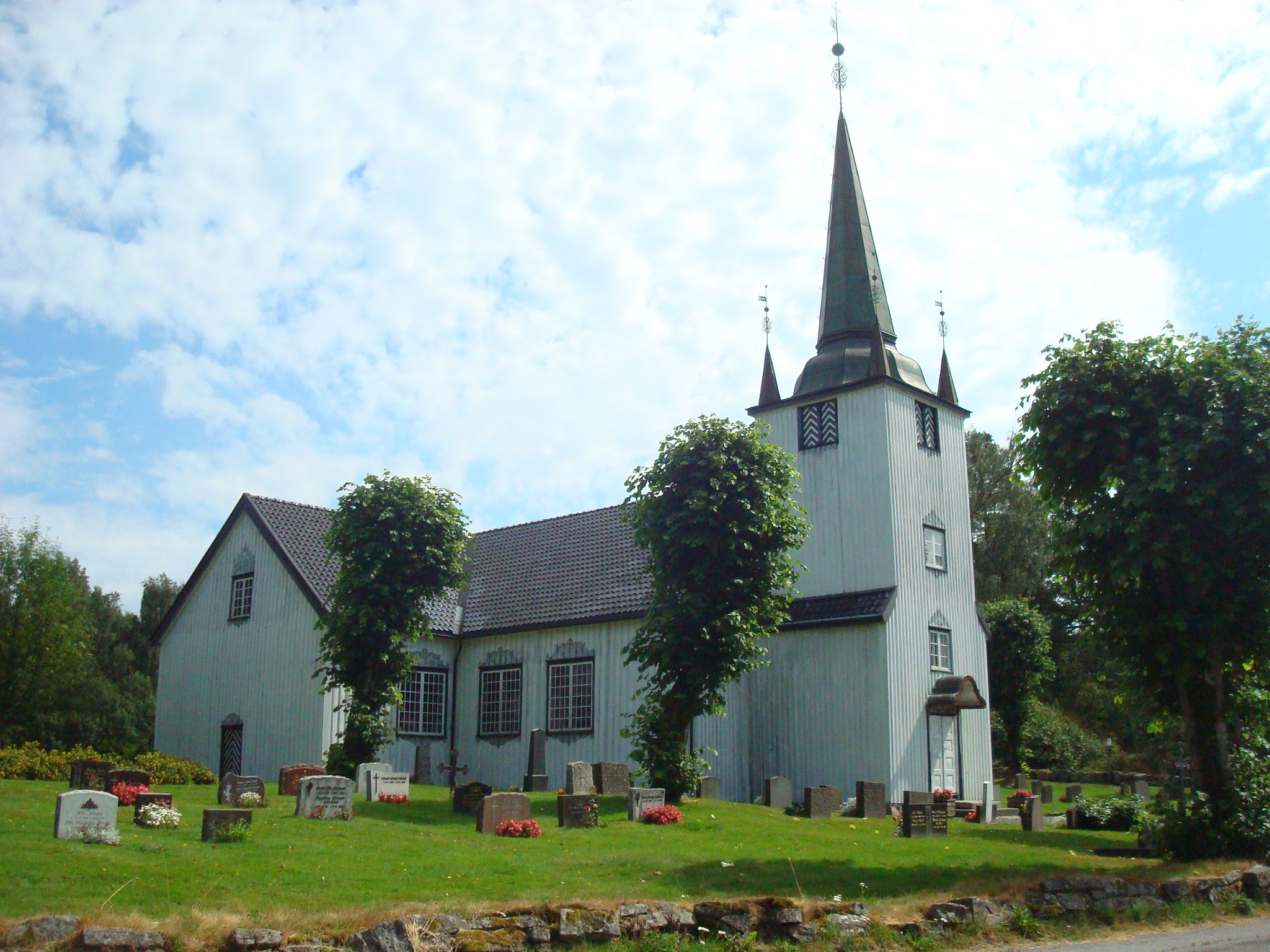

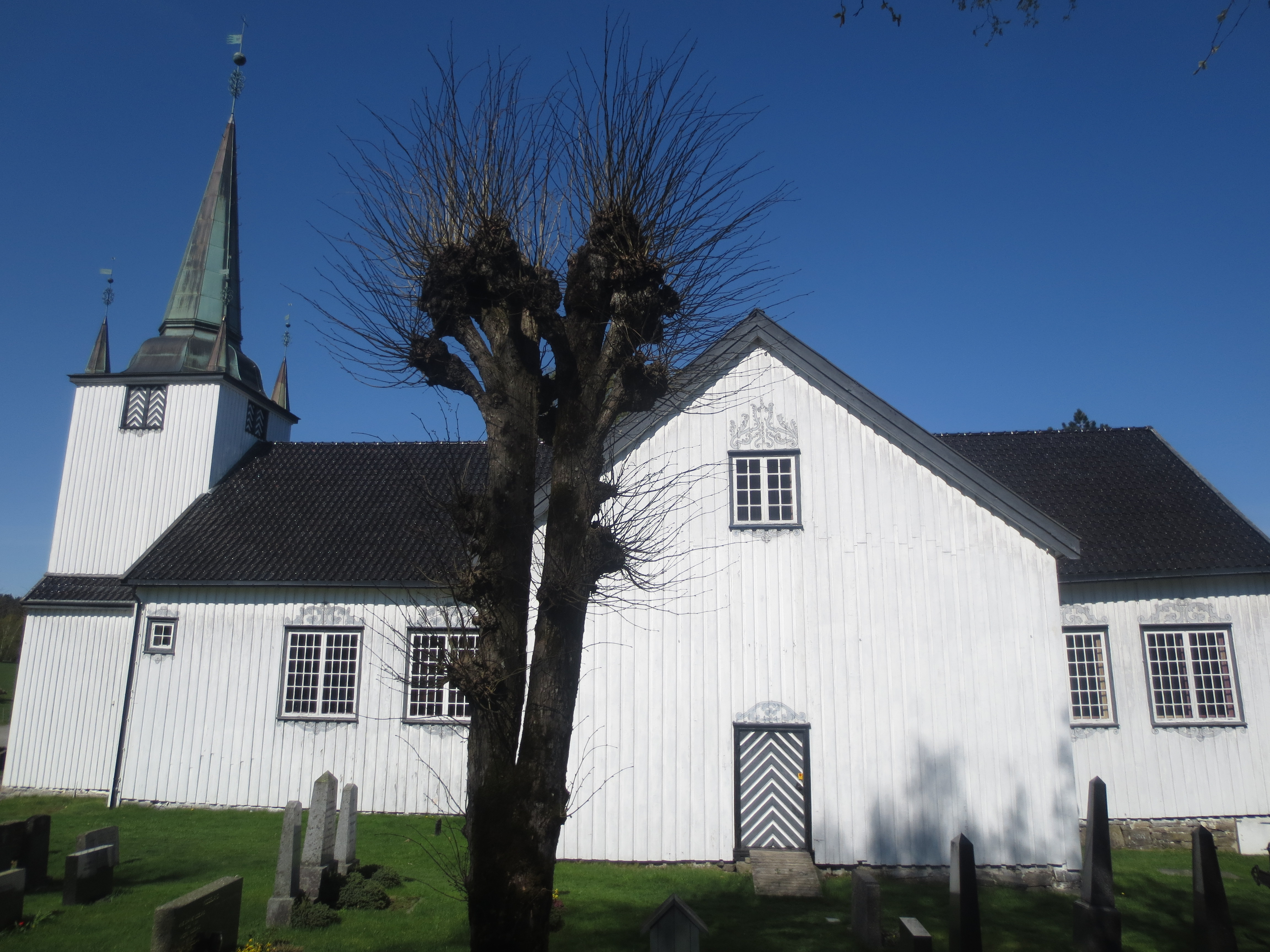

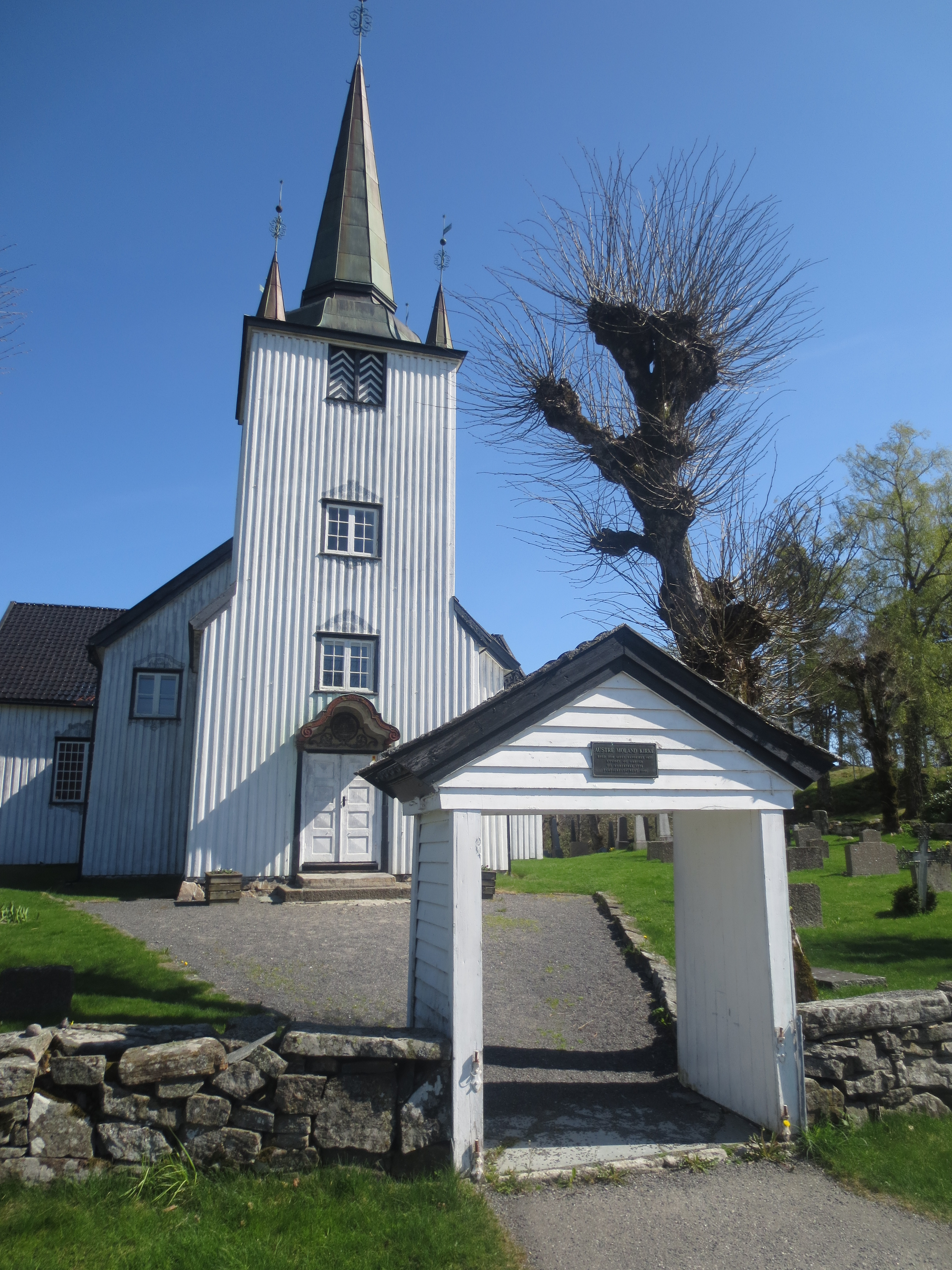

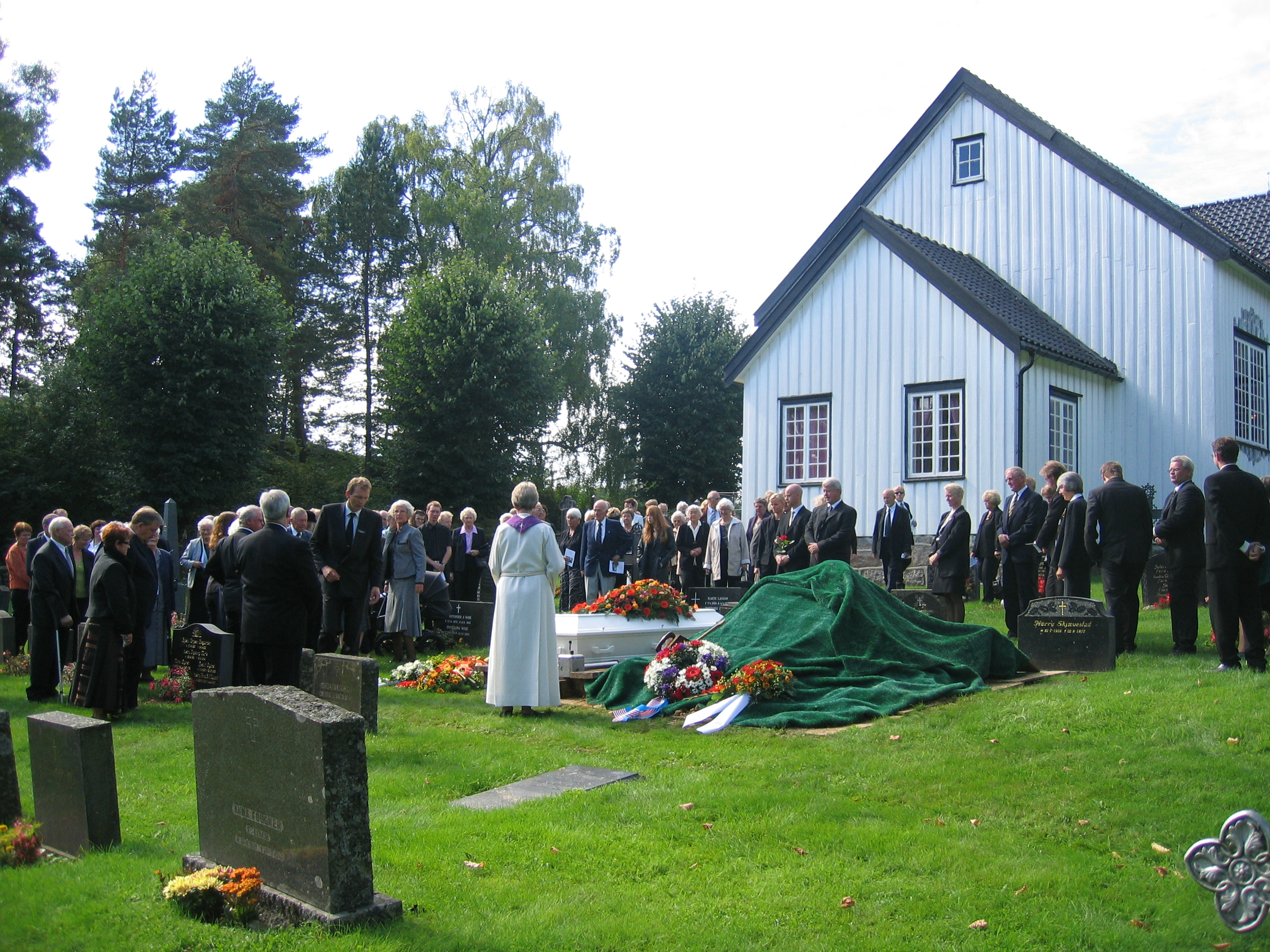

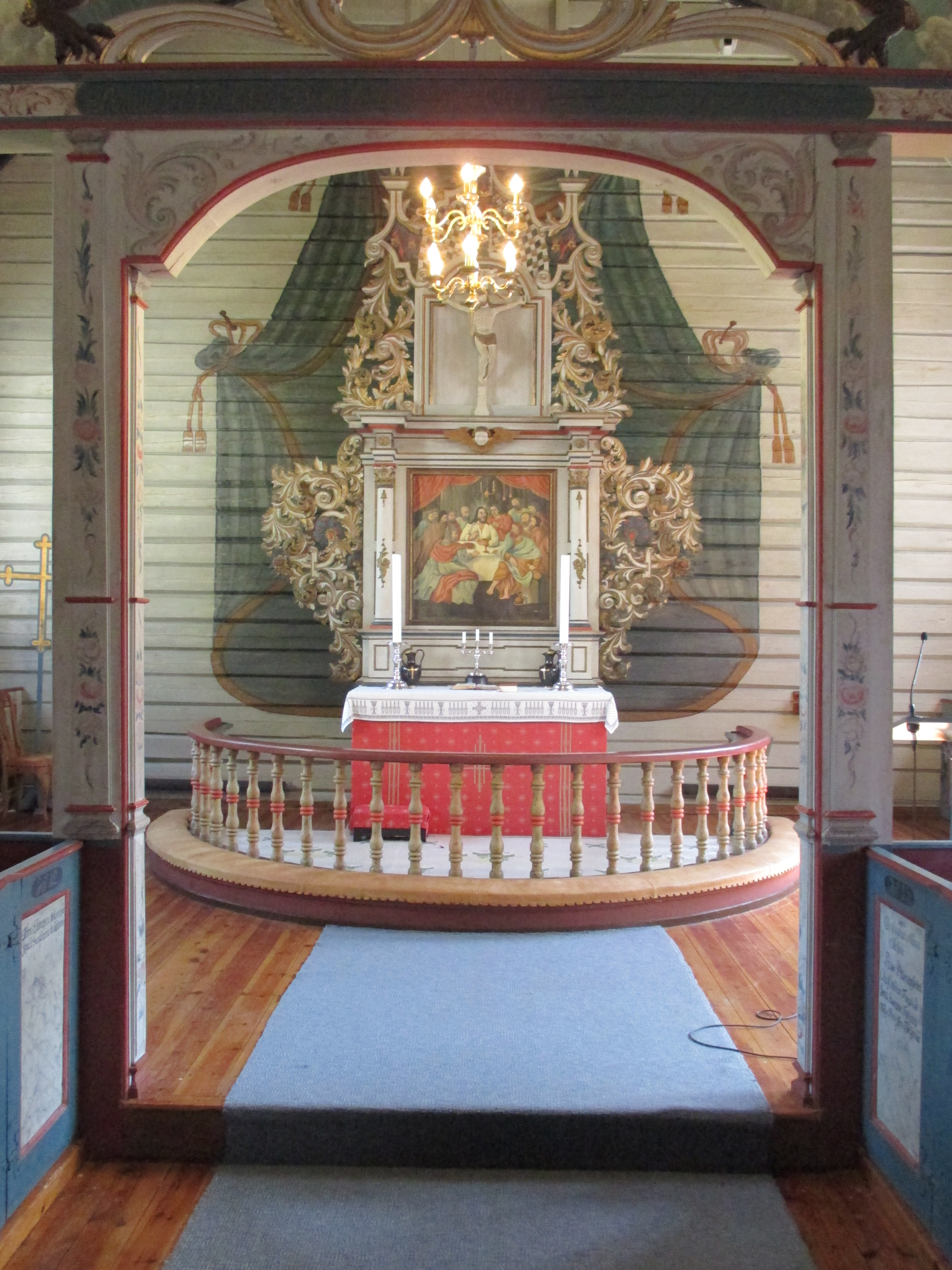

== See also ==
- List of churches in Agder og Telemark
