= Cris Brodahl =

Belgian artist

- Born: 1963 (age 62–63); Ghent, Belgium
- Known for: Visual art

Cris Brodahl (born 1963 in Ghent, Belgium) is a contemporary visual artist based in Ghent, Belgium. Brodahl's paintings are based on collages she makes from magazine images.

Cris Brodahl has shown internationally in exhibitions including Electric Blue at Xavier Hufkens in Brussels, Cut at The Approach in London, and Marc Foxx in Los Angeles.

Her work is in the collection of the Seattle Art Museum.
