= Doctor Medicinae (Danish and Norwegian degree) =

Danish and former Norwegian higher research doctorate in medicine

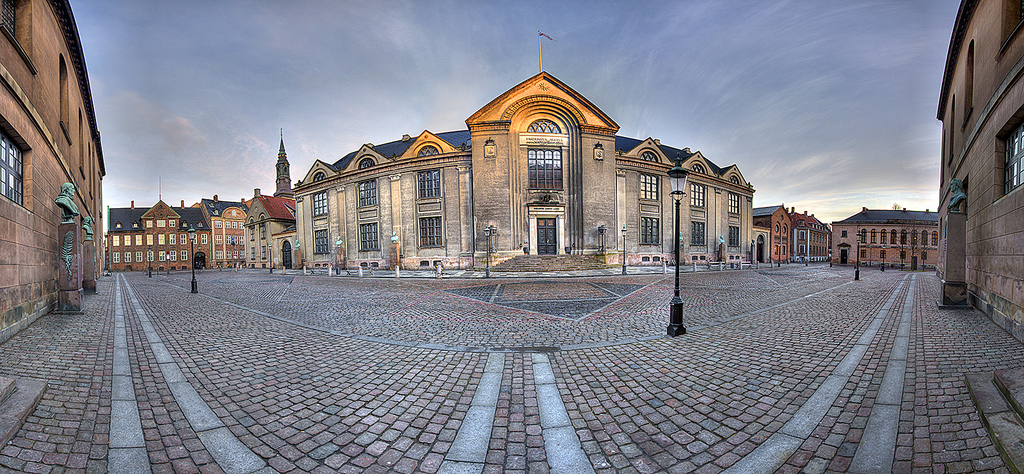
Main building of the University of Copenhagen

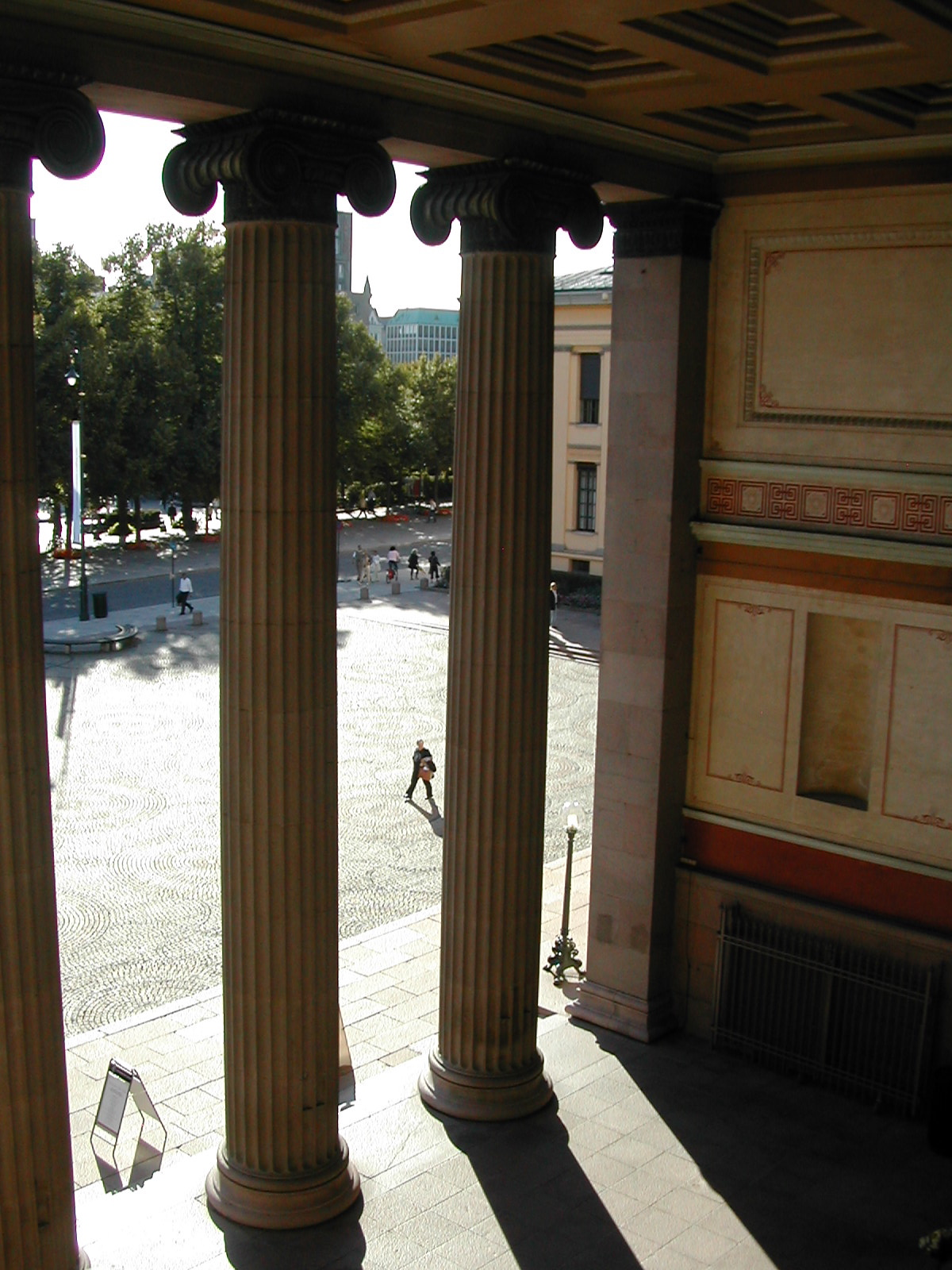
Main building of the University of Oslo (the Royal Frederick University), which started awarding the degree based on the Copenhagen regulations in 1817

Doctor Medicinae, also spelled Doctor Medicinæ and abbreviated Dr. Med., is a higher doctoral degree (a research doctorate) in medicine awarded by universities in Denmark and formerly in Norway. It is officially translated as Doctor of Medical Science (D.M.Sc.), corresponding to similarly named higher doctorates found in some Commonwealth countries. It is regarded as a higher doctorate and officially ranks above the Danish PhD degree.

Dr. Med. (Danish: dr.med.) is by law a higher degree than the Ph.D. (Danish: ph.d.-graden). A Dr.Med. degree is awarded in acknowledgement of substantial scientific insight and maturity of the author and it is a requirement that the dissertation, as a rule consisting of several articles published in high-impact journals, has advanced science substantially. The dissertation is assessed by a panel of external experts, chosen among the most distinguished scientists in the field internationally, who decides if the dissertation is acceptable for public defence. Until the 19th century, the licentiate degree was also a prerequisite for obtaining the Dr.Med. Today, the recently introduced Danish Ph.D. degree (officially the successor and equivalent of the former licentiate degree) is sometimes obtained before the Dr.Med. degree. According to the Danish Agency for International Education, "mature researchers may obtain the traditional higher Danish doctoral degree (doktorgrad), usually after a minimum of 5–8 years of individual and original research (following a candidatus degree [...] or a ph.d. degree in the relevant field of study) and public defence of a dissertation." The Dr.Med. degree is seldom obtained before the age of 40, and is normally conferred upon experienced consultants and scientists after about a decade of research.

== History ==
The degree has existed ever since the establishment of the University of Copenhagen in 1479, which was for centuries the only university of Denmark-Norway. The degree was first awarded by Norway's newly established Royal Frederick University in 1817 according to the regulations of the University of Copenhagen (despite Denmark and Norway no longer being in a personal union) and the Norwegian degree was a direct continuation of the Copenhagen degree, with Denmark and Norway largely sharing their degree system until 2003–2008, mutually recognizing the degrees as equivalent. In Norway, the Danish-based dr.med. degree was last awarded in 2008.

The Dr.Med. degree is officially a higher degree than the PhD, and is described by Danish authorities as a higher doctorate. The official English translation of the Dr.Med. degree is Doctor of Medical Science, D.M.Sc., the name of comparable degrees in Commonwealth countries that rank above the PhD; for instance the University of Sydney describes its comparable D.M.Sc. degree as "a higher doctorate [...] awarded for published work that, in the opinion of the examiners constitutes a distinguished contribution to knowledge or creative achievement and is recognized by scholars in the relevant field as constituting a distinguished contribution to knowledge or creative achievement in that filed. The DMedSc, unlike the Doctor of Philosophy (PhD), is not a research training degree. It may be described as an award that one would receive when one's career is well established, rather than at the beginning, for an outstanding contribution to knowledge through a substantial body of research."

A dissertation consists of a substantial body of work published in high-quality international academic journals, as a rule at least 4 or 5 high-quality international publications. In Norway the Dr.Med. degree could only be awarded to physicians, and thus required a Candidate of Medicine (Cand. Med.) degree (6–7 years of studies) or an equivalent foreign medical degree. Non-physicians who submitted dissertations to faculties of medicine were awarded the doctor of philosophy (dr.philos.) degree instead. In Denmark the Dr.Med. degree is traditionally only awarded to physicians, and non-physicians who wrote dissertations in biomedical research fields or other topics relevant to medicine were traditionally awarded the doctorate of philosophy (Dr. Phil.), later also newer degrees such as the doctorate of pharmacy (Dr.Pharm). However there are some examples of Danish pharmacists who hold the Dr. Med. degree.

The name of the degree can also be written as Doctor Medicinæ (Æ instead of AE). In Danish and Norwegian, the degree is, similarly to other Latin degrees, generally not capitalized (i.e. it's written as doctor medicinae or doctor medicinæ, and abbreviated dr. med.).

The degree should not be confused with the German degree Dr. med. In Dano-Norwegian tradition, the dr.med. is a degree above the PhD, as is established by law in Denmark, whereas the German Dr.med. is an entry-level research doctorate roughly corresponding to the PhD in the Anglo-Saxon system. The Danish (and former Norwegian) dr.med. degree is considered equivalent to the Habilitation in Germany, and also gives the same formal rights at the universities as a Habilitation, for example the right to supervise PhDs and the eligibility to become associate professor or professor (a Dr.Med. alone by definition automatically meets the requirements to become associate professor, whereas a full professorship requires an evaluation and usually additional publications). Whereas the German Dr.med. is often obtained in one to two years, the Danish (and former Norwegian) Dr.med. is seldom obtained in less than 5–8 years of research activity after graduation as a medical doctor, and those receiving a Dr.med. are typically mid-career to senior consultants in university hospitals. According to the Danish Agency for International Education, "mature researchers may obtain the traditional higher Danish doctoral degree (doktorgrad), usually after a minimum of 5–8 years of individual and original research (following a candidatus degree, a mag.art. degree or a ph.d. degree in the relevant field of study) and public defence of a dissertation."
