= List of members of the Storting, 1913–1915 =

List of all the members of the Storting in the period 1913 to 1915. The list includes all those initially elected to the Storting, the supreme legislature of Norway, as well as deputy representatives where available.

== Rural constituencies ==
=== Smaalenenes ===
| Constituency | Name | Party | Comments/Deputy |
|---|---|---|---|
| Eidsberg | Ludvig Larsen Kragtorp | Liberal Party | |
| Idde and Marker | Hans Theodor Hansen Bøen | Liberal Party | |
| Tune | Albert Theodor Alexius Moeskau | Labour Party | |
| Glemminge | Johannes Olaf Bergersen | Labour Party | |
| Rygge | Gunder Anton Jahren | Conservative Party | |

=== Akershus ===
| Constituency | Name | Party | Comments/Deputy |
|---|---|---|---|
| Bærum and Follo | Christian Fredrik Michelet | Conservative Party | Johan Knut Skancke (Coalition Party) |
| Aker | Edvard Hagerup Bull | Conservative Party | Johan Olaf Bredal (Free-minded Liberal Party) |
| Nedre Romerike | Finn Blakstad | Conservative Party | Konrad Hartvig Johansen Bergsjø (Free-minded Liberal Party) |
| Mellem Romerike | Martin Julius Halvorsen | Labour Party | |
| Øvre Romerike | Thorstein Fretheim | Liberal Party | |

=== Hedemarkens ===
| Constituency | Name | Party | Comments/Deputy |
|---|---|---|---|
| Nordre Hedemarken | Wollert Konow (H) | Radical People's Party | |
| Søndre Hedemarken | Karl Amundsen | Labour Party | |
| Vinger and Odalen | Ingebrigt Løberg | Radical People's Party | Otto Olsen Pramm (Liberal Party) |
| Solør | August Embretsen | Labour Party | Theodor Olsen Aaset |
| Søndre Østerdalen | Olav Andreas Eftestøl | Radical People's Party | |
| Nordre Østerdalen | Tore Embretsen Aaen | Liberal Party | |

=== Kristians ===
| Constituency | Name | Party | Comments/Deputy |
|---|---|---|---|
| Nordre Gudbrandsdalen | Edvard Olsen Landheim | Radical People's Party | |
| Søndre Gudbrandsdalen | Johan Castberg | Radical People's Party | Simen Olsen Kolstad |
| Toten | Alf Mjøen | Radical People's Party | Johan Castberg |
| Hadeland and Land | Ole Martin Lappen | Radical People's Party | |
| Valdres | Ole Gudbrandsen Hovi | Radical People's Party | |

=== Buskeruds ===
| Constituency | Name | Party | Comments/Deputy |
|---|---|---|---|
| Ringerike | Christopher Hornsrud | Labour Party | |
| Hallingdal | Kristen Christoffersen Kopseng | Free-minded Liberal Party | |
| Buskerud | Anders Jensen Horgen | Labour Party | |
| Numedal | Anton Martin Knudsen Omholt | Liberal Party | |

=== Jarlsberg and Larviks ===
| Constituency | Name | Party | Comments/Deputy |
|---|---|---|---|
| Skoger | Jørgen Hansen Gunnestad | Conservative Party | |
| Jarlsberg | Jonathan Johnson | Conservative Party | |
| Sandeherred | Fredrik Enge | Liberal Party | |
| Brunla | Fredrik Anton Martin Olsen Nalum | Liberal Party | |

=== Bratsberg ===
| Constituency | Name | Party | Comments/Deputy |
|---|---|---|---|
| Bamle | Peder (Eilertsen) Rinde | Liberal Party | |
| Gjerpen | Aanon Gunnar Knudsen | Liberal Party | Nils Gregoriussen Skilbred |
| Øst-Telemarken | Jørgen Gunnarson Løvland | Liberal Party | |
| Vest-Telemarken | Ivar Petterson Tveiten | Liberal Party | |

=== Nedenes ===
| Constituency | Name | Party | Comments/Deputy |
|---|---|---|---|
| Holt | Tallak Olsen Lindstøl | Liberal Party | |
| Nedenes | Guttorm Fløistad | Labour Party | Lars Mikael Larssen Bie |
| Sand | Noan Christian Gauslaa | Liberal Party | |
| Sætersdalen | Lars Knutson Liestøl | Liberal Party | Anders Kristensen Skaiaa. Liestøl died before the Storting was constituted. |

=== Lister and Mandals ===
| Constituency | Name | Party | Comments/Deputy |
|---|---|---|---|
| Oddernes | Endre Asbjørnsen Ugland | Liberal Party | Hans Syvertsen Nyvold |
| Mandalen | Thore Torkildsen Foss | Liberal Party | Andreas Jonson Kaddeland. Upon Foss's death Kaddeland stepped in as representative. |
| Lyngdal | Aasulv Olsen Bryggesaa | Liberal Party | Gunnuf Jakobsen Eiesland |
| Lister | Karl Sanne | Conservative Party | |

=== Stavanger ===
| Constituency | Name | Party | Comments/Deputy |
|---|---|---|---|
| Dalene | Tollef Asbjørnsen Gjedrem | Liberal Party | Erik Hadland Torjusen |
| Jæderen | Thore Larsen Braut | Liberal Party | |
| Hesbø and Hafrsfjord | Jacob Kristensen Austbø | Liberal Party | |
| Karmsund | Thomas Wegner Larsen Haaland | Liberal Party | |
| Ryfylke | Lars Rasmussen | Liberal Party | Rasmus Jakobsen Hidle |

=== Søndre Bergenhus ===
| Constituency | Name | Party | Comments/Deputy |
|---|---|---|---|
| Ytre Søndhordland | Iver Jonassen Svendsbøe | Free-minded Liberal Party | |
| Indre Søndhordland | Olav Jensen Myklebust | Liberal Party | Lars Bernhardus Sunde |
| Midthordland | Lars Kristian Abrahamsen | Liberal Party | Gutorm Mikkelsen Lid |
| Nordhordland | Lars Nilssen Sæim | Liberal Party | Magne Johansen Rongved |
| Voss | Ole Monsen Mjelde | Liberal Party | |
| Hardanger | Nils Nilsson Skaar | Liberal Party | |

=== Nordre Bergenhus ===
| Constituency | Name | Party | Comments/Deputy |
|---|---|---|---|
| Indre Sogn | Sjur Torleifsen Næss | Liberal Party | |
| Ytre Sogn | Lasse Torkelson Trædal | Liberal Party | |
| Søndfjord | David Olsen Bakke | Liberal Party | |
| Kinn | Kristofer Pedersen Indrehus | Liberal Party | Magnus Nilssøn Seim |
| Nordfjord | Sigmund Kolbeinsen Aarnes | Liberal Party | Apollonius Liljedahl Johannessen Rosenlund |

=== Romsdals ===
| Constituency | Name | Party | Comments/Deputy |
|---|---|---|---|
| Søndre Søndmør | Anders Rasmussen Vassbotn | Liberal Party | |
| Nordre Søndmør | Knut Severin Jonas Olsen Otterlei | Liberal Party | |
| Romsdal | Birger Stuevold-Hansen | Liberal Party | Iver Andreas Rasmussen Ræstad |
| Søndre Nordmør | Peder Bjørn Kristvik | Liberal Party | Jakob Larsen Mork |
| Nordre Nordmør | Nils Johansen Hestnes | Liberal Party | Sivert Sivertsen Glærum |

=== Søndre Trondhjems ===
| Constituency | Name | Party | Comments/Deputy |
|---|---|---|---|
| Ytre Fosen | Johan Sedelen Stinessen | Liberal Party | |
| Indre Fosen | Benjamin Olsen Schei | Liberal Party | |
| Orkedalen | John Iversen Wolden | Liberal Party | |
| Guldalen | Anders Olsen Bergan | Liberal Party | |
| Strinden | Paul Andreas Olsen Fjermstad | Liberal Party | Peder Johannes Norbye |

=== Nordre Trondhjems ===
| Constituency | Name | Party | Comments/Deputy |
|---|---|---|---|
| Stjørdalen | Andreas Galtvik | Liberal Party | |
| Værdalen | Karl Hagerup | Liberal Party | |
| Snaasen | Ivar Aavatsmark | Liberal Party | Lorents Mørkved |
| Namdalen | Christoffer Inderberg | Liberal Party | |

=== Nordlands ===
| Constituency | Name | Party | Comments/Deputy |
|---|---|---|---|
| Søndre Helgeland | Andreas Kristian Andersen Grimsø | Liberal Party | |
| Nordre Helgeland | Nils Jørgen August Mikalsen Kulstad | Liberal Party | |
| Søndre Salten | Olaf Amundsen | Liberal Party | |
| Nordre Salten | Rolf Jacobsen | Liberal Party | |
| Lofoten | Edvard Nikolai Joakimsen | Liberal Party | Jonas Pedersen |
| Vesteraalen | Carl Martin Ellingsen | Liberal Party | |

=== Tromsø ===
| Constituency | Name | Party | Comments/Deputy |
|---|---|---|---|
| Trondenes | Jørgen Julius Pedersen | Liberal Party | |
| Senjen | Meyer Nilsen Foshaug | Labour Party | |
| Tromsøsundet | Ole Martin Pettersen Gausdal | Labour Party | |

=== Finmarkens ===
| Constituency | Name | Party | Comments/Deputy |
|---|---|---|---|
| Vestfinmarken | Johannes Gjetmundsen | Liberal Party | |
| Østfinmarken | Hagbarth Lund | Liberal Party | |

== Urban constituencies ==
=== Fredrikshald ===
| Constituency | Name | Party | Comments/Deputy |
|---|---|---|---|
| | Hans Andreas Hanssen | Labour Party | |

=== Sarpsborg ===
| Constituency | Name | Party | Comments/Deputy |
|---|---|---|---|
| | Ludvig Elmar Hegge Olsen Enge | Labour Party | |

=== Fredrikstad ===
| Constituency | Name | Party | Comments/Deputy |
|---|---|---|---|
| | Wilhelm Ernst Ramm | Conservative Party | |

=== Moss and Drøbak ===
| Constituency | Name | Party | Comments/Deputy |
|---|---|---|---|
| | Carl Edvard Jenssen | Labour Party | |

=== Kristiania ===
| Constituency | Name | Party | Comments/Deputy |
|---|---|---|---|
| Oslo | Magnus Nilssen | Labour Party | Ivar Jørgensen |
| Grünerløkken | Christian Holtermann Knudsen | Labour Party | |
| Gamle Aker | Otto B. Halvorsen | Conservative Party | Elias Nicolai Reksten |
| Hammersborg | Olaf Rustad | Conservative Party | Arthur Skjelderup |
| Uranienborg | Nils Yngvar Ustvedt | Conservative Party | Hans Horn |

=== Lillehammer, Hamar, Gjøvik and Kongsvinger ===
| Constituency | Name | Party | Comments/Deputy |
|---|---|---|---|
| | Axel Andreas Thallaug | Conservative Party | |

=== Drammen ===
| Constituency | Name | Party | Comments/Deputy |
|---|---|---|---|
| Bragernes | Hans Hansen | Conservative Party | Carl Christian August Jacob Bonnevie (Free-minded Liberal Party) |
| Strømsø and Tangen | Vilhelm Edvard Karl Nagel | Labour Party | |

=== Kongsberg and Hønefoss ===
| Constituency | Name | Party | Comments/Deputy |
|---|---|---|---|
| | Nils Gulliksen Berg | Liberal Party | |

=== Horten ===
| Constituency | Name | Party | Comments/Deputy |
|---|---|---|---|
| | Christian Sparre | Liberal Party | |

=== Tønsberg ===
| Constituency | Name | Party | Comments/Deputy |
|---|---|---|---|
| | Asbjørn Balthazar Syrrist | Conservative Party | |

=== Larvik and Sandefjord ===
| Constituency | Name | Party | Comments/Deputy |
|---|---|---|---|
| | Hans Ludvig Meyer | Conservative Party | Julius Christensen |

=== Brevik and Holmestrand ===
| Constituency | Name | Party | Comments/Deputy |
|---|---|---|---|
| | Rikard Olsen | Liberal Party | Otto Ruberg |

=== Porsgrund ===
| Constituency | Name | Party | Comments/Deputy |
|---|---|---|---|
| | Peter Karl Holmesland | Liberal Party | |

=== Skien ===
| Constituency | Name | Party | Comments/Deputy |
|---|---|---|---|
| | Andreas Sigurdsen | Liberal Party | |

=== Kragerø ===
| Constituency | Name | Party | Comments/Deputy |
|---|---|---|---|
| | Godske Joachim Weidemann Nielsen | Conservative Party | Simon Nicolay Wiborg (Free-minded Liberal Party) |

=== Risør ===
| Constituency | Name | Party | Comments/Deputy |
|---|---|---|---|
| | Arnt Severin Ulstrup | Conservative Party | Johan Arndt |

=== Arendal and Grimstad ===
| Constituency | Name | Party | Comments/Deputy |
|---|---|---|---|
| | Henrik Roardsen Spangelo | Free-minded Liberal Party | |

=== Kristiansand ===
| Constituency | Name | Party | Comments/Deputy |
|---|---|---|---|
| Fæstningen | Edward August Gundersen | Liberal Party (Abstinence Party) | Rudolf Torjusen |
| Baneheien | Rudolf Elias Peersen | Liberal Party | |

=== Flekkefjord ===
| Constituency | Name | Party | Comments/Deputy |
|---|---|---|---|
| | Cornelius Bernhard Hanssen | Free-minded Liberal Party | Engvald Bertram Hansen |

=== Stavanger ===
| Constituency | Name | Party | Comments/Deputy |
|---|---|---|---|
| Holmen | Søren Tobias Aarstad | Liberal Party | Peder Pedersen Næsheim |
| Verket | Johan David Haslund Gjøstein | Labour Party | |

=== Haugesund ===
| Constituency | Name | Party | Comments/Deputy |
|---|---|---|---|
| | Valentin Valentinsen | Liberal Party | Carl Magne Rønnevig |

=== Bergen ===
| Constituency | Name | Party | Comments/Deputy |
|---|---|---|---|
| Nygaard | Henrik Ameln | Conservative Party | |
| Nordnes | Johan Ludwig Mowinckel | Liberal Party | |
| Kalfaret | Johan Samuelsen | Labour Party | |
| Sandviken | Lars Olsen Sæbø | Labour Party | Johan Gudmundsen |

=== Aalesund and Molde ===
| Constituency | Name | Party | Comments/Deputy |
|---|---|---|---|
| | Kristian Friis Petersen | Liberal Party | Ole Gustav Barman |

=== Kristiansund ===
| Constituency | Name | Party | Comments/Deputy |
|---|---|---|---|
| | Jonas Hestnes | Liberal Party | Ivar Børresen Grønningsæter |

=== Trondhjem and Levanger ===
| Constituency | Name | Party | Comments/Deputy |
|---|---|---|---|
| Bratøren and Ilen | Ole Erichsen | Conservative Party | Johan Rønning (Frisinnede Venstre) |
| Kalvskindet (med Levanger) | Hans Bauck | Conservative Party | |
| Baklandet | Ole Konrad Ribsskog | Labour Party | |
| Lademoen | Anders Buen | Labour Party | |

=== Bodø and Narvik ===
| Constituency | Name | Party | Comments/Deputy |
|---|---|---|---|
| | Carl Emil Christian Bonnevie | Labour Party | |

=== Tromsø ===
| Constituency | Name | Party | Comments/Deputy |
|---|---|---|---|
| | Bastian Thomas Laurits Eidem | Liberal Party | |

=== Hammerfest, Vardø and Vadsø ===
| Constituency | Name | Party | Comments/Deputy |
|---|---|---|---|
| | Haakon Sæmingsen Grindalen Finstad | Labour Party | |
