= Holtsmark =

Holtsmark is a surname. Notable people with the surname include:

- Anne Holtsmark (1896–1974), Norwegian philologist
- Bent Holtsmark (1823–1903), Norwegian politician
- Bernt Holtsmark (1859–1941), Norwegian politician
- Gabriel Gabrielsen Holtsmark (1867–1954), Norwegian educator, physicist and actuary
- Johan Peter Holtsmark (1894–1975), Norwegian physicist
- Karen Holtsmark (1907–1998), Norwegian painter
- Torger Holtsmark (1863–1926), Norwegian politician
