= Blakstad =

Blakstad may refer to:

== Places ==
- Blakstad, Agder, the municipal center of Froland municipality, Agder county, Norway
  - Blakstad Station, a railway station in Froland municipality, Agder county, Norway
- Blakstad, Akershus, a village in Asker municipality, Akershus county, Norway

== People ==
- Bjørn Blakstad (1926-2012), a Norwegian diplomat
- Eli Blakstad (born 1962), a Norwegian politician for the Centre Party
- Even Blakstad (born 1968), a retired Norwegian football defender
- Finn Blakstad (1865-1941), a Norwegian farmer and politician for the Conservative Party
- Gudolf Blakstad (1893-1985), a Norwegian architect
- Michael Blakstad (born 1940), a television producer and a former Editor of Tomorrow's World on the BBC
- Ragnvald Blakstad (1866-1929), a Norwegian industrialist and hydropower pioneer
- Wilhelm Blakstad (1863-1936), a Norwegian politician for the Conservative Party
