= Johan M. Schie =

Norwegian politician

Johan M. Schie (19 March 1863 – 11 April 1942) was a Norwegian farmer and politician for the Liberal Party.

He was a farmer and bank treasurer in Rakkestad. He fielded as the Liberal Party candidate in several parliamentary elections, the first time in 1909. In the first round he received 660 votes and lost to Labour's Albert Theodor Alexius Moeskau, Conservative Knut Edvart Jahren and the Church Party's O. J. Heier. Schie's running mate was P. P. Elind. There was subsequently a run-off vote, where the Conservative and the Church Party fielded a duo of Gunnerius Furuholmen and Knut Edvart Jahren, edging out Moeskau. Schie received 861 votes and ended a distant third. In 1912, he was fielded as the running mate of Liberal's Hans Strømsæther. Labour's candidate Moeskau prevailed.

In 1915, Strømsæther briefly fielded for the Totallers' Party and Schie was the Liberal top candidate again. They lost to Moeskau and Jahren in the first round, but in the run-off, the bourgeois parties fielded a cooperative ballot to prevent Moeskau recapturing the seat. The Conservative's Knut Edvart Jahren was elected as MP, with Schie as running mate. Schie subsequently served as deputy member of the Parliament of Norway for the term 1916–1918.

He died in April 1942.
