= Wilhelm Blakstad =

Norwegian politician (1863–1936)

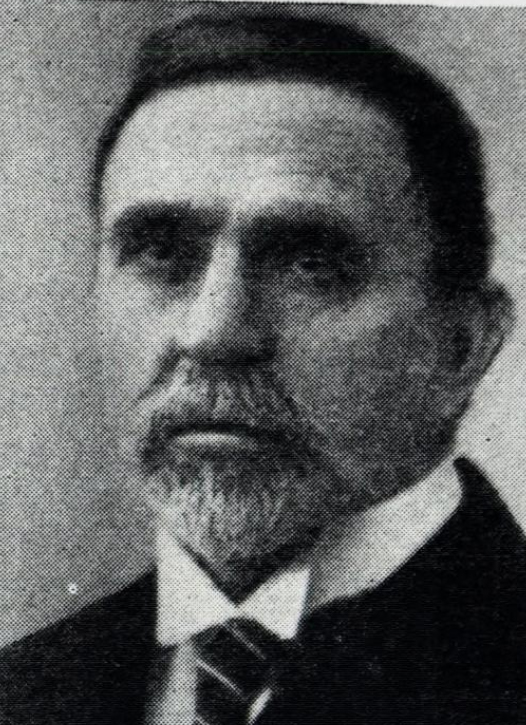

Member of Parliament
- In office 1919–1933

Personal details
- Born: 2 February 1863 Asker
- Died: 4 January 1936 (aged 72)
- Party: Conservative
- Relations: Finn Blakstad (brother); Ragnvald Blakstad (brother); Bernt Holtsmark (first cousin); Torger Holtsmark (first cousin)
- Children: Gudolf Blakstad

Wilhelm Blakstad (2 February 1863 – 4 January 1936) was a Norwegian politician for the Conservative Party.

== Personal life ==
He was born at Blakstad farm in Asker as a son of Erik Jørgensen Blakstad (1827–1890) and his wife Laura Gabrielsen (1832–1868). He was married to Gønner Kjos (1855–1932), and was the father of architect Gudolf Blakstad. Wilhelm Blakstad was also a brother of Finn and Ragnvald Blakstad and a first cousin of Torger, Wilhelm and Bernt Holtsmark.

== Career ==
He took his education at Trondhjem Technical School from 1879 to 1881 and the Higher College of Agriculture at Aas from 1885 to 1886. After a strain of various jobs he worked as an engineer from 1886 to 1892, and then as a log driving inspector in the Skien Watershed from 1892 to 1898. From 1902 he was the director of log driving in Lower Glomma, based in Fredrikstad (Fredrikstad Tømmerdirektion).

He was elected to Fredrikstad city council in 1907, and served as mayor from 1910 to 1918. From 1916 to 1918 he was a deputy member of the Norwegian Parliament, from 1918 to 1920 he was a board member of the Norwegian Association of Engineers, and from 1918 to 1921 he was a member of the supervisory committee of the Østfold Line. He was elected to the Norwegian Parliament for the first time in 1918, and was re-elected on four occasions, his last term ending in 1933. He died in 1936.

The road W. Blakstads gate in Fredrikstad has been named after him. A bust of Blakstad, sculpted by Waldemar Sefsland Dahl, stands outside the old headquarters of Fredrikstad Tømmerdirektion.
