= Ragnvald Berg =

Norwegian farmer and politician

Ragnvald Berg (18 May 1870 – 12 August 1946) was a Norwegian farmer and politician for the Liberal and Liberal Left parties.

He was born on Tufte in Stokke as a son of farmers Jørgen Hammelow Berg and Anne Margrethe née Hansen. He attended middle school and from 1887 to 1888 Jønsberg agricultural school. He took over the family farm, which he ran for his entire life.

Berg served as a member of Stokke municipal council for several years, including a period as mayor from 1905 to 1910.

Berg was elected as a deputy representative to the Parliament of Norway from the single-member constituency Sandeherred in 1906 and 1918. In 1906, he fielded as the running mate of Johan Gustav Austeen. Both belonged to the Liberal Party, but with Austeen also pledging to the Coalition Party. Austeen and Berg barely managed to carry over 50% of the vote, eliminating the need for a run-off election. In 1918, Berg ran on a joint ticket of the Conservative and Liberal Left parties with Conservative Ole Wegger as the main candidate. They carried their constituency in the first round. Berg met in parliamentary session from June to July 1919 and January to May 1920.
