= 1922 Norwegian local elections =

Municipality elections were held in Norway in 1922.

== Result of municipal elections ==
Results of the 1922 municipal elections. Results can only be given separately by rural areas and cities.

=== Cities ===
Party	Votes	%
Conservative Party–Free-minded Liberal Party		39.0
Labour Party		33.7
Social Democratic Labour Party		11.0
Liberal Party		6.0
Temperance Party		4.9
Radical People's Party		0.2
Others		5.2
Total		

=== Rural areas ===
Party	Votes	%
Labour Party		22.6
Farmers' Party		14.5
Liberal Party		9.5
Conservative Party–Free-minded Liberal Party		9.1
Social Democratic Labour Party		6.8
Riksmål Party		0.3
Temperance Party		0.3
Joint lists and others		36.4
Total		

=== National daily newspapers ===
Newspaper	Party endorsed	Notes
Gudbrandsdalens Social-Demokrat	Labour Party	
