= Anders Jensen Horgen =

Norwegian politician

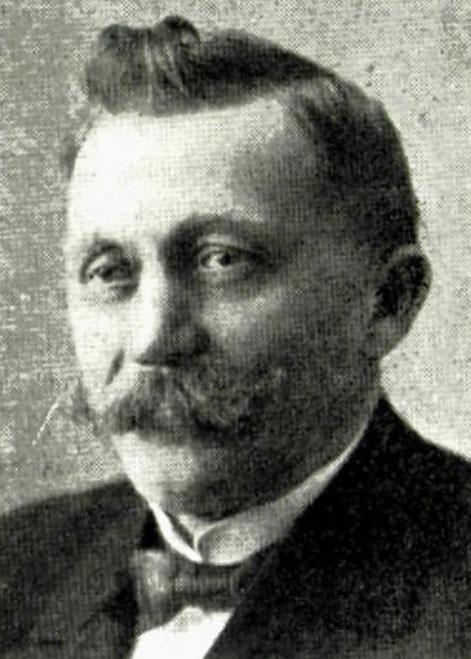
Portrait of Anders Jensen Horgen

Anders Jensen Horgen (11 March 1861 – 2 June 1947) was a Norwegian farmer and politician for the Labour, Social Democratic Labour and Communist parties.

== Biography ==
He was born as Anders Jensen in Hokksund as a son of fisher Jens Jakob Paulsen (1832–1865) and Regine Christensdatter (1831–1913). After basic schooling he worked in timber floating and timber trade, commencing merchantry in his homedistrict Øvre Eiker in 1898. In 1902 he moved to the farm Horgen in Nedre Eiker, running it for the rest of his life.

He was supposedly converted to socialism in 1888 after participating in the liberal workers' movement, where he met and heard Christian Holtermann Knudsen and Christopher Hornsrud. He was first elected to Øvre Eiker municipal council in 1898, and served as mayor from 1907 to 1916. He first fielded for parliamentary election in 1909. With shoemaker Bøhmer as his running mate, he carried the sub-constituencies Nedre Eiker, Røken and Hurum, but lost Lier to Conservative candidate Torger Holtsmark with quite a margin. In total Horgen had 1,904 votes compared to Holtsmark's 2,056, so a second round was necessary. Here, Holtsmark edged out Horgen with 2,951 to 2,504 votes.

He was elected to the Parliament of Norway from the constituency Buskerud in 1912, 1915 and 1918, serving three terms. In 1921 he joined the new Social Democratic Labour Party, and headed their ballot in Buskerud in the 1921. The party got the fewest votes, and he was not elected. By 1930, the two parties had merged, but Horgen had instead joined the Communist Party. He stood on second place on their unprevailing ballot in the 1930 election. He died in June 1947.
