= 1919 Norwegian local elections =

Municipality elections were held in Norway in 1919.

== Result of municipal elections ==
Results of the 1919 municipal elections. Results can only be given separately by rural areas and cities.

=== Cities ===
Party	Votes	%
Conservative Party–Free-minded Liberal Party		41.8
Labour Party		37.6
Liberal Party		8.2
Temperance Party		5.9
Radical People's Party		0.2
Others		6.2
Total		

=== Rural areas ===
Party	Votes	%
Labour Party		27.0
Liberal Party		16.6
Conservative Party–Free-minded Liberal Party		12.0
Social Democratic Labour Party		6.8
Radical People's Party		2.6
Temperance Party		0.5
Riksmål Party		0.2
Joint lists and others		41.1
Total		
