= Furuholmen =

Furuholmen is a Norwegian surname. Notable people with the surname include:

- Gunnerius Furuholmen (1861–1947), Norwegian engineer and politician
- Magne Furuholmen (born 1962), Norwegian musician and visual artist, and member of the band A-ha
