= 1931 Norwegian local elections =

== Result of municipal elections ==
Results of the 1931 municipal elections.

Party	Votes	%
Labour Party		36.0
Conservative Party–Free-minded Liberal Party		16.3
Liberal Party–Radical People's Party		11.6
Farmers' Party		9.1
Communist Party		2.5
Joint lists and others		24.5
Total		

=== National daily newspapers ===
Newspaper	Party endorsed	Notes
Aftenposten	Conservative Party	
Nordlands Framtid	Labour Party	
