= Johan Peter Weisse =

Norwegian philologist

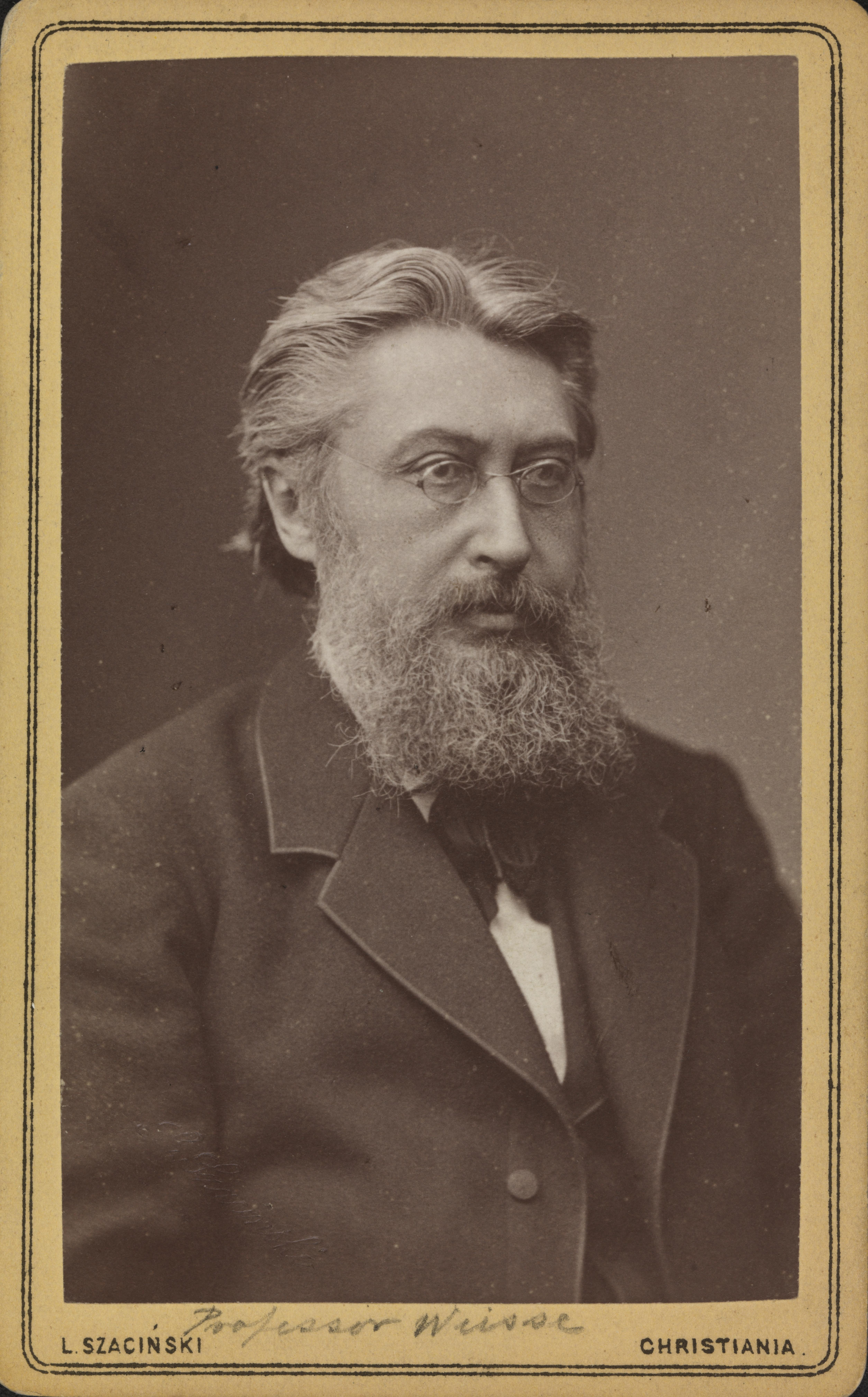
Johan Peter Weisse in 1881.

Johan Peter Weisse (13 August 1832 – 7 March 1886) was a Norwegian philologist.

== Personal life ==
He was born in Fluberg as a son of physician Joachim Frederik Weisse and his wife Grethe Fleischer. His grandfather had migrated to Norway from Brandenburg. The family moved to Trondhjem in 1833.

He married his own cousin Maja Stang (1843–1916) in July 1863 in Fredrikshald. She was an aunt of engineer Olaf Stang. In May 1893 one of their daughters married politician Gabriel Gabrielsen Holtsmark. Through them, Weisse was the maternal grandfather of professor Johan Peter Holtsmark, professor Anne Holtsmark and painter Karen Holtsmark.

== Career ==
He took his examen artium at Trondhjem Cathedral School in 1850. He read languages such as Norse, Anglo-Saxon, Gothic, Old Danish, Old Swedish, Greek, Latin, Russian and Cuneiform script already at that time, as witnessed by his diary Litterær Dagbog. He started studying philology in 1851. From 1853 to 1855 he had to stay in Rome because of health issues, but he studied the city vividly. He was a part of a Nordic intellectual group here, which included Julius Middelthun, Christoffer Borch, Georg Forchhammer and Niels Ravnkilde. He finally graduated from the Royal Frederick University with the cand.philol. degree in 1858.

In October 1858 he was hired as co-editor (together with Nicolai Mejdell) of the newspaper Christiania-Posten. He is remembered for writing political and satirical commentary, and a 25-piece series between July 1859 and January 1860 on Italian history and society, marking himself as a supporter of Camillo Cavour. In early 1861 Weisse was hired as teacher at Trondhjem Cathedral School. He stayed here until September 1865, when he changed to Fredrikshalds lærde og realskole. From June 1874 to April 1875 he worked at Christiania Cathedral School, and from April 1875 he was an inspector at Aars og Voss School. In November and December 1875 he held trial lectures for the position as professor at the Royal Frederick University, and he was appointed on 23 December in competition with Jan Johanssen. He was a member of the Norwegian Academy of Science and Letters from 1879. He continued as professor until his death, and also held numerous popular lectures. His obituary in Dagbladet read that Weisse wanted to "form men and not mere objects for examination".

He contributed "significantly" to Marius Nygaard's textbooks on Old Norse, first published in 1871. In 1871, Weisse released his own Latin grammar, Latinsk Grammatik til Skolebrug, but it was considered too difficult for school students, and was out-competed by Emil Schreiner's Latinsk Sproglære. The dominating Latin-Norwegian dictionary was later released by Schreiner, Nygaard and Johanssen. Schreiner sat on the committee that hired Weisse as professor in 1875.

Weisse died from a stroke in March 1886. He was buried at Vår Frelsers gravlund.
