= Jon Hol =

Norwegian engineer and activist

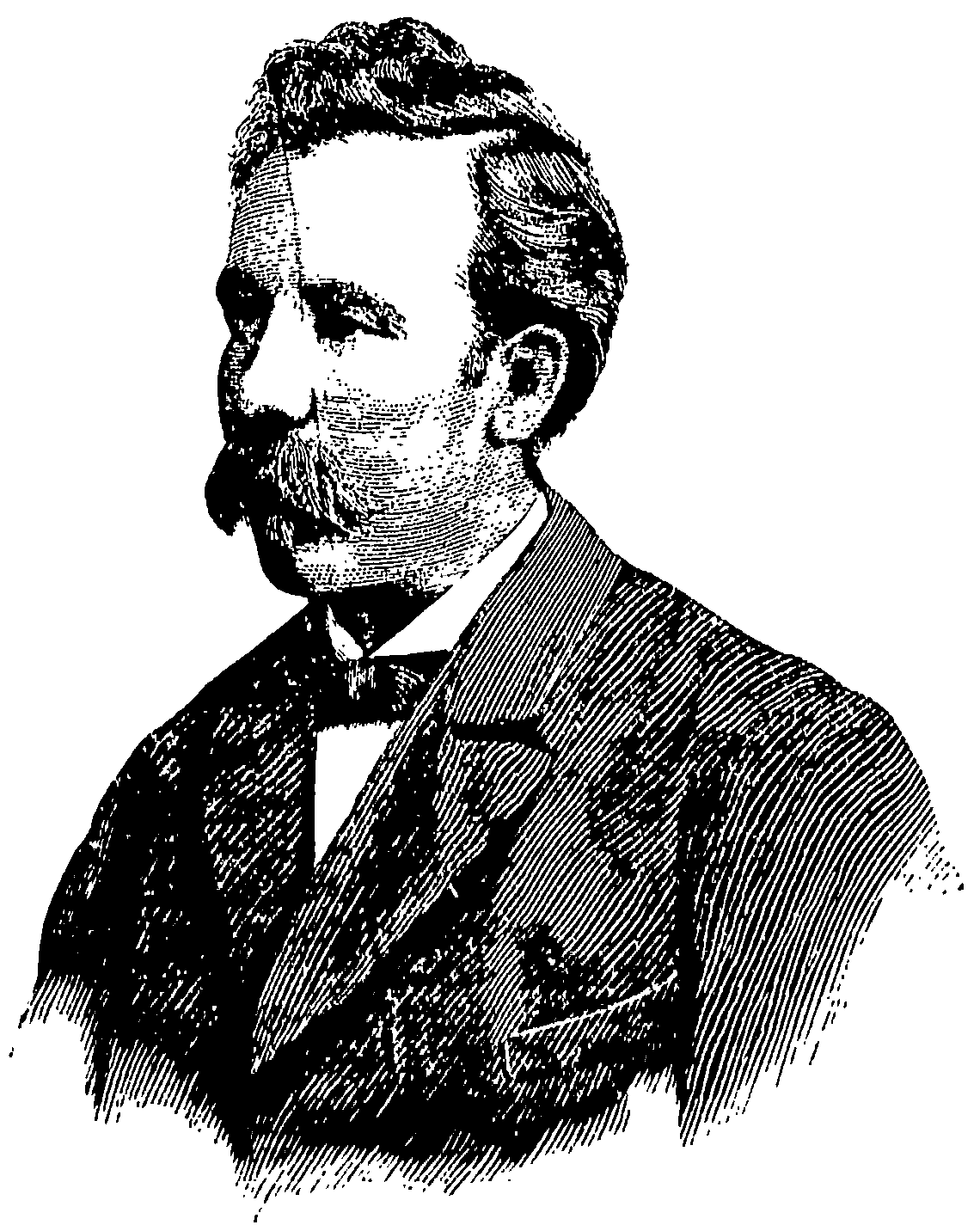
- Illustration from Verdens Gang, 1884.
- Born: c. 1851; Nord-Odal Municipality, Norway
- Died: 1941, before 16 May (aged 89)
- Occupation: Engineer
- Known for: Engineering work Activism: Writer in newspapers; Trade unionism; Advocate of government change (before 1884); Advocate of rifle associations; Rifleringen pamphlet (1884); Local politician, parliamentary candidate

Jon Gundersen Hol (c. 1851 – 1941) was a Norwegian engineer and activist. He is known for his pamphlet Rifleringen, published in February 1884, that resulted in his arrest for lèse majesté. In the pamphlet, he called for soldiers and civilians to arm themselves and encircle the Parliament of Norway Building, creating a "Ring of Rifles", should the need arise. The political situation in Norway at the time was unstable, with an ongoing impeachment case against the conservative government started by political liberals. King Oscar II of Sweden and Norway supported the conservative politicians, and Hol believed that a political and military counter-offensive was planned, hence the need for guarding the Parliament. The tensions between liberals and conservatives drew Hol into politics in the first place in 1880. Before this, he was an engineer by occupation and a writer, albeit apolitical. He increased his writing after 1880, and also involved himself in non-socialist trade unions, including the unsuccessful attempt of establishing a national trade union center in Kristiania.

When the conservatives lost the Impeachment case, there was a change of government and the charges against Hol were dropped. Two years later, he received an economic compensation from the Parliament. After some quiet years in which he concentrated on engineering work, Hol returned to politics as a member of the municipal council of Skien Municipality, representing the local temperance movement. He stood for parliamentary election twice, without success.

== Early life ==
Hol was born at the farm Ekornhol in Nord-Odal Municipality, the son of Gunder Johnsen and Rønnaug Haakonsdatter. He began a military education in 1869, and later conducted self-studies as well as attending various schools, including the Norwegian National Academy of Craft and Art Industry. In 1876, he married Karen Pedersdatter, a farmers' daughter from Sør-Odal Municipality and in 1878, he was hired by the city engineering corps of Kristiania.

== Political activism ==
=== Background ===
While studying, Hol became interested in journalism. He began writing for the apolitical magazine Norsk Nationaltidende in 1877, but found his interest in politics growing as he observed the mounting political turmoil at the time. Liberal politicians in the Norwegian Parliament struggled to introduce the practice of calling government ministers in for questioning. Initially, this was not meant to function as a lever against individual ministers, but rather to increase debate on important issues. The executive branch of government was not elected, and the intention was to enhance a co-governing with the democratically elected legislature. Also, ministers were already criticized in parliamentary debates; if they were questioned in person they would have the chance to defend themselves. This required altering the Constitution, a move which the executive branch, led by King Oscar II of Sweden and Norway, continuously vetoed. The conservatives in Parliament also opposed this, fearing that the increasingly liberal-dominated parliament would use constitutional change to check the executive branch, and thereby infringe upon the separation of powers. The first royal veto came in 1872, after which the proposition was slightly altered, but it was vetoed again in 1874. Two identical propositions followed, and were defeated, in 1877 and 1880. After 1880, the question about ministers faded into the background; instead the disagreement centered around the King's right to a veto in constitutional cases. According to the Constitution, the King had the right to postpone a non-constitutional act three times. On the other hand, the Constitution did not mention any veto in constitutional cases. Three views became distinct: some argued that the King had no veto at all, the middle ground was held by people who would allow a postponing veto, while the government and the King claimed an absolute veto. Allegedly, an absolute veto was in the "spirit" of 1814 and the separation of powers principle. Those who held the first view cited the principle of popular sovereignty.

Although the veto question became central, the ministers were not out of the spotlight. Since the ministers were inferior to the King within the executive branch, the King was responsible for all actions conducted by this branch; however, the ministers were responsible for the advice given to the King when they were assembled in the Council of State. If any ministers were to dissent, according to the Constitution, they had to state this explicitly in the meeting protocol, lest they be considered in agreement and thus co-responsible. The King was above the law, but the Prime Minister and his cabinet could be tried for Impeachment for advising the King to act out an unconstitutional veto. The Impeachment Court consisted of Supreme Court Justices and elected politicians from the Lagting, and as the latter group held a two-thirds majority, an Impeachment trial with a fairly certain outcome could start as soon as the liberals won control over the Lagting seats through general elections.

=== Arenas for activism ===
Jon Hol sided with Johan Sverdrup, a liberal jurist who had become the spearhead of parliamentary opposition to the King. Hol also became involved in the workers' society Kristiania Arbeidersamfund, which was dominated by political liberals (not socialists) at that time, as a member of the board. From 1881, he worked on their publication Samfundet. This periodical eventually ceased publication, but was succeeded by Nordmanden in 1883, which Hol co-owned. Hol used Samfundet and Nordmanden as the main public arenas for his activism. He was also behind the rifle associations' member magazine Norsk Skyttertidende, which had been started in 1882 and edited by David Dietrichson for a short while before Hol took over.

=== Rifle associations and the military ===
Hol eventually came to believe that King Oscar II and his supporters, if opposed by the Norwegian Parliament, would usurp political power with the help of the Norwegian Army. Hol based this view on two speeches given by Oscar in 1882, one of them at the closing of the parliamentary session that year and hence before the 1882 general election. Harald Nicolai Storm Wergeland, the Commander at Akershus Fortress, located nearby the Norwegian Parliament, was known as a staunch conservative. In 1880, he had called for Parliament to increase the military contingent in the city. The Chief of Police supported this request; in a letter to the Ministry of Justice and the Police he stated that there was a need for preparedness regarding the political situation, as a possible pretext for "disturbances and demonstrations". Otto Nyquist, a personal friend of the King, was instated in 1882 as commander of the battalion stationed in Kristiania. In late 1883, Oscar suggested that the storage of bolts of rifles in depots around the country be disconnected, to prevent a situation in which uprising peasantry turned the Army's own weapons against them. Secret talks on a coup d'état supported by the military were held between Oscar and Christian Selmer at the Scanian castle Sofiero Palace in 1883, and the newspaper Morgenbladet publicly supported such a solution.

One of the means to counter this development, was the formation of semi-military forces. All over the country, local rifle associations had sprung up. The first rifle association—Centralforeningen for Udbredelse af Legemsøvelser og Vaabenbrug of 1861—was politically conservative, but a great number of the newer associations, especially in rural districts, supported the political liberals and radicals. They exercised as regular troops, but did not commit acts of political violence. Rather, a latent purpose was to deter a possible conflict. If conservative Commanders of the Army were to use force to subdue the parliamentary process, it was clear that rifle associations, too, could march upon Kristiania, possibly aided by "rogue" commanders such as Albert Jacobsen. Hol supported the liberal rifle associations, and helped found Kristiania Folkevæbningssamlag in his city. He also chaired Nordre Skytterlag, a local rifle association based in Nordre Aker. Apart from organizational work, he wrote several articles on the issue. In Samfundet he wrote that a "coup d'etat or attempt thereof" would lead to a popular uprising, where "real Norwegians", "soldier or non-soldier" alike would encircle the Parliament Building with "thousands of bayonets" to "await" and the political processes and guard the Constitution.

This activism was not compatible with his professional career, as he was a municipal employee. In this situation, Hol chose to formally leave the radical organizations, resigning as a member of the board of Kristiania Arbeidersamfund and Kristiania Folkevæbningssamlag. He thereby retained his job. However, in early 1884 he was fired by the municipality.

==== Rifleringen ====
In February 1884, the Impeachment trial of Prime Minister Christian Selmer and his entire cabinet was nearing its end. One of the last actions of Selmer's cabinet was to refuse to sanction a parliamentary money grant to the rifle association—the liberals had won the 1882 parliamentary election in a landslide victory—further polarizing the situation. Rumours flew that personnel of the Norwegian Army were preparing for action at Kongsvinger Fortress, some miles northeast of Kristiania.

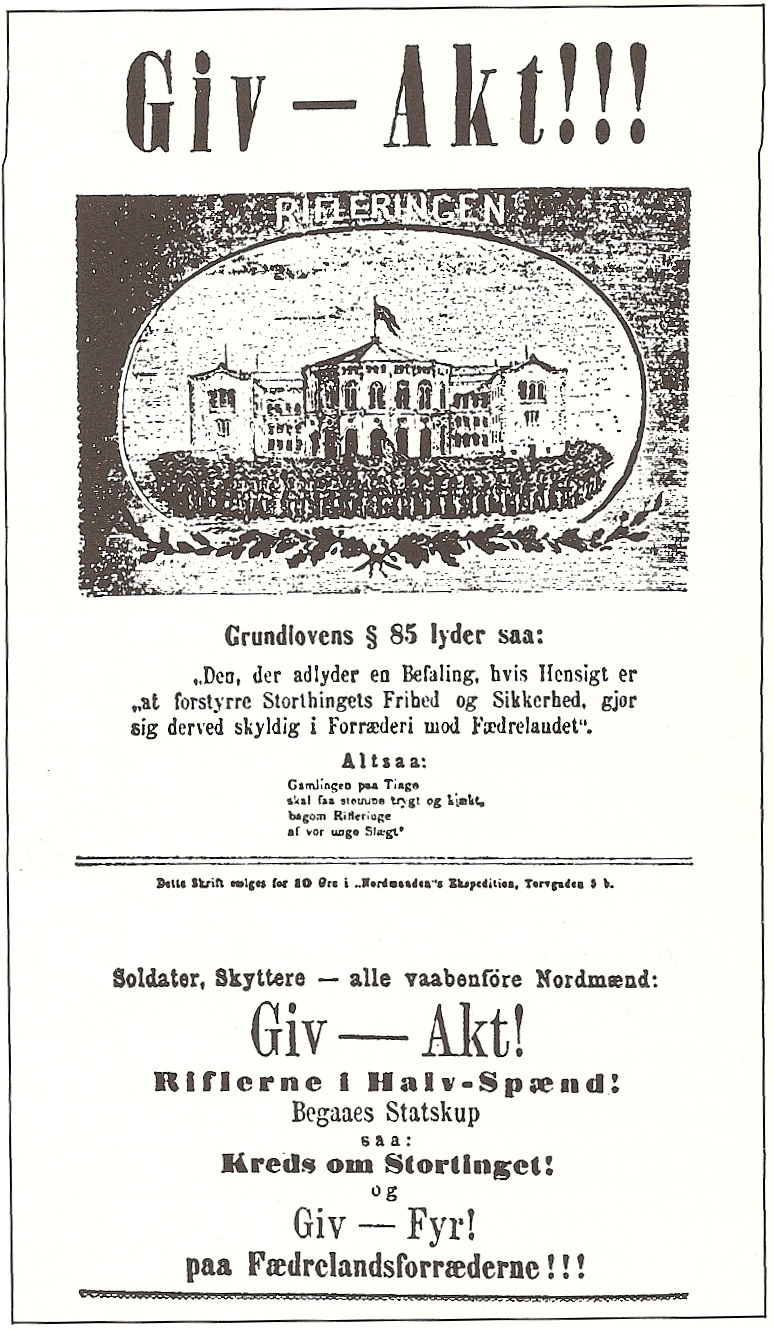
A reproduction of the pamphlet Rifleringen.

On 6 February 1884, Hol released a pamphlet which has come to be known as Rifleringen (The Rifle Ring), with the subtitle Giv Akt (At attention). Like previous writings, it called upon semi-military personnel and other weapon-able citizens to arm themselves and encircle the Parliament Building. This time, he did not call for the citizens to "await" the situation, but instead to "fire! at the traitors of the Fatherland".

The pamphlet was confiscated by the police on 8 February. The person who printed the pamphlet, Nikolai Olsen, was arrested on the same day, and the apprehension of Jon Hol followed on 10 February. He remained in custody until 26 February, and was indicted on 11 March, for lèse majesté. Bjørnstjerne Bjørnson and Lars Holst were indicted on the same charge. Upon the arrests, the newspaper Verdens Gang noted that no conservative writers had been sanctioned, despite openly calling for a coup d'état.

In the meantime, Christian Selmer was impeached on 27 February; his cabinet members followed one by one, the last being impeached on 1 April. On 11 March, Selmer resigned. Two acting Prime Ministers were drawn from his cabinet; Ole Bachke from 11 to 29 March and Niels Mathias Rye from 29 March to 3 April. Then, a new cabinet led by Selmer's former Minister of Finance Christian Homann Schweigaard was formed, but in reality it stood no chance of surviving as it faced the Liberal-dominated Parliament, whose means of pressuring the executive branch had been strengthened following the Impeachment trial. In June, as Schweigaard entered his last month as Prime Minister, the King summoned mathematics professor Ole Jacob Broch to form a compromise cabinet, but this failed owing to Conservative opposition, spearheaded by up-and-coming politician Emil Stang. Broch gave up on 22 June, and Johan Sverdrup became Prime Minister on 26 June. In light of this change in circumstances, the case against Hol had been annulled by Royal Resolution— earlier on 6 June.

=== Det norske Arbeiderforbund ===
The Conservative politicians and the King had accepted the parliamentary process without any military conflict. However, conflicts as such still existed. The country's establishment had been shocked by a number of labor conflicts, with a street battle at Kampen in 1878 and the storming of an employer's home at Etterstad in May 1880, as examples of the more volatile events. In August 1884, workers at Akers Mekaniske Verksted faced a 10% pay cut. A debate had been held in Kristiania Arbeidersamfund on 30 July, and the meeting decided to call a strike effective as of 1 August. In addition, Jon Hol took the initiative to found a national trade union center, Det norske Arbeiderforbund. Representatives from seventeen factories elected Hol as the secretary of Det norske Arbeiderforbund. The printer Nikolai Olsen became treasurer. Among the union's demands were normal working hours for laborers and universal suffrage. It staunchly opposed socialist ideas, especially through the union newspaper Arbeideren. On 7 October, a new board was elected, and the first point of their manifesto was "Law-abidingness — moral conduct — sobriety".

Det norske Arbeiderforbund was supported by people from individual factories, but the mainly philanthropic activists were associated with the Liberal Party. However, the strike at Akers Mekaniske had been a failure, as the laborers had returned to work by on 26 August—with a 10% pay cut. It soon faced competition from more worker-dominated trade unions, coordinated through the Fagforeningenes Centralkomite. On the political side, a Labour Party was formed in 1887, and from it the Norwegian Confederation of Trade Unions followed in 1899. The historical role of Det norske Arbeiderforbund, as it turned out, was to mark the transition between two kinds of trade unionism; the one dominated by the bourgeois Liberal Party and the one dominated by the socialist Labour Party. The organization became defunct around 1890. The publication Arbeideren was continued, and beginning in 1906, Arbeideren was the party organ of the newly founded Labour Democrats, a non-socialist labour and social reform party associated with the Liberal Party.

== Later life ==
Hol had been fired from his municipal job on 13 February 1884. After 1884, he laid low for a few years, but on 26 May 1886 he was given 1500 kr by the Liberal-dominated Parliament as compensation for lost income. In 1887 he was again publicly employed, assisting in the construction of the Bandak-Nordsjø Canal. He was hired as the city engineer of Skien in 1891, holding this position for almost twenty-five years, and later worked in Notodden, Kongsberg and Risør. From time to time he wrote technical articles on water pipes, among other subjects, in the magazine Teknisk Ukeblad.

He became active again in politics and the public sphere. He wrote for the liberal newspaper Dagbladet and the temperance magazine Folket, as well as for the local press. He also represented the temperance movement in the city council of Skien for twenty years. In 1906 he ran in the parliamentary elections in the constituency Skien, but was not elected. He has been called an independent candidate. At the time, however, he was denoted by Statistics Norway as loosely adhering to the Coalition Party with a leaning towards the Liberals. In the first round of voting, Hol was a "running mate" (deputy candidate) of former parliamentarian and government minister Hans Nilsen Hauge, who adhered to the Coalition Party with a conservative leaning. They faced Carl Stousland who represented the Liberal Party and P. R. Saltvik of the Labour Party. Stousland received 732 votes, Hauge 460 votes and Saltvik 231 votes. As a "running mate", Hol received 511 votes. He also got 8 votes as a primary candidate. In the second round of voting, the Coalition Party dropped Hauge and propped up Hol, who now had J. A. Larsen as his running mate. Also, the Labour Party pulled out. Hol received 595 votes, but succumbed to Stousland who got 855 votes. Hauge got 2 votes, and Hol got 23 "running mate" votes.

Hol stood for election again in the 1924 parliamentary election, when the voting system had changed completely. The constituency was now Market towns of Telemark and Aust-Agder counties, and it was a plural-member constituency where representatives were selected from the party lists with the most votes. Hol was fielded as the second candidate on the ballot of the Radical People's Party (Labour Democrats), the new name of the Labour Democrats. The first candidate was A. Jørgensen, police chief of Kragerø. The Radical People's Party fared well in Skien and Kragerø. With 1,050 votes in Kragerø the party prevailed over the Social Democrats and Communists. With 2,075 votes in Skien the party prevailed over Labour. However, it fared much worse in the other six cities, carried 4,571 votes in total and lost the election in the Market towns of Telemark and Aust-Agder counties.

Hol died in 1941, and was buried on 16 May 1941 at Vestre gravlund.
