= Finn Blakstad =

Norwegian politician (1865–1941)

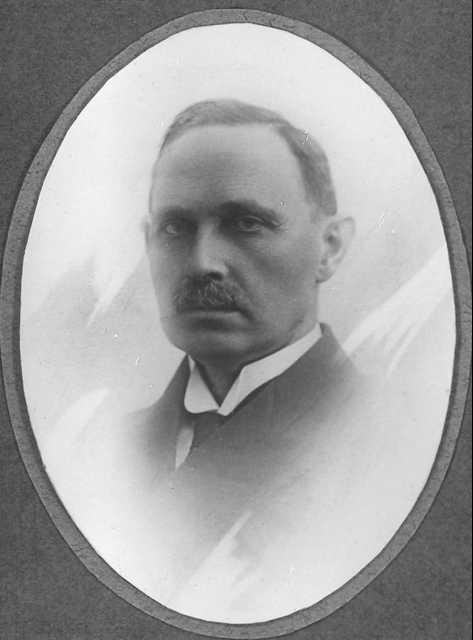
- Blakstad in 1922

Member of Parliament
- In office 1907–1915

Member of Parliament
- In office 1931–1933

Personal details
- Born: 15 January 1865 Asker, Sweden-Norway
- Died: 24 January 1941 (aged 76) Reichskommissariat Norwegen
- Party: Coalition; Conservative
- Relations: Wilhelm Blakstad (brother); Ragnvald Blakstad (brother); Gudolf Blakstad (nephew); Bernt Holtsmark (first cousin); Torger Holtsmark (first cousin)

Finn Blakstad (15 January 1865 – 24 January 1941) was a Norwegian farmer and politician for the Conservative Party.

== Personal life ==
He was born at Blakstad farm in Asker Municipality as a son of Erik Jørgensen Blakstad (1827–1890) and his wife Laura Gabrielsen (1832–1868). Finn Blakstad was also a brother of Wilhelm and Ragnvald Blakstad, a first cousin of Torger, Wilhelm and Bernt Holtsmark and an uncle of Gudolf Blakstad.

In 1890 he married Marie Johanne Fleischer (1863–1928), a daughter of Mancin Fleischer and Ulrikke Antoinette Alette Stoltenberg. They had the son Leiv Blakstad, a landowner and politician.

== Career ==
He took his education at the Higher College of Agriculture at Aas from 1883 to 1884. After working at various farms between 1884 and 1890, he bought the farm Bråstad in Øyestad Municipality in 1890 and settled as a farmer there. He was a member of Øyestad municipal council from 1895 to 1907, serving as mayor from 1901.

He was elected to the Parliament of Norway from the constituency Nedenes in 1906 and 1909. He first represented the Coalition Party, but as that party went defunct he joined the Conservative Party. In 1911 he left Øyestad and settled in Sørum Municipality. Here, he was elected to the Norwegian Parliament in 1912 and 1930.

Blakstad was a board member of the Norwegian State Railways from 1922 to 1923 and a deputy board member from 1924 to 1933. He was a member of various public boards and committees, among others the Tax Law Commission of 1929 together with Johan Henrik Christiansen, Sverre Sivertsen, Nils Hjelmtveit, Gabriel Moseid and Johan Martin J. Strand. He was also a board member of Norges Brannkasse and the Norwegian Forestry Society. He chaired the latter organization from 1938 to 1939. He died in 1941.
