= Hans Strømsæther =

Norwegian politician (1874–1937)

Hans P. R. Strømsæther (26 December 1874 – 1937) was a Norwegian bailiff and politician for the Liberal Party.

He was born at Strømsæther in the Bremesnes area of Kværnes Municipality, and finished petty officer training in Trondhjem in 1895. After a period as police officer in Kværnes Municipality from 1896, he served as bailiff of Rindal Municipality from 1900 to 1909 and Tune Municipality from 1909 to his death.

Strømsæther chaired the trade union Lensmennenes landsforening from 1920. In 1933 he published the biographical dictionary Norges lensmenn. He had become active in politics and municipal administration, and served as municipal treasurer of Bremsnes. In Rindalen he held "nearly all the municipal posts eligible with his position as bailiff". While living in Tune he was involved in local banking, among others as a deputy board member of the local Bank of Norway branch in Fredrikstad. He represented the Liberal Party.

He was also fielded as the party candidate in parliamentary elections. In the 1912 Norwegian parliamentary election, he was fielded as Liberal's alternative to Labour's Albert Theodor Alexius Moeskau and Conservative Gunnerius Furuholmen. However, Strømsæther lost both the first and second round; as well as the new second round after the previous one was annulled. In 1915, Strømsæther briefly fielded for the Totallers' Party, but ended fourth and last in the first round. He was later the Liberals' third ballot candidate in 1921, fourth ballot candidate in 1924, first candidate in 1930, 1933 and 1936 without being elected.

He was decorated with the King's Medal of Merit in gold in 1925. He died in the summer of 1937.
