= Bernt Holtsmark =

Norwegian politician (1859–1941)

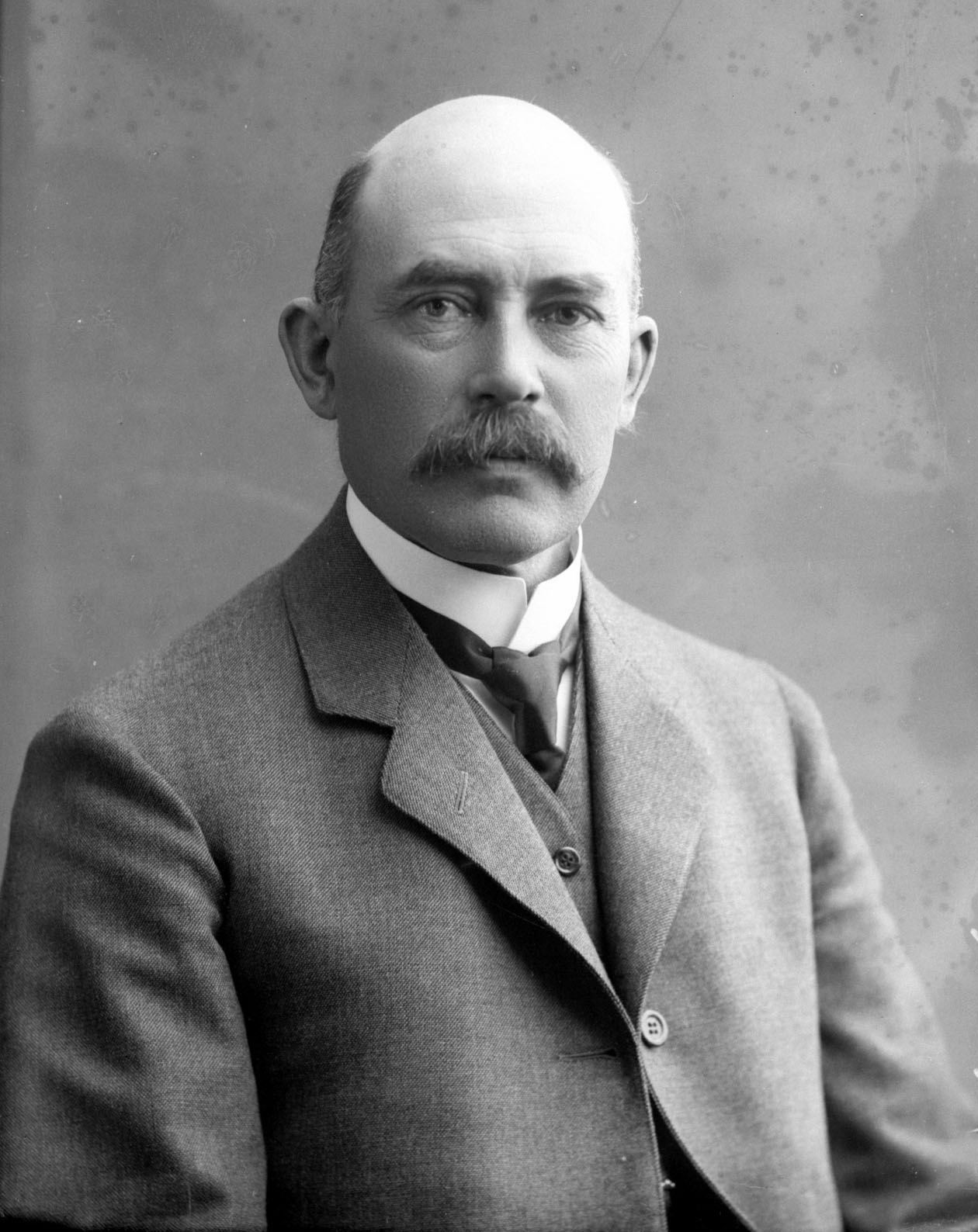

Minister of Agriculture
- In office 1 March 1910 – 20 February 1912
- Prime Minister: Wollert Konow
- Preceded by: Wollert Konow
- Succeeded by: Erik Enge

Member of the Norwegian Parliament
- In office 1 January 1916 – 31 December 1921
- Constituency: Centre Romerike
- In office 1 January 1907 – 31 December 1909
- Constituency: Bærum and Follo
- In office 1 January 1904 – 31 December 1906
- Constituency: Akershus

Personal details
- Born: 27 December 1859 Asker, Akershus, United Kingdoms of Sweden and Norway
- Died: 20 April 1941 (aged 81)
- Party: Conservative; Coalition; Free-minded Liberal
- Spouse(s): Mathilde Bye (m. 1919); Johanne Koller (1887–1917)
- Relations: Bent Holtsmark (father); Torger Holtsmark (brother); Gabriel Gabrielsen Holtsmark (brother); Johan Peter Holtsmark (nephew); Anne Elisabeth Holtsmark (niece); Karen Holtsmark (niece); Finn Blakstad (first cousin); Wilhelm Blakstad (first cousin); Ragnvald Blakstad (first cousin)
- Children: Henriette von der Recke Holtsmark; Torger Holtsmark

Bernt Holtsmark (27 December 1859 – 20 April 1941) was a Norwegian farmer and politician for the Conservative Party and the Liberal Left Party. He was a four-term member of the Parliament of Norway, and served as Minister of Agriculture from 1910 to 1912. He was also known for establishing the agricultural college at Sem in his native Asker.

== Personal life ==
He was born at Tveter farm in Asker as a son of Bent Holtsmark and his wife Anne Elisabeth Gabrielsen. He was a brother of Torger and Wilhelm Holtsmark. Through his brother Gabriel, he was an uncle of professors Johan Peter Holtsmark and Anne Elisabeth Holtsmark, and painter Karen Holtsmark. He was also a first cousin of Finn, Wilhelm. and Ragnvald Blakstad.

In October 1887 he married Johanne Amalie Koller, a daughter of Carl Theodor Fredrik Koller. The marriage lasted until her death in February 1917. Holtsmark then married Ingeborg Mathilde Bye in June 1919.

== Career ==
He attended a private agricultural school at Østensjø from 1876 to 1878, the Higher College of Agriculture at Aas from 1883 to 1884 and the Landwirtschaftliche Hochschule Berlin (Agricultural University of Berlin) from 1885 to 1886. In 1887, together with his brother Wilhelm, he established an agricultural college at the farm Sem, today known as a manor which in 2001 lent its name to the Declaration of Sem of the second cabinet Bondevik. They ran the college until 1914. In 1893 he took over the farm Tveter, and was a farmer there. His book Husdyrlære, a textbook on livestock, came in 1897 and was reprinted fourteen times, last in 1961. Also, he contributed to the newspapers and magazines Budstikken, Dagbladet, Verdens Gang, Tidens Tegn and Allers with writings on agriculture.

He was elected to the Parliament of Norway from the constituency Akershus Amt in 1903, and was re-elected in 1906. He first represented the Conservative Party, and in the second term he was registered for the Coalition Party. On 1 March 1910, he was appointed as the new Minister of Agriculture in the cabinet Konow, succeeding Wollert Konow (SB) in the position. He held office until the cabinet fell in February 1912. He was later re-elected in 1915 and 1918 to serve a further two parliamentary terms, this time for the Liberal Left Party.

He was a chairman of the Liberal Left Party for a period. He was also a chairman of the Norwegian Fire Protection Association, and a member of the board of Norsk Husflidsforening, Norsk Landmandsforbund, the Royal Norwegian Society of Development from 1898 to 1907 and 1919 to 1931, and Havedyrkningens Venner from 1916 to 1935. He received honorary membership in the two latter organizations. From 1927 to 1936 he worked as director and chair of Norges Hypotekbank, and he was also a member of several public boards, agencies and committees. He was decorated as a Commander of the Royal Norwegian Order of St. Olav in 1912.

Political offices
Preceded by Wollert Konow (SB)	Norwegian Minister of Agriculture; 1910–1912	Succeeded by Erik Mathiassen Enge
