= Nils M. Kulstad =

Norwegian politician

Nils Jørgen August Mikalsen Kulstad (15 January 1866 – 17 December 1947) was a Norwegian farmer, savings bank director and politician for the Liberal Party.

He was born at Kulstad in Vefsn Municipality as a son of farmers, Michal Nasen Kulstad (1833–1887) and Oline Marie Olsdatter (1843–1869). He was a grandson of politician Nils I. Kulstad. He attended school until 1882, and started working at the family farm which he took over in 1887. Between 1881 and 1897 he spent the winters fishing outside of Lofoten. After serving as board member since 1893, Kulstad was also hired as treasurer of the local savings bank Vefsn Sparebank in 1904. Between 1924 and 1936 he was the bank's chief executive.

He served as a member of the municipal council of Vefsn Municipality for several terms, last in 1928. He served as mayor in 1895, 1896, 1902, 1903 and 1904. He also chaired the school board and served as public trustee. In the parliamentary elections of 1900 and 1903 he served as an elector. He was later elected to the Parliament of Norway from Nordre Helgeland in 1909, 1912 and 1918 and (after a constituency reform) from Nordland in 1921. He did not field in the 1915 election.

From 1920 to 1929 he was a deputy board member of the Norwegian Water Resources and Energy Directorate. He died in December 1947.
