= 1928 Norwegian local elections =

== Result of municipal elections ==
Results of the 1928 municipal elections.

Party	Votes	%
Labour Party		36.4
Conservative Party–Free-minded Liberal Party		14.2
Liberal Party–Radical People's Party		10.0
Farmers' Party		8.4
Communist Party		3.5
Joint lists and others		27.5
Total		

=== National daily newspapers ===
Newspaper	Party endorsed	Notes
Sunnmørsposten	Liberal Party	
Bergens Arbeiderblad	Labour Party	
Aftenposten	Conservative Party	Stem norsk stem høire
