= 1937 Norwegian local elections =

== Result of municipal elections ==
Results of the 1937 municipal elections.

Party	Votes	%	Seats
Labour Party	522,173	43.39	5,702
Conservative Party	158,275	13.15	798
Liberal Party	120,649	10.03	1,456
Farmers' Party	82,016	6.82	1,426
Communist Party	19,742	1.64	128
Christian Democratic Party	18,417	1.53	115
Free-minded People's Party	7,732	0.64	19
Radical People's Party	3,150	0.26	36
Nasjonal Samling	1,422	0.12	7
Joint lists and others	269,754	22.42	4,780
Total	1,203,330	100.00	14,467
Registered voters/turnout	1,723,621	–	

=== National daily newspapers ===
Newspaper	Party endorsed	Notes
Arbeidet	Communist Party of Norway	
