= 1934 Norwegian local elections =

== Result of municipal elections ==
Results of the 1934 municipal elections.

| Party | Votes | % |
|---|---|---|
| Labour Party | | 40.9 |
| Conservative Party–Free-minded People's Party | | 12.1 |
| Liberal Party–Radical People's Party | | 11.6 |
| Farmers' Party | | 7.1 |
| Communist Party | | 2.4 |
| Nasjonal Samling | | 1.5 |
| Christian Democratic Party | | 1.0 |
| Joint lists and others | | 23.4 |
| Total | | |

=== National daily newspapers ===
| Newspaper | Party endorsed | Notes |
|---|---|---|
| Vestmar | Liberal Party | |
