= Oluf Christian Müller =

Norwegian politician

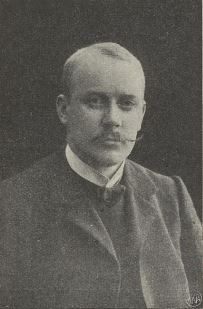

Oluf Christian Müller (19 October 1876 – 7 January 1938) was a Norwegian businessperson and politician for the Liberal Left Party.

He was born in Sunndalen Municipality as a son of vicar Christian Høy Müller (1834–1882) and Mathea Herlofine Herlofsen (1847–1905). He attended middle school in Kristiansund, and stayed briefly in Kristiania, Germany and England. He started working in the company of his maternal grandfather in 1896, before taking over as manager at Goma Smørfabrik in 1900. Having expanded in 1934 to produce soap as well (Goma Margarin- og Saapefabrik), he remained manager until his death.

He was a member of the municipal council for Kristiansund Municipality from 1910 to 1913, 1919 to 1925, 1928 to 1931 and 1934 to 1937. He was elected to the Parliament of Norway in 1918 from the urban constituency Kristiansund, and was re-elected in 1921 from the Market towns of Møre og Romsdal county. From 1923 to 1924 he was Vice President of the Storting. He later served as a deputy representative during the term 1925–1927. He became deputy chairman of the Liberal Left Party in 1921, and chaired the party from 1922 to 1924. He was then a central board member until 1925.

He chaired the board of Kristiansund Elektrisitetsverk and Uldvarefabriken Fosna, and was also a supervisory committee member of the Rauma Line from 1932 to 1934, supervisory council member of Norges Brannkasse from 1928 to 1934.
