= Albert Theodor Alexius Moeskau =

Norwegian politician (1864–1929)

Albert Theodor Alexius Moeskau (27 September 1864 – 18 August 1929) was a Norwegian laborer and politician for the Labour and Social Democratic Labour parties. He served as a member of the municipal council for Tune Municipality and also as a member of the Parliament of Norway in 1913–1915, later deputy member from 1922–1924.

== Early life and political career ==
He was born at Ihleeie in Stange Municipality as a son of crofter Anders Johannesen Moeskau and Tolline Andreasdatter. His father later started as a laborer at Hamar Melkefabrik, and after Moeskau had spent his adolescence at sea, from 1882 to 1889, he too was hired at Hamar Melkefabrik. In 1891 he moved to work at Sannesund Melkefabrik in Tune.

Moeskau chaired the Labour Party branch in Smaalenenes Amt from 1904 to 1908, and was also a central board member of the Labour Party from 1906. He was elected to the executive committee of the municipal council of Tune Municipality in 1907.

He was also fielded as the party candidate in parliamentary elections. In the 1906 Norwegian parliamentary election, Tune was a new constituency. Moeskau carried 426 votes in the first round, but lost. In the second round, Labour generally backed the Liberal candidate to avoid the Coalition candidate; as a result Moeskau received only 7 votes in this round. However, in 1909, Moeskau won the first round with 1,045 votes, prevailing over four other candidates. It was not enough to win a parliamentary seat, and in the second round, the conservative parties cooperated against him, with a compromise candidate Gunnerius Furuholmen edging out Moeskau by 2,477 against 1,494 votes (Liberal candidate Johan M. Schie also carried 861 votes).

== Parliament and later career ==
In the 1912 Norwegian parliamentary election he was elected to the Parliament of Norway and served through one term. In the first round of voting Moeskau had again achieved a plurality, with 1,640 votes against Furuholmen's 1,516 and Liberal Hans Strømsæther's 1,370. In the second round, then, Moeskau narrowly edged out Furuholmen with 2,081 against 2,079 votes with Strømsæther also carrying 1,876. When Parliament found irregularities in the Tune vote in January 1913, and cancelled the second round, a new round was held in which Moeskau prevailed over the two others with 2,247—2,030—1,537. His deputy was J. O. Thue. Moeskau was a member of the Standing Committee on Customs.

In 1915, Moeskau faced Furuholmen's former deputy MP Kristian Edvart Jahren, whose brother was already a six-term MP from Rygge constituency. As in the two previous elections, Moeskau won the first round with 2,303 votes and Jahren trailing in second with 1,621. In the second round, the liberal vote spread across Labour and Conservative, with Jahren gathering 3,620 votes against Moeskau's 3,011 and winning the seat. In 1918, Moeskau again won the first round, over Jahren, Strømsæther and the Agrarian candidate Peter Hjalmar Finnestad in a distant fourth place. In the second round, however, the Liberal Party fielded Finnestad as their candidate while the Conservatives pulled Jahren from the race. Finnestad subsequently beat Moeskau with 3,813 against 2,544 votes.

Moeskau would later join the new party Social Democratic Labour Party of Norway, which split from Labour in 1921. He was the third ballot candidate for the party in the 1921 election. The election was successful as he became first deputy for the pair Johannes Bergersen and Peter Olai Thorvik.

The road Albert Moeskaus vei has been named after him in Sarpsborg
