= Johan Samuelsen =

Norwegian politician

Johan Samuelsen (29 April 1882 – 28 May 1943) was a Norwegian shoemaker, trade unionist and politician for the Labour Party and Social Democratic Labour parties.

He was born at Mulen in Naustdal Municipality as a son of farmers, but moved to Bergen and took shoemaker's training from 1898 to 1901. He joined the trade union in 1903. He worked as a shoemaker until 1918, then as a secretary in the local trade union information office. From 1920 to his death he was an office clerk in the people's register of Bergen.

He chaired Bergen Labour Party from 1911 to 1913. He was a member of Bergen city council from 1910 to 1919, 1922 to 1925 and 1928 to 1937. He was elected to the Parliament of Norway from the constituency Kalfaret in 1912 and Nygaard in 1915. In 1921 he joined the new Social Democratic Labour Party, and headed their ballot in Bergen in the 1921 and 1924 election. He was not elected. In 1927, however, he rejoined the Labour Party as the two parties merged, and was elected to Parliament in 1927, 1930, 1933 and 1936.

He was a member of the Luxury Tax Commission of 1917, Labourer Commission of 1918 and the Wage Commission of 1919. He was a board member of Bergens Lysverker from 1919 to 1932, supervisory council of Bergens Privatbank from 1932 and a deputy auditor in the Office of the Auditor General of Norway.
