= Gabriel Gabrielsen Holtsmark =

Norwegian actuary and physicist

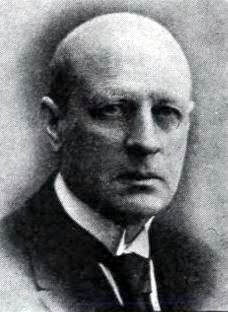
Gabriel Gabrielsen Holtsmark

Gabriel Gabrielsen Holtsmark (1 February 1867 – 20 July 1954) was a Norwegian educator, physicist and actuary.

== Personal life ==
He was born in Asker as a son of farmer and mayor Bent Holtsmark and his wife Anne Elisabeth Gabrielsen. He was a brother of Bernt, Torger and Wilhelm Holtsmark. Both Bernt and Torger were members of the Parliament of Norway.

In April 1893 in Kristiania he married Margrete Weisse, and through her he was a son-in-law of professor Johan Peter Weisse. He had two sons and three daughters; Johan Peter Holtsmark and Anne Holtsmark became professors and Karen Holtsmark became a notable painter. A third daughter Marie eventually took over the family farm Holtsmark in Lier, as former owner Torger Holtsmark had no children.

== Career ==
He finished his secondary education in 1885, and took the teacher's education in 1892. He worked as a teacher from 1889 to 1901, and wrote several textbooks: Lærebog i fysik in 1898, Naturlære for middelskolen in 1905 with Daniel Isaachsen, and Lærebog i fysik for realgymnasiet og tekniske skoler in 1909. From 1899 to 1901 he edited the education periodical Den høiere skole. From 1901 to 1902 he spent time at the University of Würzburg, studying under Wilhelm Wien. In 1902 Holtsmark delivered his doctoral thesis, which bore the name Eine Methode für die Intensitätsmessung von Röntgenstrahlen nebst einer Berechnung der Wellenlänge derselben. He returned to Norway the same year, and was hired at the Norwegian College of Agriculture.

From 1910 he was an actuary in the insurance company Livsforsikringsselskapet Fram. In 1920 he became the director of the business secondary school Kristiania Commerce School. From 1920 to 1923 he was also a member of the National Price Council. He died in 1954.
