= Bent Holtsmark =

Norwegian agriculturalist and politician

Bent Holtsmark (1823–1903) was a Norwegian agriculturalist and politician.

He was born in Lier, but moved to Asker in 1849. He was a farmer at Tveter farm, and also owned the farms Berg, Vøien and Sem. He was decorated with the King Oscar II Medal for his work in agriculture, and was also mayor of Asker from 1869 to 1875. He was an elector for the Conservative Party in the 1888 Norwegian parliamentary election.

His sons Bernt Holtsmark and Wilhelm Holtsmark established an agricultural college at Sem, today known as a manor which lent its name to the Declaration of Sem of the Bondevik's Second Cabinet. Bernt Holtsmark was also a Minister of Agriculture. A third son Torger Holtsmark moved back to Lier, and became mayor there. A fourth son Gabriel Gabrielsen Holtsmark became a physicist, and through him Bent was grandfather of Johan, Anne and Karen Holtsmark.
