= Asbjørn Balthazar Syrrist =

Norwegian politician

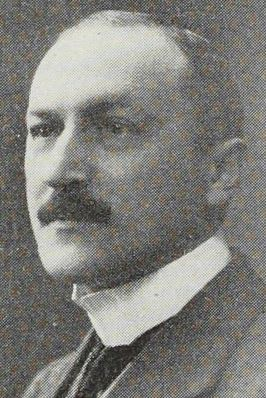
Asbjørn Syrrist

Asbjørn Balthazar Syrrist (19 October 1874 – 1953) was a Norwegian jurist, newspaper editor and politician for the Conservative Party.

He was born in Horten. He finished his secondary education at Aars og Voss in 1891, became an officer at the Norwegian Military Academy in 1893 and took the cand.jur. degree at the Royal Frederick University in 1906. After starting his career as a teacher from 1894 to 1897 in Horten, he became editor-in-chief of Søndmør Folketidende in 1898, then of Tønsbergs Blad in 1899.

In Tønsberg he was also a police superintendent from 1918 to 1925 as well as attorney. He was an elected member of the municipal council of Tønsberg Municipality from 1908 to 1913, and in the 1912 Norwegian parliamentary election he was elected from Tønsberg to serve one term in the Parliament of Norway (until 1915). He was also the second secretary in the Conservative Party central board from 1897 to 1898.

He was married and had one daughter. He died in 1953.
