= Arbeideren (Labour Democrats) =

Norwegian newspaper

Arbeideren ("The Worker") was a Norwegian newspaper, published in Oslo from 1884 to 1917.

Arbeideren was started in 1884 as an organ for the bourgeois trade union center Det norske Arbeiderforbund. It changed its name to Arbeiderstandens Fellesorgan ("Common Organ of the Worker Estate") in 1889. From 1906 until it went defunct in 1917, Arbeideren was the main organ of the newly established Labour Democrats with C. W. Asp as editor-in-chief.
