= Emil Schreiner =

Norwegian philologist

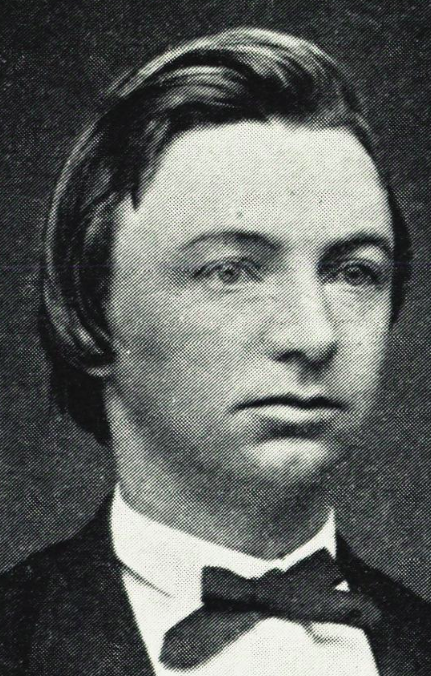
Emil Schreiner.

Emil Theodor Schreiner (26 November 1831 – 15 November 1910) was a Norwegian philologist and educator.

== Biography ==
Schreiner was born in Christiania (now called Oslo) in 1831. He was the son of merchant Peter Heinrich Schreiner (1794–1880) and Andrea Wiborg (1801–1882). His father migrated to Norway from Flensburg.

Schreiner took his examen artium at Christiania Cathedral School in 1849, and graduated from the Royal Frederick University with the cand.philol. degree in 1855. He studied in Berlin for one year and also worked as a teacher of the secondary school Nissens Latin- og Realskole.

Schneiner started his own school in 1859, but sold it in 1862 to work for a year as a research fellow at the university. He wrote his only academic paper, Om Forholdet mellom rythmus og metrum, but it was not published until 1866, when Schreiner had returned to the school system. Schreiner worked at Christiania Cathedral School from 1863 to 1872. From 1870, he was acting principal while Frederik Ludvig Vibe was ill.

In 1872, Schreiner was made the principal at Skien Latinskole a post he held until 1876. He was at Drammen Latinskole from 1877 to 1893 and Kristiania Cathedral School (the school had changed spelling) from 1894 to 1907.

Schreiner wrote several textbooks for the school system. Latinsk Sproglære til Skolebrug was released in 1871, and issued in the third edition in 1885. It faced competition in its time from Johan Peter Weisse's grammar Latinsk Grammatik til Skolebrug, also released in 1871, but Weisse's book was considered too difficult for school students, and was outsold by Schreiner's book. Schreiner's Latinsk Vocabularium til Skolebrug was released in 1880, and issued in the sixth edition in 1936. Kortfattet latinsk Ordføiningslære til Brug i Middelskolen only came in one edition, in 1881. In 1887, Schreiner published the Latin-Norwegian dictionary Latinsk Ordbog together with Jan Johanssen and Marius Nygaard, a book which is still in use—it has been updated and reissued, last in 1998.

Schreiner was a Commander, Second Class of the Royal Norwegian Order of St. Olav. Despite having only worked one year at a university, as research fellow, Schreiner was also made a member of the Norwegian Academy of Science and Letters from 1887. He was also invited to sit on the assessment committee for professor candidates at the university. In December 1875, he was a part of the majority of the committee which appointed Johan Peter Weisse as professor, in preference to Jan Johanssen.

Schreiner married his cousin Gunhild Heiberg Wiborg (1848–1932) in November 1872, and he was the brother-in-law of Sophus Bugge. Another of his cousins was the father of Kristian Schreiner. Emil Schreiner died in November 1910 in Kristiania.
