= Johan Austeen =

Norwegian school director and politician

Johan Gustav Austeen (21 August 1863 – 17 November 1932) was a Norwegian school director and politician for the Liberal and Liberal Left parties.

== Early life ==
He was born at Vestre Brekke in Brunlanes Municipality as a son of farmers. After basic school he enrolled at the Norwegian College of Agriculture in 1887, graduating in 1890. He worked at this college until 1895, when he was hired as managing director of Sem agricultural school.

== Career ==
Austeen served as a member of the municipal council of Sem Municipality from 1904 to 1907. He was then elected to the Parliament of Norway from the single-member constituency Sandeherred in 1906 and 1909. In 1906, he fielded on a Liberal Party ticket with Ragnvald Berg as running mate, though Austeen also pledged to the Coalition Party. Austeen and Berg barely managed to carry over 50% of the vote, eliminating the need for a run-off election. In 1909, Austeen had joined the new Liberal Left Party and ran on a joint ticket of the Conservative and Liberal Left parties, though his running mate Gullik Nilssen-Kamfjord also belonged to the Liberal Left Party. Again, they carried their constituency in the first round. Austeen was a member of the Standing Committee on Justice in his first term and the Standing Committee on Agriculture in his second term. Having settled in Stokke Municipality, he served as mayor there from 1914 to 1919.

Austeen also chaired Vestfold Forestry Society from 1905 to 1907, and became a board member of the Royal Norwegian Society for Development in 1918. In 1921, he resigned from Sem agricultural school and became director of service at the Norwegian College of Agriculture, where he stayed until retiring in 1929. He died in November 1932 at the Red Cross Clinic in Oslo.
