= Karen Holtsmark =

Norwegian artist (1907–1998)

Karen Kristine Holtsmark (11 November 1907 – 7 March 1998) was a Norwegian painter.

== Biography ==
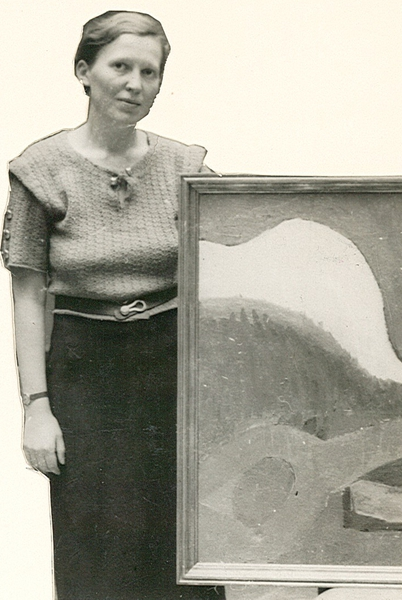
Karen Holtsmark, c. 1938

Holtsmark was born at Ås in Akershus, Norway. She was a daughter of Gabriel Gabrielsen Holtsmark (1867–1954) and his wife Margrete Weisse (1871–1933). Her father was a physicist, and her mother was an educator. She was a maternal granddaughter of philologist Johan Peter Weisse, and a paternal granddaughter of agriculturalist and politician Bent Holtsmark. She was a niece of politicians Bernt and Torger Holtsmark, and a sister of professors Johan and Anne Holtsmark. She married Haakon R. Brækken in July 1936, but the marriage was dissolved.

== Career ==
Holtsmark attended the Norwegian National Academy of Craft and Art Industry from 1924 to 1927 and the Norwegian National Academy of Fine Arts from 1927 to 1930. Her most important teacher was Axel Revold, and she was also influenced by Vilhelm Bjerke-Petersen to take up the Surrealist style. Some of her paintings were Expressionist. She also became a Communist and stayed several times in France, where she also studied under Georg Jacobsen in 1936.

Karen Holtsmark

In 1932 Holtsmark participated in a group exhibition at the Kunstnerforbundet in Oslo with Bjarne Rise, Johannes Rian and Vilhelm Bjerke-Petersen. She had her first exhibit at Kunstnerforbundet in 1935 and had major exhibits in Copenhagen in 1935 and in Lund, Sweden in 1937. In 1959 she was one of the winners of a contest to be displayed in the Parliament of Norway. Her work Solens gang was woven by Else Halling between 1959 and 1965 and was displayed in the Central Hall.

Some of her works, especially the main work, Mennesket og vilkårene (1935), were controversial, and it was not bought by the National Gallery of Norway until 1993. The National Gallery now holds twelve of her landscape paintings. Her art is also on display at Lillehammer Art Museum and Bergen Billedgalleri.

Holtsmark retired in 1970 because of an eye condition. She died in March 1998 in Ås.
