= Anne Holtsmark =

Norwegian professor of Old Norse studies

Anne Elisabeth Holtsmark (21 June 1896 – 19 May 1974) was a Norwegian philologist.

== Personal life ==
She was born in Kristiania, the second of five children of Gabriel Gabrielsen Holtsmark (1867–1954) and Margrete Weisse (1871–1933), and grew up in Kristiania and Ås. She was a maternal granddaughter of Johan Peter Weisse, a paternal granddaughter of Bent Holtsmark, a niece of Bernt and Torger Holtsmark, and a sister of Johan and Karen Holtsmark. She herself never married.

== Career ==
Holtsmark was educated in business schools and worked at the Christiania Sparebank from 1913 to 1915 before taking the examen artium at Kristiania Cathedral School in 1917. In 1927, she graduated from the Royal Frederick University with a cand.philol. degree in 1924. She majored in Norwegian and minored in French and history, and also worked part-time as a tutor and keeping accounts at the Oslo Commerce School, where her father was the director.

Holtsmark became the first female professor in Old Norse at the University of Oslo. She worked at the University Library of Oslo until 1930, except for 1925–26, when she was a docent in Norwegian at the University of Hamburg for a year. In 1931 she was hired as a docent in Norse philology at the university. She took the dr.philos. degree in 1936 with the thesis En islandsk scholasticus fra det 12. århundre, and in 1949 was promoted to professor, succeeding Magnus Olsen.

She had to retire in 1960 because of multiple sclerosis, which confined her to a wheelchair from the 1950s onwards. She died in Oslo in May 1974.

== Publications ==
Holtsmark published several translations from Old Norse into Norwegian: Heimskringla (with Didrik Arup Seip, two volumes, 1934); the Prose Edda (1950); Helgisaga Óláfs konungs Haraldssonar (1956); Sverris saga (1961), Hákonar saga Hákonarsonar (1964); and Orkneyinga saga (1970). She wrote her master's thesis on the Glymdrápa, and also published on the Haustlöng. From 1938 to 1949 she led the Old Norse dictionary project Gammelnorsk ordboksverk.

She published numerous articles, including many contributions to the Kulturhistorisk leksikon for nordisk middelalder. Her book on Norse mythology, Norrøn mytologi: Tru og mytar i vikingtida (1970) was republished and translated several times.

== Honours ==
- Member of the Norwegian Academy of Science and Letters (from 1941)
- Royal Norwegian Order of St. Olav (Knight 1st Class) (1958)
- Honorary doctorate from the University of Iceland (1961)
