= Ragnvald Blakstad =

Norwegian industrialist and hydropower pioneer (1866–1929)

- Born: 20 May 1866; Asker Municipality, Norway
- Died: 26 April 1929 (aged 62)
- Occupation: Industrialist
- Known for: Tyssedal Hydroelectric Power Station; Aura Hydroelectric Power Station
- Relatives: Finn Blakstad (brother); Wilhelm Blakstad (brother)

Ragnvald Blakstad (20 May 1866 – 26 April 1929) was a Norwegian industrialist and hydropower pioneer. He is best known for developing hydropower in the Arendal watershed, and for the Tyssedal Hydroelectric Power Station and Aura Hydroelectric Power Station.

== Biography ==
Blakstad was born at Asker Municipality in Akershus, Norway. He was born to Erik Jørgensen Blakstad (1827–90) and Larine (Laura) Gabrielsen (1832–68). He was a brother of both Finn Blakstad and Wilhelm Blakstad as well as an uncle of Gudolf Blakstad. Their father, together with Ole H. Holta (1851–1928), had started the lumber company, Blakstad, Holta & Co, in Skien.

Blakstad moved to Arendal in 1888 and started first with the exports of lumber. In 1896, he co-founded the power company AS Barbu, when he had received a license to produce electricity in Barbu river. He subsequently bought numerous other waterfalls in along the Arendal watercourse. In 1897 bought Blakstad Eivindstadfossen in Froland Municipality. In 1910, he acquired the majority of shares in the Tyssedal Hydroelectric Power Station (AS Tyssefaldene) and became director general of the company. In 1913 he acquired the majority in Aura Hydroelectric Power Station (Aura kraftverk). In these endeavors, he had to raise capital for acquisitions from outside parties including members of the Wallenberg family of Sweden including Marcus Wallenberg, Sr., founder of Stockholms Enskilda Bank.

After the end of World War I his operations were hit by the post-war depression. The markets failed and he had to sell off much of his investments. In 1917, he co-founded The Norwegian Iron Works (De Norske Jernverker A/S), and followed up with plans for a steel and rolling mills in Risør. In 1919, this property formed the basis of the Aust-Agder power stations (Aust-Agder Kraftverk).

== Personal life ==
In 1890, he married Margarethe Jensen (1866–1938).
