= Gunnerius Furuholmen =

Norwegian politician

Gunnerius Furuholmen (12 January 1861 – 23 August 1947) was a Norwegian engineer and politician for the Conservative Party.

He was born at Furuholmen in Varteig as a son of timber rafting inspector and politician Richard Christensen Furuholmen (1840–1899) and Oleane Røstad (1835–1913). He was an uncle of engineer Thor Furuholmen.

He graduated as an engineer from Trondhjem Technical School in 1881. From 1885 he was a floating inspector at Furuholmen, later at Hvidsten. He worked together with his father, and together they managed to improve floating conditions in Nedre Glommen region. From 1909 he worked at the timber floating office in Fredrikstad.

Furuholmen was an elected municipal council member in Varteig and later Tune, most notably serving as mayor of Varteig from 1898 to 1899. He was also a board member of the local savings bank. In the 1909 Norwegian parliamentary election he was fielded as the Conservative Party deputy candidate; as running mate of Knut Edvart Jahren in the single-member constituency Tune. In the first round of voting, Jahren and Furuholmen lost to Labour candidate Albert Theodor Alexius Moeskau with 884 against 1,045 votes—but came ahead of three other candidates. In the subsequent run-off vote, the Church Party coupled with the Conservatives to field Furuholmen as candidate with Jahren as deputy. Furuholmen received 2,477 votes, edging out Moeskau's 1,494 votes. Furuholmen served one term in the Parliament of Norway as a member of the Standing Committee on Church Affairs. In 1912, Furuholmen received re-nomination and was backed by the Liberal Left Party in addition. However, he lost to Moeskau in both the first and second round, and his parliamentary career was over.

He died in 1947 and was buried in Varteig.
