= Henrik Spangelo =

Norwegian politician

Henrik Roardsen Spangelo (1858–1926) was a Norwegian politician for the Conservative Party and later the Liberal Left Party.

A jurist by education, he worked as a civil servant in Grimstad and Arendal. At the same time he speculated in estate in his native Aardal Municipality, such as the Tyin waterfall near Øvre Årdal.

He served as a deputy representative to the Norwegian Parliament from the constituency Arendal og Grimstad during the terms 1906–1909 and 1910–1912. He then served as a regular representative during the terms 1913–1915, 1919–1921 and 1922–1924. From 1919 to 1924 he was President of the Odelsting.
