= Magnus Halvorsen =

Norwegian politician (1853–1922)

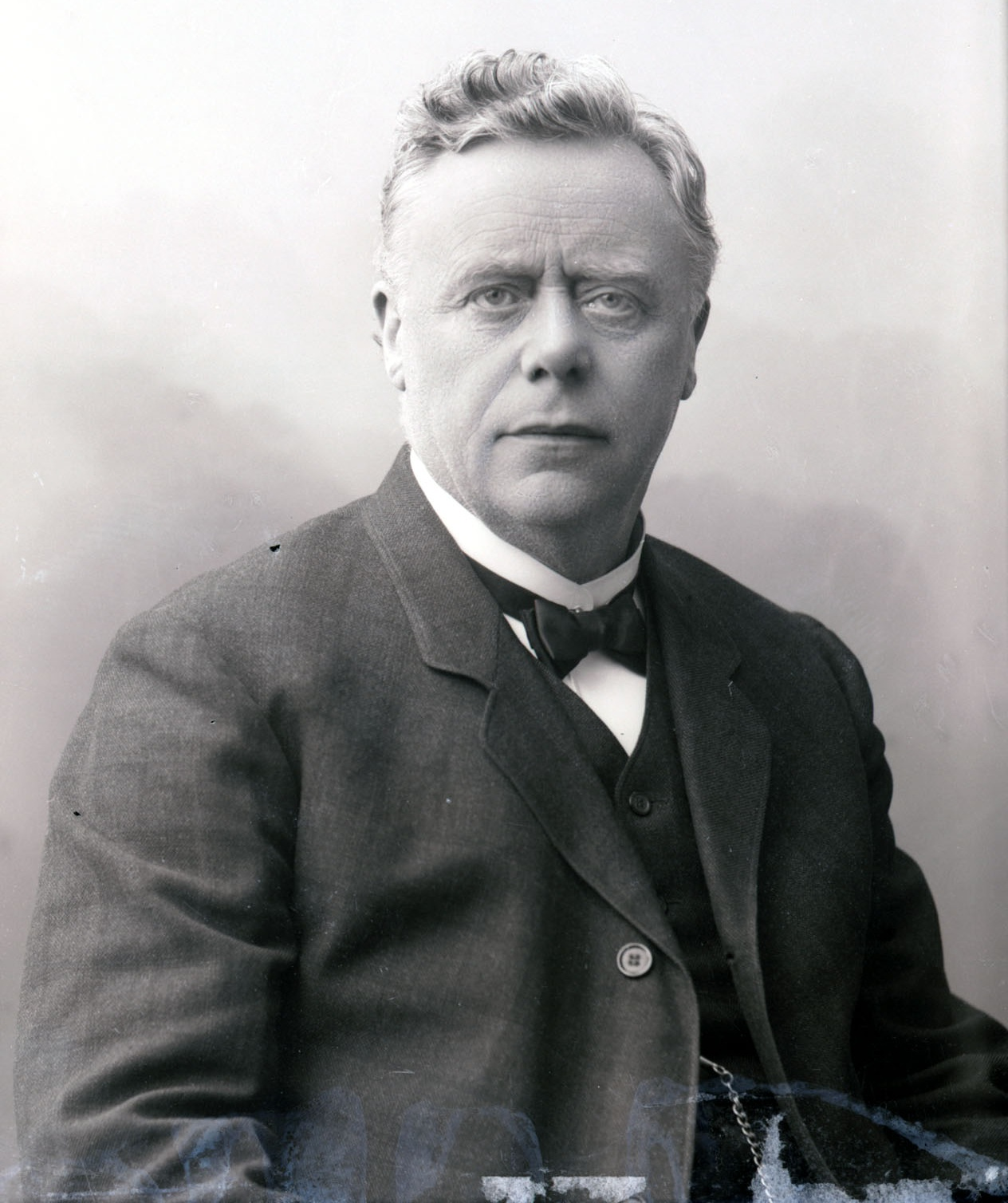

President of the Storting
- In office 1 January 1910 – 31 December 1912 Serving with Wollert Konow and Jens Bratlie
- Monarch: Haakon VII
- Prime Minister: Gunnar Knudsen; Wollert Konow; Jens Bratlie
- Preceded by: Edvard Liljedahl; Gunnar Knudsen; Carl Berner
- Succeeded by: Jørgen Løvland; Søren Tobias Årstad; Gunnar Knudsen

Minister of Finance
- In office 23 October 1907 – 19 March 1908
- Prime Minister: Jørgen Løvland
- Preceded by: Abraham Berge
- Succeeded by: Gunnar Knudsen

Member of the Norwegian Parliament
- In office 1 January 1910 – 31 December 1912
- Constituency: Bakklandet
- In office 1 January 1907 – 31 December 1909
- Constituency: Bakklandet
- In office 1 January 1898 – 31 December 1900
- Constituency: Trondhjem and Levanger

Personal details
- Born: Johan Magnus Halvorsen; 10 June 1853 Ålesund, Møre og Romsdal, United Kingdoms of Sweden and Norway
- Died: 14 February 1922 (aged 68) Trondheim, Sør-Trøndelag, Norway
- Party: Free-minded Liberal Party
- Spouse: Hansine Amalie Smith (m. 1882)

Johan Magnus Halvorsen (10 June 1853 – 14 February 1922) was a Norwegian politician for the Free-minded Liberal Party.

== Biography ==
Halvorsen was born at Ålesund in Møre og Romsdal, Norway. He was a merchant by profession. He started his business career as a sales representative in Vanylven Municipality in Sunnmøre. In 1874 he became a director at Selje forbruksforening in Nordfjord. He later worked as a representative for several factories and businesses in Bergen. In 1881, he established himself as a merchant in Trondheim with a fish wholesaler.

Halvorsen was a member of the city council of Trondheim 1895-1904 and again from 1910. He represented the city in the Norwegian Parliament 1898-1900 and 1903–12. He was Minister of Finance from 1907 to 1908 in cabinet of Prime Minister Jørgen Løvland.
