= Andreas Kaddeland =

Norwegian physician and politician

Andreas Jonson Kaddeland (7 January 1858 – 5 July 1943) was a Norwegian physician and politician for the Liberal Party.

He was born in Holme, and spent most of his life as a farmer. He was a member of the municipal council of Holme Municipality from 1896, and served as mayor there for some time. He was a deputy representative to the Norwegian Parliament from the constituency of Mandalen during the term 1913–1915. In February 1913, upon the death of representative Thore Torkildsen Foss, Kaddeland became a full representative.
