= Temperance Party (Norway) =

Defunct political party in Norway

The Temperance Party (Norwegian: Avholdspartiet) was a political party in Norway. The party was closely associated with the Liberal Party. The party ran for election between 1907 and 1933 and had elected representatives and mayors in several municipalities around the country. As the name suggests, the main focus of the party was about alcohol and the Temperance movement. The party demanded increased education about the effects and dangers of alcohol in the educational system, confiscation of all profits on alcohol production and sales, and their ultimate goal was the total prohibition of alcohol in Norway.

Hans Seip, mayor of Bergen between 1923 and 1924, was a member of the party. The commander of the Salvation Army in Norway, Colonel Othilie Tonning, served as representative of the party in Kristiania's city council from 1907 to 1913.

== Election results ==
Storting
Date	Votes			Seats		Position	Size
Date	No.	%	± pp	No.	±	Position	Size
1906	167	0.1	New	0 / 123	New	Extra-parliamentary	5th
1909	5,076	1.20	▲1.10	0 / 123	0	Extra-parliamentary	▼6th
1912	884	0.18	▼1.02	0 / 123	0	Extra-parliamentary	▼7th
1915	3,820	0.62	▲0.44	1 / 123	▲1	Opposition	7th
