= Aura Hydroelectric Power Station =

Hydroelectric power station in Norway

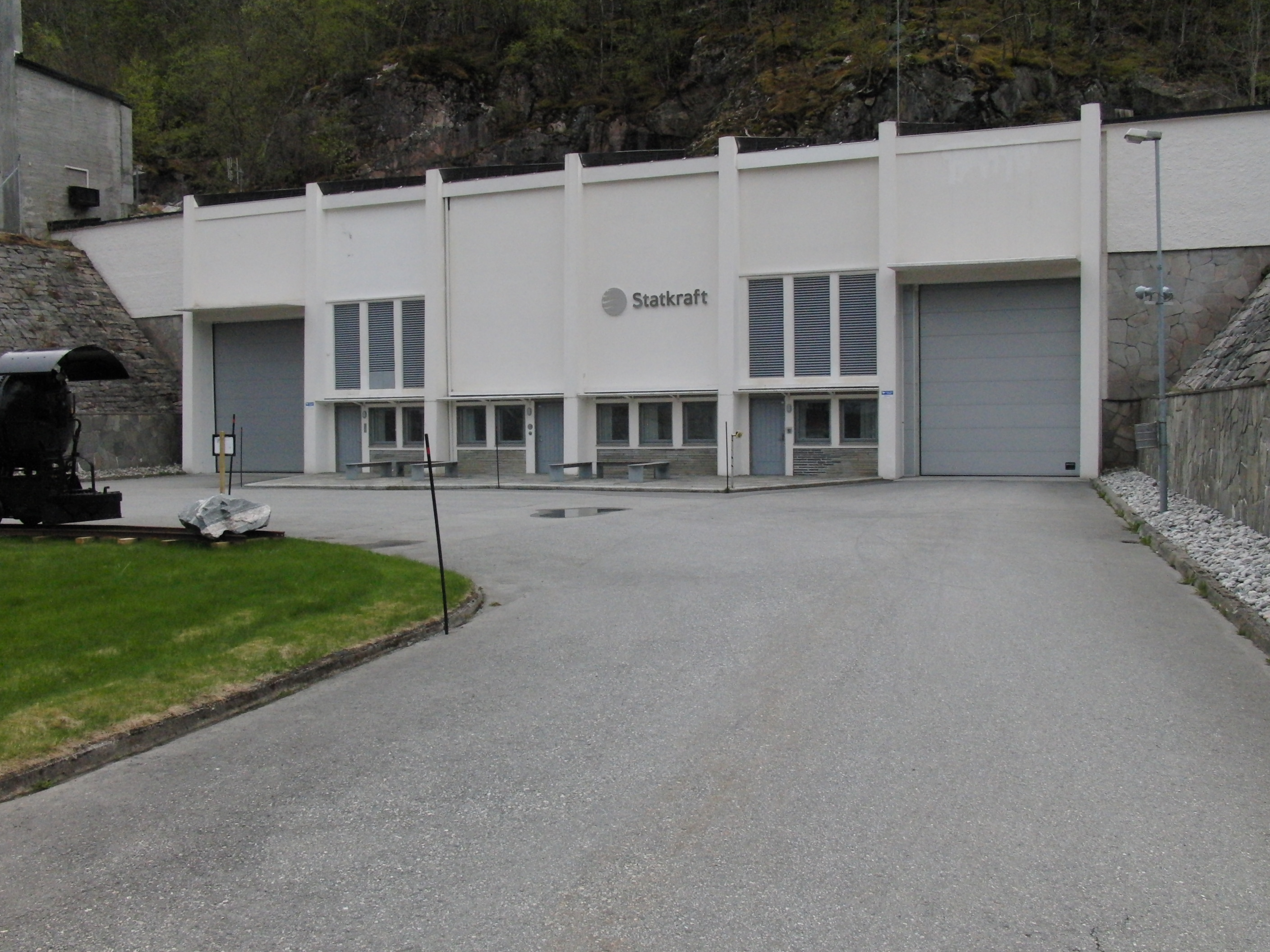
- Official name: Aura kraftverk
- Country: Norway
- Location: Sunndal Municipality
- Coordinates: 62°39′53″N 8°31′16″E
- Status: Operational
- Construction began: 1913
- Owner(s): Statkraft

Power Station
- Commission date: 1953; 72 years ago
- Hydraulic head: 783 metres (2,569 ft)
- Turbines: 7
- Installed capacity: 290 MW
- Capacity factor: 69.9%
- Annual generation: 1,776 GW·h

Aura Power Station (Norwegian: Aura kraftverk) is a hydroelectric power station located in Sunndal Municipality in Møre og Romsdal, Norway. It operates at an installed capacity of 290 megawatts (390,000 hp), with an average annual production of 1,776 gigawatt-hours (6,390 TJ).
