= Thore Torkildsen Foss =

Norwegian politician

Thore Torkildsen Foss (10 September 1841 – 8 February 1913) was a Norwegian politician for the Liberal Party.

He was elected to the Norwegian Parliament from the Lister og Mandal constituency in 1889, and was re-elected seven consecutive times. He died shortly after his last re-election, and was replaced by Andreas Kaddeland.

Born in Bjelland, he was a member of Bjelland municipal council from 1873 to 1901, serving as mayor for twenty-three years. The exact years are unknown. From 1885 to 1896 he was a member of the county committee, a forerunner of the county council.

He worked as a teacher from 1858 to 1866, and then as a farmer in Bjelland. In addition he served on local public committees.
