= Torger Holtsmark =

Norwegian politician

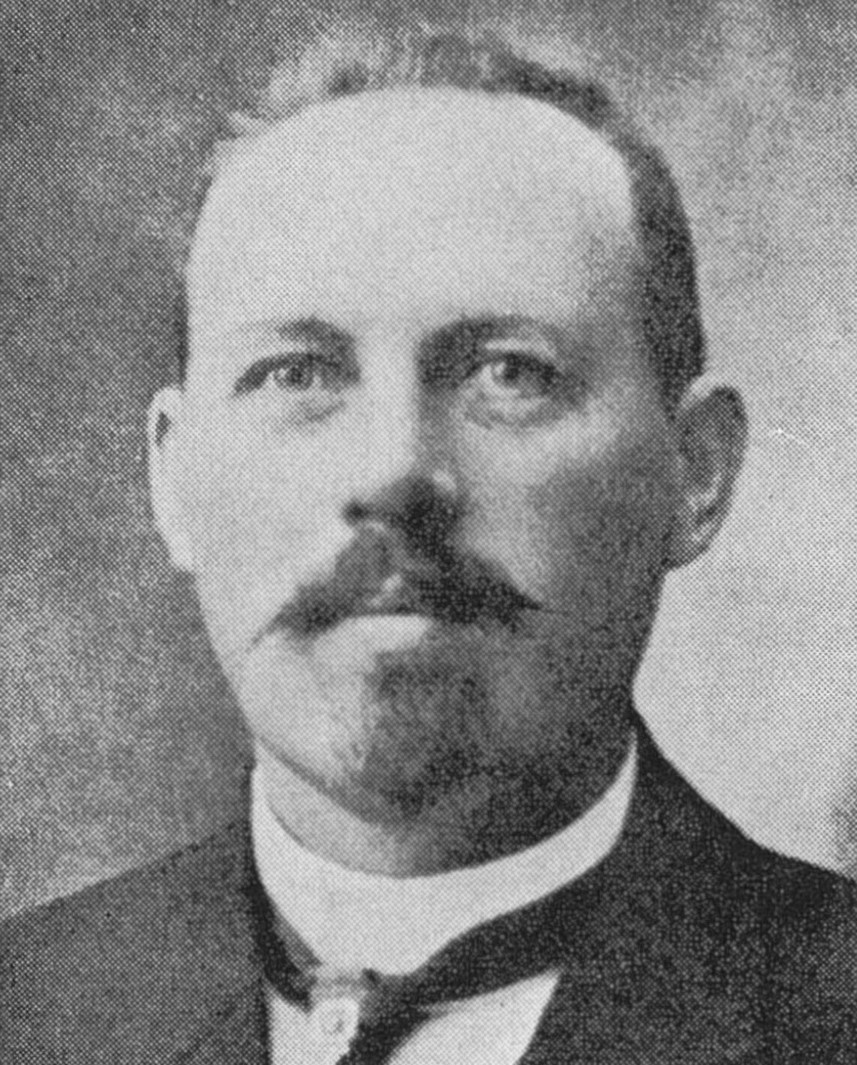
Image of Torger Bentsen Holtsmark

Torger Holtsmark (30 October 1863 – 1926) was a Norwegian farmer and politician for the Conservative Party.

He was born at Tveter farm in Asker as a son of Bent Holtsmark and his wife Anne Elisabeth Gabrielsen. He was a brother of Bernt and Wilhelm Holtsmark. Through his brother Gabriel, he was an uncle of professors Johan Peter Holtsmark and Anne Elisabeth Holtsmark, and painter Karen Holtsmark.

After graduating from the Higher College of Agriculture at Aas in 1886, he moved to his father's native Lier in 1889, taking over the farm Holtsmark at Sylling. He was a member of the municipal council from 1894 to 1907, serving as mayor from 1901. He was elected to the Norwegian Parliament from the constituency Buskerud in 1909, but only served one term. He was also active in the Royal Norwegian Society of Development.

Holtsmark died in 1926.
