= Free-minded Liberal Party =

Defunct Norwegian political party

Free-minded Liberal Party Frisinnede Venstre
- Founded: 1909
- Banned: 25 September 1940
- Split from: Liberal Party
- Merged into: Conservative Party (De facto)
- Newspaper: Tidens Tegn, Morgenavisen, Dagsposten
- Ideology: Conservative liberalism Economic liberalism National liberalism
- Political position: Centre-right

The Free-minded Liberal Party (Norwegian: Frisinnede Venstre) was a political party in Norway founded in 1909 by the conservative-liberal faction of the Liberal Party. The party cooperated closely with the Conservative Party and participated in several short-lived governments, including two headed by Free-minded Prime Ministers. In the 1930s the party changed its name to the Free-minded People's Party (Norwegian: Frisinnede Folkeparti) and initiated cooperation with nationalist groups. The party contested its last election in 1936, and was not reorganised in 1945.

== History ==
The Free-minded Liberal Party was founded in March 1909 under influence of Norway's first Prime Minister since independence, Christian Michelsen of the Liberal Party, after around a third of the Liberal parliamentary representatives had been excluded from a reconstitution of the Liberal Party in 1908. The party was founded in protest against the increasingly radical course of the "consolidated" Liberal Party, which the party's right wing considered to conflict with the party's traditionally liberal ideology. Other co-founders of the party included Abraham Berge, Wollert Konow, Sofus Arctander, Harald Bothner, Magnus Halvorsen, Ernst Sars, Ola Thommessen and Fridtjof Nansen.

The party cooperated closely with Conservative Party, and won 23 seats in the 1909 parliamentary election, after which the party formed a government together with the Conservatives with Wollert Konow as Prime Minister. The government did however not live up to the expectations of either Michelsen or the Conservatives, and the Conservatives withdrew from the government in 1911.

Konow's government came to an abrupt end in early 1912 after he declared his sympathies for the rural language form Landsmål in a speech to Norges Bygdeungdomslag, during the height of the Norwegian language conflict. The speech caused an uproar among militant Riksmål-supporters, especially among the Conservatives, but also in his own party, eventually leading to Konow's replacement as Prime Minister by Jens Bratlie. In 1911, when Jens Bratlie became prime minister and a deputy had to be called in, the first woman meeting as a parliamentary representative in Norwegian history became the party's Anna Rogstad, two years before full suffrage for women was granted in Norway.

=== Decline ===
The conflicts around Konow's failed government caused a major defeat for the Conservative-Free-minded alliance in the 1912 election, and reduced the Free-minded to insignificance with only four seats. The party organisation was increasingly merged into the Conservative organisation after 1912, until election gains and coalition victories in 1921 and 1924 sparked desires for a more independent party. The conflict resulted in numerous name-changes of the various Conservative local and regional chapters in attempts to signal a broader conservative-liberal profile. The two parties participated in several governments together in the 1920s, until they started drifting increasingly apart towards the end of the decade.

In 1931, the Free-minded changed their name to the Free-minded People's Party, and was subsequently reduced to a single representative from Trondheim in the 1933 election.

In 1934, negotiations started to unify the Fatherland League, the Farmers' Party, and Nasjonal Samling under a national bloc, with strong support from the Norwegian Agrarian Association. The Free-minded People's Party was the most eager participant in the negotiations, and wanted the parties to unite into a single nationalist party. The Farmer's Party eventually torpedoed the negotiations because of financial pressure from the Liberal Party, and the Conservative Party.

It contested its last election in 1936 in electoral cooperations with the Fatherland League and Nasjonal Samling, failing to secure a single seat. By then most of the local and regional chapters had returned to or joined the Conservatives.

The party was not reorganised in 1945. The first non-Labour Prime Minister after the war, John Lyng, was a member of the party before he joined the Conservatives in 1938. Historian and journalist Hans Fredrik Dahl has described the Progress Party as a spiritual successor to the party.

== Leaders ==
Party chairman

- Abraham Berge 1909–1910
- Magnus Halvorsen 1910–1912
- William Nygaard 1912–1915
- Erik Enge 1915–1918
- Bernt Holtsmark 1918–1922
- Oluf Müller 1922–1924
- Karl Wefring 1924–1925
- Peder Adolf Holm 1925–1930
- Anton Wilhelm Brøgger (acting, 1930–1931)
- Einar Greve 1931–1933
- Rolf Thommessen 1933–1936
- Rudolf Falck Ræder 1936–1937
- Trygve Swensen 1937–1939

Parliamentary leaders

- Magnus Halvorsen 1910–1912
- Bernhard Hanssen 1913–1915
- Bernt Holtsmark 1916–1921
- Wollert Konow (H) 1922–1924
- Abraham Berge 1925
- Hakon Magne Wrangell 1926
- Karl Wefring 1927
- Rolf Thommessen 1928–1930
- Einar Greve 1931–1933
- Rudolf Falck Ræder 1934–1936

General Secretaries

- Harald Hauge 1909–1911
- Anders Hauge 1911–1918
- Rolf Thommessen 1918–1924
- Bernhard Kjelstrup 1924–1936

== MPs elected ==
- Jakob Brevig (1910-1912)
- Erik Mathiassen Enge (1910-1912)
- Mathias Larsen Blilie (1910-1912)
- Helge Nilsen Thune (1910-1912)
- Ole Anunsen Strøm (1910-1912)
- Johan Gustav Austeen (1910-1912)
- Abraham Theodor Berge (1910-1912)
- Nikolai Larsen Lima (1910-1912)
- Lars Konrad Bjørnsen Jelsa (1910-1912)
- Iver Jonassen Svendsbøe (1910-1915)
- Wollert Konow (SB) (1910-1912)
- Kristian Olai Rasmussen Sandnes (1910-1912)
- Olaf Amundsen (1910-1912)
- Richard Bernhard With (1910-1912)
- Bjørn Kristensen (1910-1912)
- Johan Throne Holst (1910-1912)
- Tholf Grini (1910-1912)
- Ambortius Olsen Lindvig (1910-1912)
- Gustav Johannes Natvig (1910-1912)
- Cornelius Bernhard Hanssen (1910-1915)
- Fredrik Ludvig Konow (1910-1912)
- Johan Magnus Halvorsen (1910-1912)
- Henrik Lie (1910-1912)
- Kristen Christoffersen Kopseng (1913-1915)
- Henrik Spangelo (1913-1915)
- Bernt Holtsmark (1916-1921)
- Kristian Nilsen Dæhlen (1919-1921)
- Andor Hoel (1919-1921)
- Oluf Müller (1919-1921)
- Alfred Getz (1919-1921)
- Ove Christian Owe (1919-1921)
- Johan Rye Holmboe (1919-1924)
- Wollert Konow (H) (1922-1924)
- Haldor Virik (1922-1924)
- Eilert Præsteng (1922-1927)
- Kristian Fredrik Holst (1922-1924)
- Waldemar Heggelund Larssen (1922-1927)
- Wilhelm Martin Nygaard (1922-1924)
- Simen Fougner (1922-1924)
- Hakon Magne Wrangell (1922-1927)
- Joakim Sveder Bang (1922-1927)
- Karl Ivarsson (1922-1927)
- Karl Wilhelm Wefring (1925-1927)
- Ivar Johannesson Bleiklie (1925-1927)
- Bastian Adolf Width (1925-1927)
- Abraham Berge (1925-1927)
- Johan Henrik Rye Holmboe (1925-1927)
- Rolf Thommessen (1928-1930)
- Johan Henrik Bollmann (1928-1930)
- Einar Greve (1931-1933)
- Rudolf Ræder (1931-1933)

== Election results ==
Storting
Date	Votes			Seats		Position	Size
Date	No.	%	± pp	No.	±	Position	Size
1909	175,388	41.49 %^{1}	New	23 / 123	New	Coalition (from 1910, H–FV)	3rd
1912	162,074	33.15 %^{1}	▼8.34	4 / 123	▼19	Coalition (1912–1913, H–FV)	▼5th
1912	162,074	33.15 %^{1}	▼8.34	4 / 123	▼19	Opposition (from 1913)	▼5th
1915	179,028	28.98 %^{1}	▼4.17	1 / 123	▼3	Opposition	5th
1918	201,325	30.39 %^{1}	▲1.41	10 / 126	▲9	Opposition (1918–1920)	▲4th
1918	201,325	30.39 %^{1}	▲1.41	10 / 126	▲9	Coalition (from 1920, H–FV)	▲4th
1921	301,372	33.31 %^{1}	▲2.92	15 / 150	▲5	Opposition (1921–1923)	▼5th
1921	301,372	33.31 %^{1}	▲2.92	15 / 150	▲5	Coalition (from 1923, H–FV)	▼5th
1924	316,846	32.53 %^{1}	▼0.78	11 / 150	▼4	Opposition (1924–1926)	5th
1924	316,846	32.53 %^{1}	▼0.78	11 / 150	▼4	Coalition (from 1926, H–FV)	5th
1927	254,530	25.47 %^{2}	▼7.06	2 / 150	▼9	Coalition (1927–1928, H–FV)	▼6th
1927	254,530	25.47 %^{2}	▼7.06	2 / 150	▼9	Opposition (from 1928)	▼6th
1930	358,734	30.02%^{2}	▲4.55	5 / 150	▲3	Opposition	▲5th
1933	272,690	21.84 %^{2} (Note: Ran as Free-minded People's Party)	▲7.5	1 / 150	▼4	Opposition	5th
1936	329,560	1.3 %^{3}	▲0.8	0 / 150	▼1	Extra-parliamentary	?

Local
Year	Vote %	Type
1910	6.6	City Municipal
1913	5.8	City Municipal
1916	3.2	City Municipal
1919	2.0	City Municipal
1922	6.5	City Municipal
1928	1.9	City Municipal
1931	4.9	City Municipal
1934	3.07	City Municipal
1937	1.8	City Municipal

1. Full electoral cooperation with the Conservatives. The votes are united.
2. Support for individual lists. There were also joint lists with the Conservative Party
3. Support for individual lists with the Fatherland League. There were also joint lists with the Conservative Party.
