= 1918 Norwegian parliamentary election =

- 21 October 1918 (first round); 4–11 November 1918 (second round)

All 126 seats in the Storting 64 seats needed for a majority
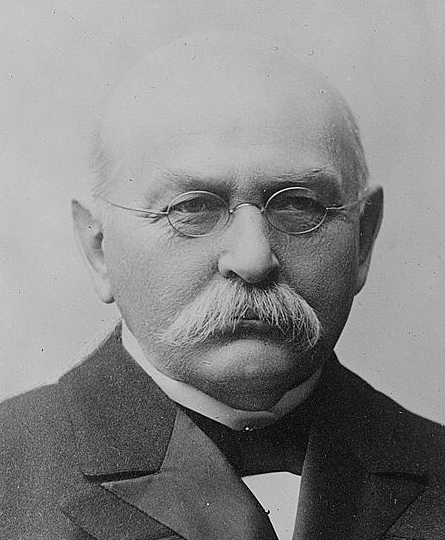

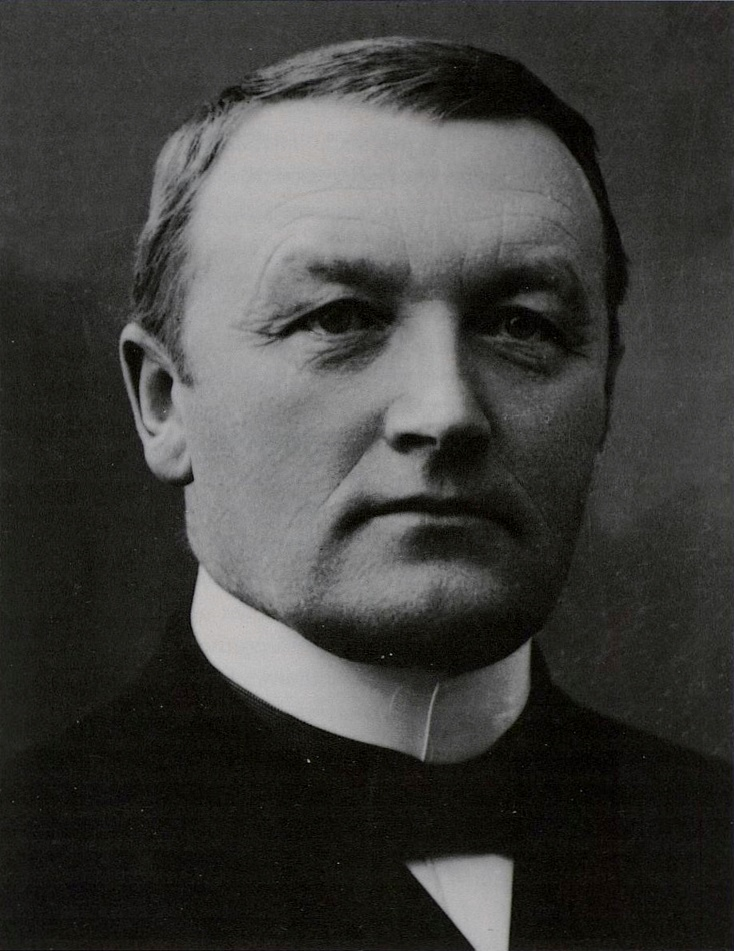

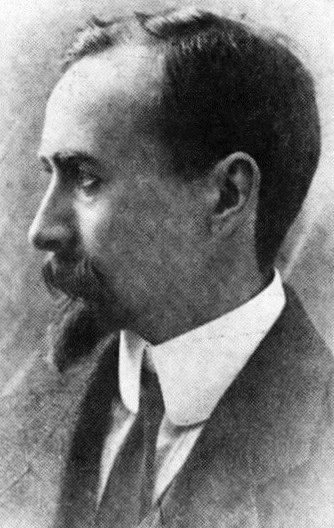

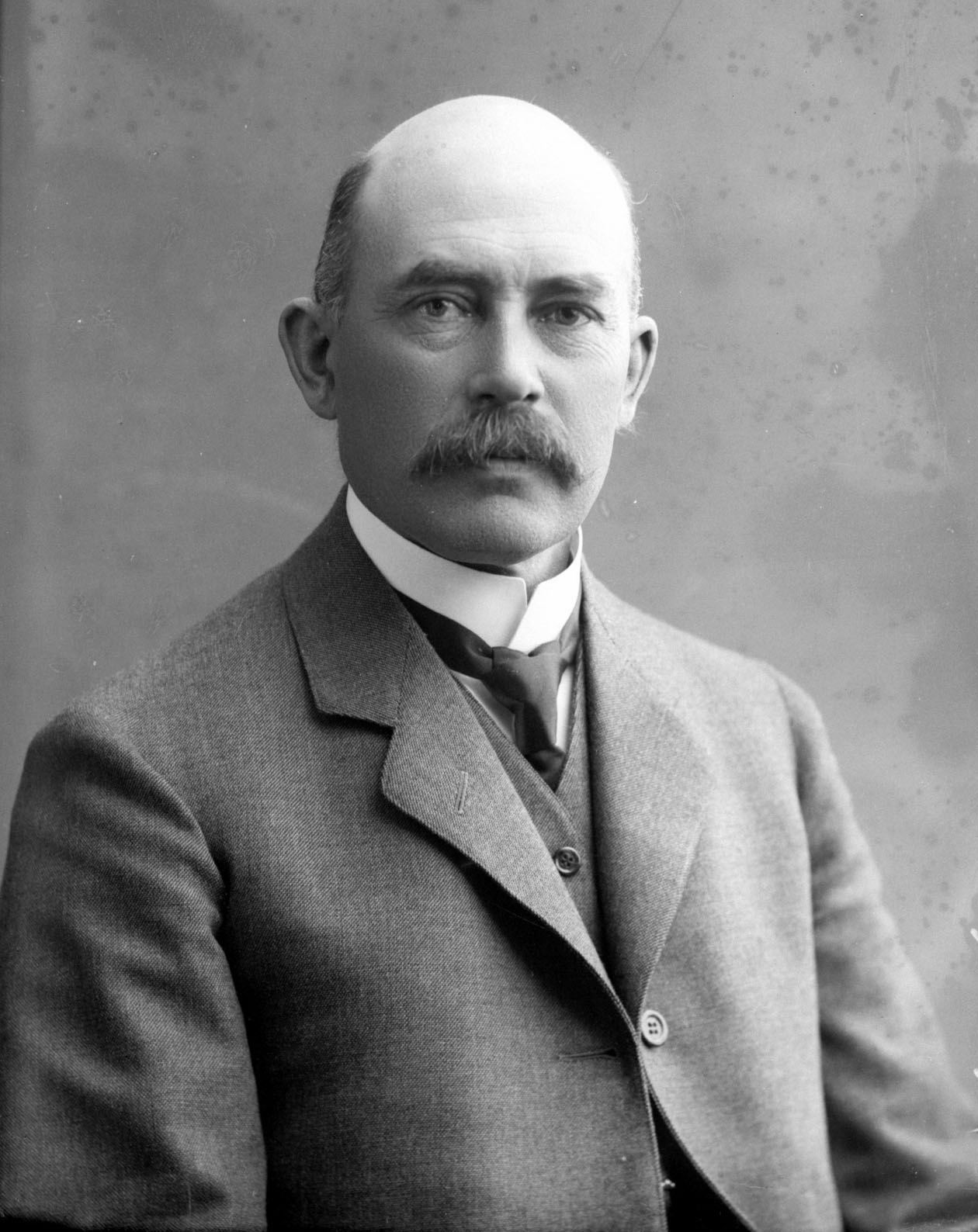

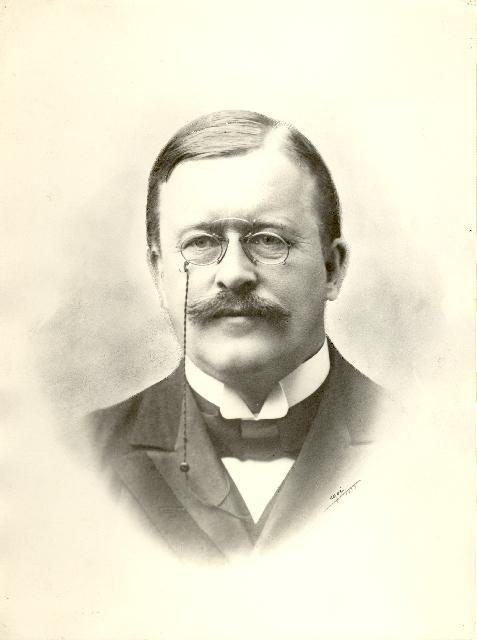
| | First party | Second party | Third party |
|---|---|---|---|
| Leader | Gunnar Knudsen | Jens Bratlie | Kyrre Grepp |
| Party | Liberal | Conservative | Labour |
| Last election | 33.07%, 74 seats | 28.98%, 20 seats | 32.07%, 19 seats |
| Seats won | 51 | 40 | 18 |
| Seat change | ▼23 | ▲20 | ▼1 |
| Popular vote | 187,657 | 201,325 (H+FV) | 209,560 |
| Percentage | 28.32% | 30.39% (H+FV) | 31.63% |
| | Fourth party | Fifth party | Sixth party |
| Leader | Bernt Holtsmark | | Johan Castberg |
| Party | Free-minded Liberal | Agrarian | Labour Democrats |
| Last election | 1 seat with H | 1.03%, 1 seat | 4.15%, 6 seats |
| Seats won | 10 | 3 | 3 |
| Seat change | ▲9 | ▲2 | ▼3 |
| Popular vote | Alliance with H | 30,925 | 21,980 |
| Percentage | — | 4.67% | 3.32% |
Prime Minister before election
Gunnar Knudsen
Liberal
Prime Minister after election
Gunnar Knudsen
Liberal

Parliamentary elections were held in Norway on 21 October 1918, with a second round between 4 and 11 November. The result was a victory for the Liberal Party, which won 51 of the 123 seats in the Storting. Despite receiving the most votes, the Labour Party won just 18 seats, a loss of one seat compared with the 1915 elections.

== Endorsements ==
=== National daily newspapers ===
| Newspaper | Party endorsed |
|---|---|
| Glommendalens Social-Demokrat | Labour Party |

== Results ==
| Party | Votes | % | Seats | +/– |
|---|---|---|---|---|
| Labour Party | 209,560 | 31.63 | 18 | –1 |
| Conservative Party | 201,325 | 30.39 | 40 | +20 |
| Free-minded Liberal Party | 201,325 | 30.39 | 10 | +9 |
| Liberal Party | 187,657 | 28.32 | 51 | –23 |
| Norwegian Agrarian Association | 30,925 | 4.67 | 3 | +2 |
| Labour Democrats | 21,980 | 3.32 | 3 | –3 |
| Other parties and independents (Note: Other candidates included Women's electors from Oslo and priest Alfred Eiken.) | 11,074 | 1.67 | 1 | –1 |
| Total | 662,521 | 100.00 | 126 | +3 |
| Valid votes | 662,521 | 98.10 | | |
| Invalid/blank votes | 12,856 | 1.90 | | |
| Total votes | 675,377 | 100.00 | | |
| Registered voters/turnout | 1,186,602 | 56.92 | | |
Source: Nohlen & Stöver
