= Radical People's Party (Norway) =

Former Norwegian political party

Radical People's Party Det radikale folkeparti
- Founded: 1906
- Dissolved: 1940 (de facto); 1965 (de jure)
- Split from: Liberal Party
- Merged into: Liberal Party
- Newspaper: Arbeideren
- Ideology: Labourism; Radicalism; Georgism (From 1909)
- Political position: Centre to centre-left

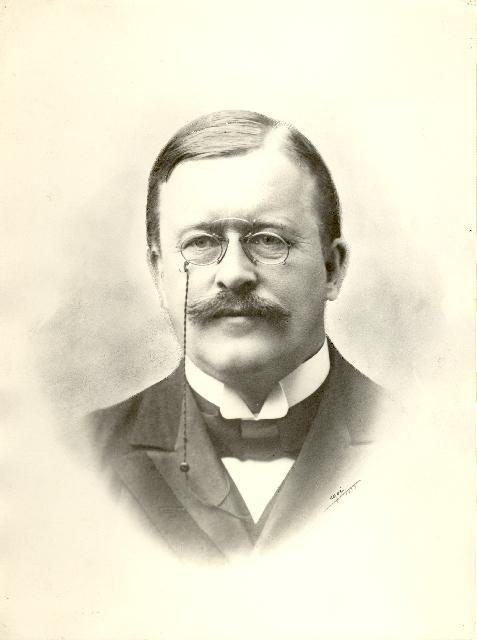
Party founder Johan Castberg

The Radical People's Party (Norwegian: Det radikale folkeparti), founded as the Labour Democrats (Norwegian: Arbeiderdemokratene), was a radical political party in Norway mainly active from 1906 to 1936, targeting workers and smallholders. The party was founded by Johan Castberg, who led the party until his death in 1926. He was succeeded in this position by Alf Mjøen, who also represented the party as a member of the Storting.

== History ==
The party was a successor to the United Norwegian Workers' Association (Norwegian: De forenede norske Arbeidersamfund, DFNA), a labour organisation associated with the Liberal Party, which due to conflicts with the mother party fielded Johan Castberg as a parliamentary candidate in the 1900 election. Castberg in turn founded a new party, the Labour Democrats in 1906. The party took part in its first election in 1906, and in 1912 and 1915 it won six parliamentary representatives.

For most of its history, the party cooperated with the Liberal Party. The party had its strongest support among small-scale farmers and landless agricultural labourers, based in a non-socialist ideology. In 1921 the party changed its name to the Radical People's Party (although its members continued to be referred to as "Labour Democrats").

The party eventually went into a steady decline. Only in Oppland did the party retain some influence. In the 1918 election, the party was reduced to one representative. At the election in 1936, it fell out of parliament altogether. After the Second World War, the party had effectively merged into the Liberal Party, although formally the parties had joint lists in Oppland until 1957. The party was formally dissolved in 1965.

== MPs elected ==
- Thore Embretsen Myrvang (1904–1910)
- Johan Castberg (1904–1928)
- Olav Andreas Eftestøl (1907–1915)
- Sigurd Andersen Fedje (1907–1910)
- Edvard Olsen Landheim (1910–1919)
- Ole Martin Lappen (1910–1918)
- Wollert Konow (H) (1913–1915)
- Ingebrigt Løberg (1913–1915)
- Alf Mjøen (1913–1936)
- Ole Gudbrandsen Hovi (1913–1915)
- Thore Myrvang (1916–1918)
- Olaus Trondson Islandsmoen (1916–1918)
- Johannes Torsteinsen Krukhoug (1919–1921)
- Peder Aslak Berntsen Owren (1925–1927)

== Election results ==
Storting
Election	Votes		Seats		Role
Election	#	%	#	±	Role
1903	with Venstre (Note: Candidates ran for the United Norwegian Workers' Association (DFNA).)		2 / 117	New	in opposition
1906	12,819	4.8	4 / 123	▲2	in opposition
1906	12,819	4.8	4 / 123	▲2	in coalition 1908–1910
1909	15,550	3.7	2 / 123	▼2	in coalition 1908–1910
1909	15,550	3.7	2 / 123	▼2	in opposition
1912	with Venstre		6 / 123	▲4	in opposition
1915	25,658	4.2	6 / 123	0	in opposition
1918	21,980	3.3	3 / 126	▼3	in opposition
1921	22,970	2.5	2 / 150	▼1	in opposition
1924	17,144	1.8	2 / 150	0	in opposition
1927	13,459	1.4	1 / 150	▼1	in opposition
1930	9,228	0.8	1 / 150	0	in opposition
1933	6,858	0.6	1 / 150	0	in opposition
1936	6,407	0.4	0 / 150	▼1	in opposition
