= Johan Peter Holtsmark =

Norwegian physicist

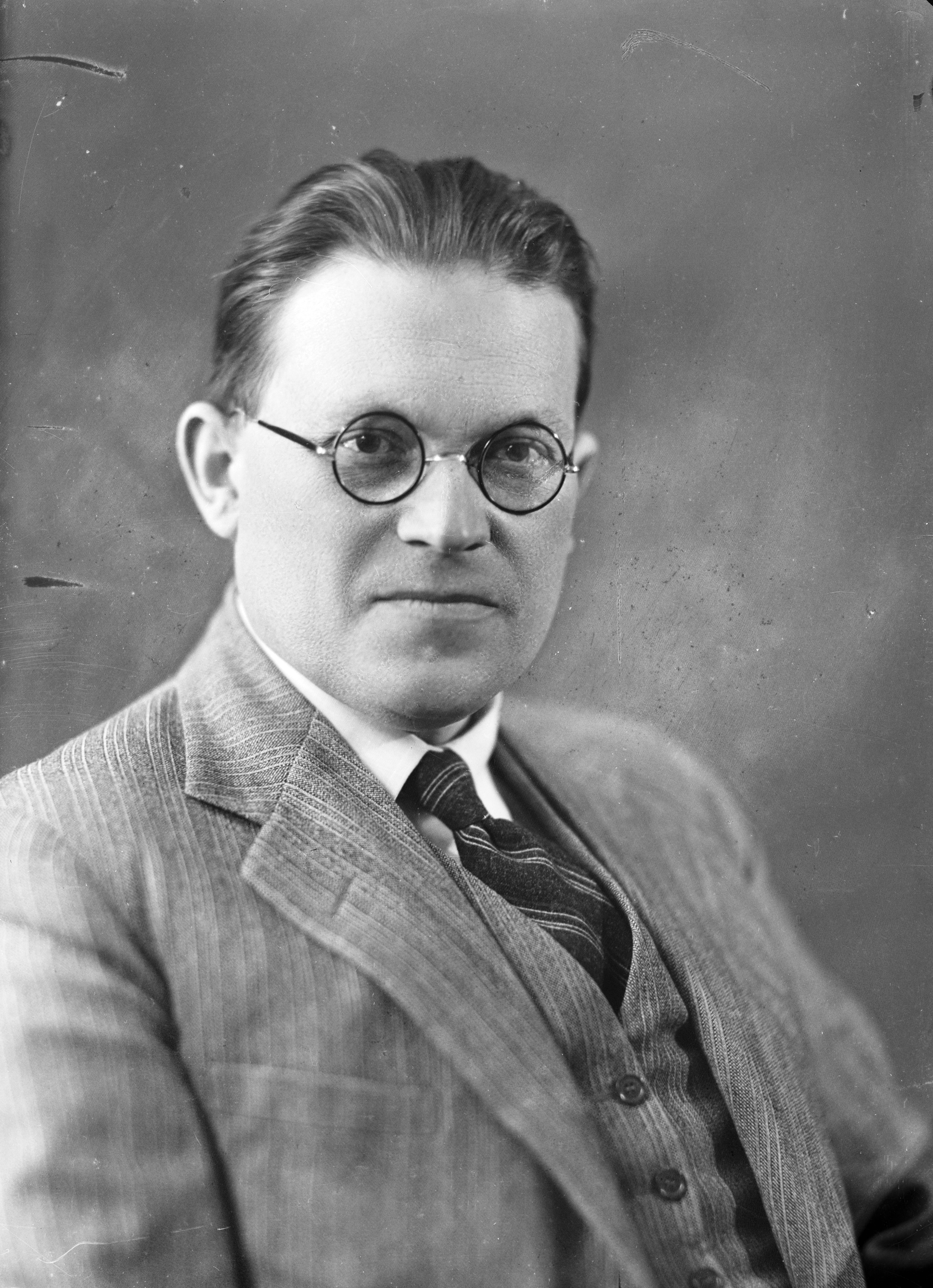
- Born: 13 February 1894; Asker, Norway
- Died: 10 December 1975 (aged 81); Bærum, Norway
- Education: University of Kristiania
- Known for: Holtsmark field distribution
- Scientific career
- Fields: Physics
- Workplaces: Norwegian Institute of Technology; University of Oslo

Johan Peter Holtsmark (13 February 1894 – 10 December 1975) was a Norwegian physicist, who studied spectral line broadening and electron scattering. In 1929, while at the Norwegian Institute of Technology, Holtsmark established acoustics research laboratories, focusing on architectural acoustics and sound insulation. Holtsmark was also a consultant for the Norwegian Broadcasting Corporation (NRK) throughout the 1930s.

Together with the Swedish physicist Hilding Faxén published Holtsmark a work in 1927 about scattering of electrons in gases. Here they introduced a new, mathematical method based upon partial waves. This is now standard and described in almost every modern book on quantum mechanics.

Between 1934 and 1937 he led the construction of a Van de Graaff accelerator at the Norwegian Institute of Technology, which became the first particle accelerator to go into operation in Scandinavia.

Holtsmark was one of the founding fathers of CERN and represented Norway to the European Council for Nuclear Research, which later led into the establishment of the organization itself.

He was awarded the Fridtjof Nansen Excellent Research Award in 1969, was a fellow of the Norwegian Academy of Science and Letters from 1925 and the Royal Norwegian Society of Sciences and Letters from 1926.

Awards
Preceded by Carl Semb	Recipient of the Fridtjof Nansen Excellent Research Award in Science; 1969	Succeeded by Lorentz Eldjarn
