= 1912 Norwegian parliamentary election =

- 21 October 1912 (first round); 4–11 November 1912 (second round)

All 123 seats in the Storting
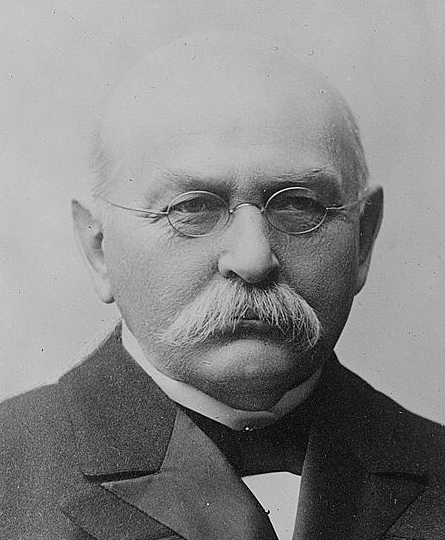

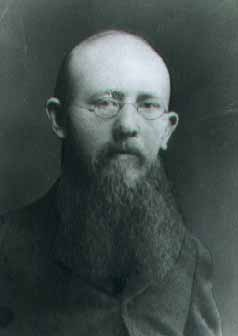

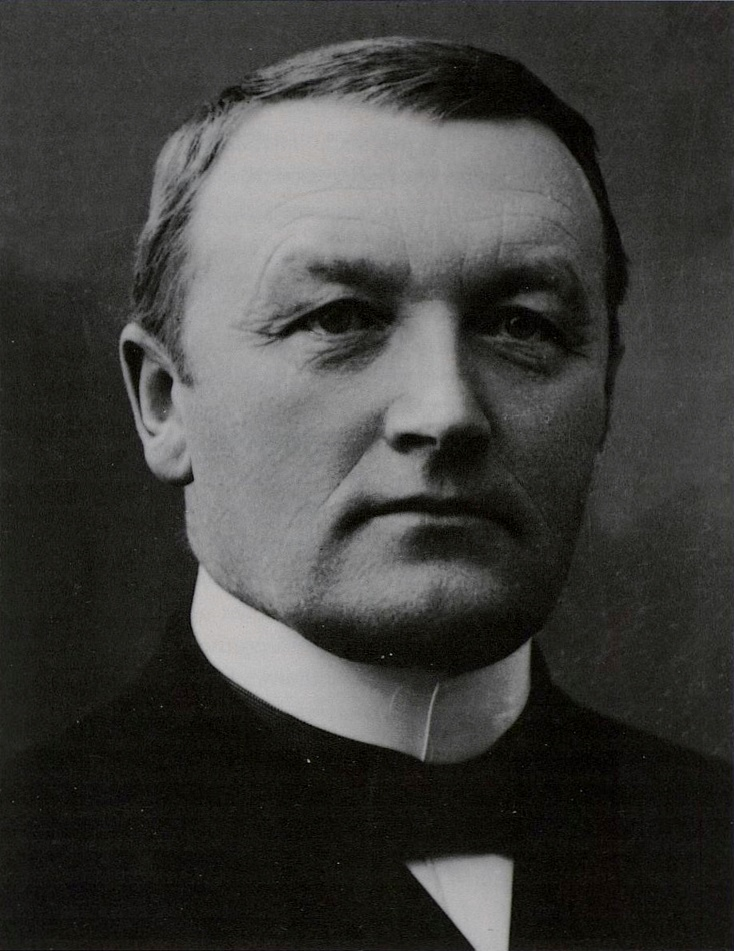

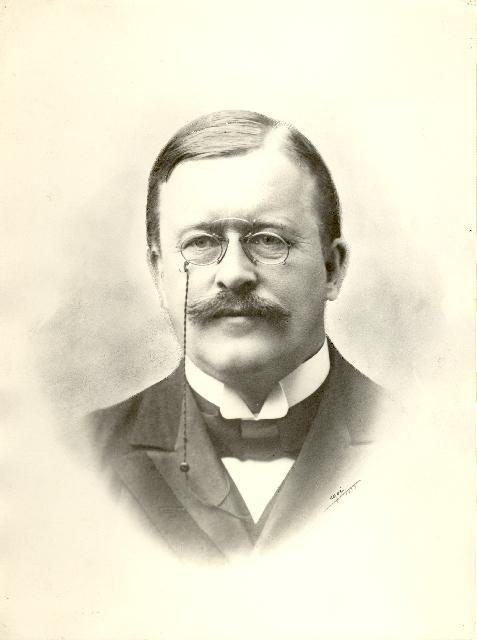

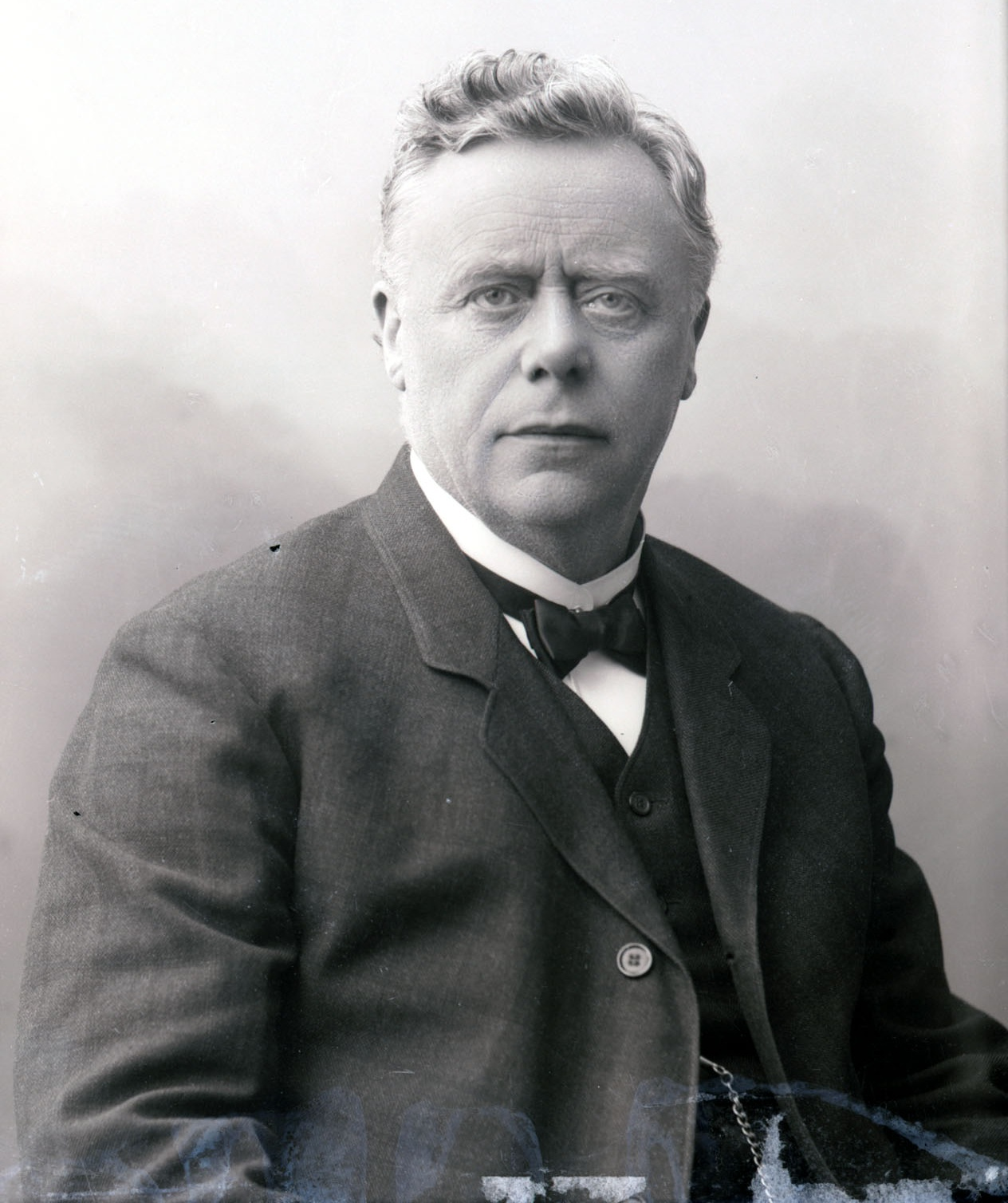
	First party	Second party	Third party
Leader	Gunnar Knudsen	Christian Knudsen	Jens Bratlie
Party	Liberal	Labour	Conservative
Last election	46 seats	11 seats	41 seats
Seats won	70	23	20
Seat change	▲24	▲12	▼21
Popular vote	195,526 (V+Ad)	128,455	162,074 (H+FV)
Percentage	39.99% (V+Ad)	26.3%	33.15% (H+FV)
	Fourth party	Fifth party
Leader	Johan Castberg	Magnus Halvorsen
Party	Labour Democrats	Free-minded Liberal
Last election	2 seats	23 seats
Seats won	6	4
Seat change	▲4	▼19
Popular vote	Alliance with V	Alliance with H
Percentage	—	—
Prime Minister before election
Jens Bratlie
Conservative
Prime Minister after election
Jens Bratlie
Conservative

Parliamentary elections were held in Norway on 21 October 1912, with a second round held between 4 and 11 November. The result was a victory for the alliance of the Liberal Party and the Labour Democrats, which won 76 of the 123 seats in the Storting.

== Endorsements ==
=== National daily newspapers ===
Newspaper	Party endorsed
Aftenposten	Conservative Party

== Results ==
Party	Votes	%	Seats	+/–
Liberal Party	195,526	39.99	70	+24
Labour Democrats	195,526	39.99	6	+4
Conservative Party	162,074	33.15	20	–21
Free-minded Liberal Party	162,074	33.15	4	–19
Labour Party	128,455	26.27	23	+12
Riksmål Party	1,033	0.21	0	New
Teetotaler Party	884	0.18	0	0
Independent Left Party	528	0.11	0	0
Church Party	367	0.08	0	0
Wild votes	36	0.01	–	–
Total	488,903	100.00	123	0
Valid votes	488,903	98.74		
Invalid/blank votes	6,254	1.26		
Total votes	495,157	100.00		
Registered voters/turnout	809,582	61.16		
Source: Nohlen & Stöver
