= Brunvand =

Brunvand is a surname. Notable people with the surname include:

- Jan Harold Brunvand (born 1933), American folklorist
- Olav Brunvand (1912–1988), Norwegian newspaper editor and politician
- Per Brunvand (1937–2015), Norwegian newspaper editor, son of Olav
