= Tumyr (surname) =

Tumyr is a surname. Notable people with the surname include:

- Arne Tumyr (1933–2023), Norwegian journalist, newspaper editor, and politician
- Erik Tumyr (1962–2011), Norwegian journalist, son of Arne
