= Bleness =

Bleness is a surname. Notable people with the surname include:

- Carsten Bleness, Norwegian newspaper editor
- Magne Bleness, Norwegian actor and theatre director
