= Jonas Gahr Støre =

Prime Minister of Norway since 2021

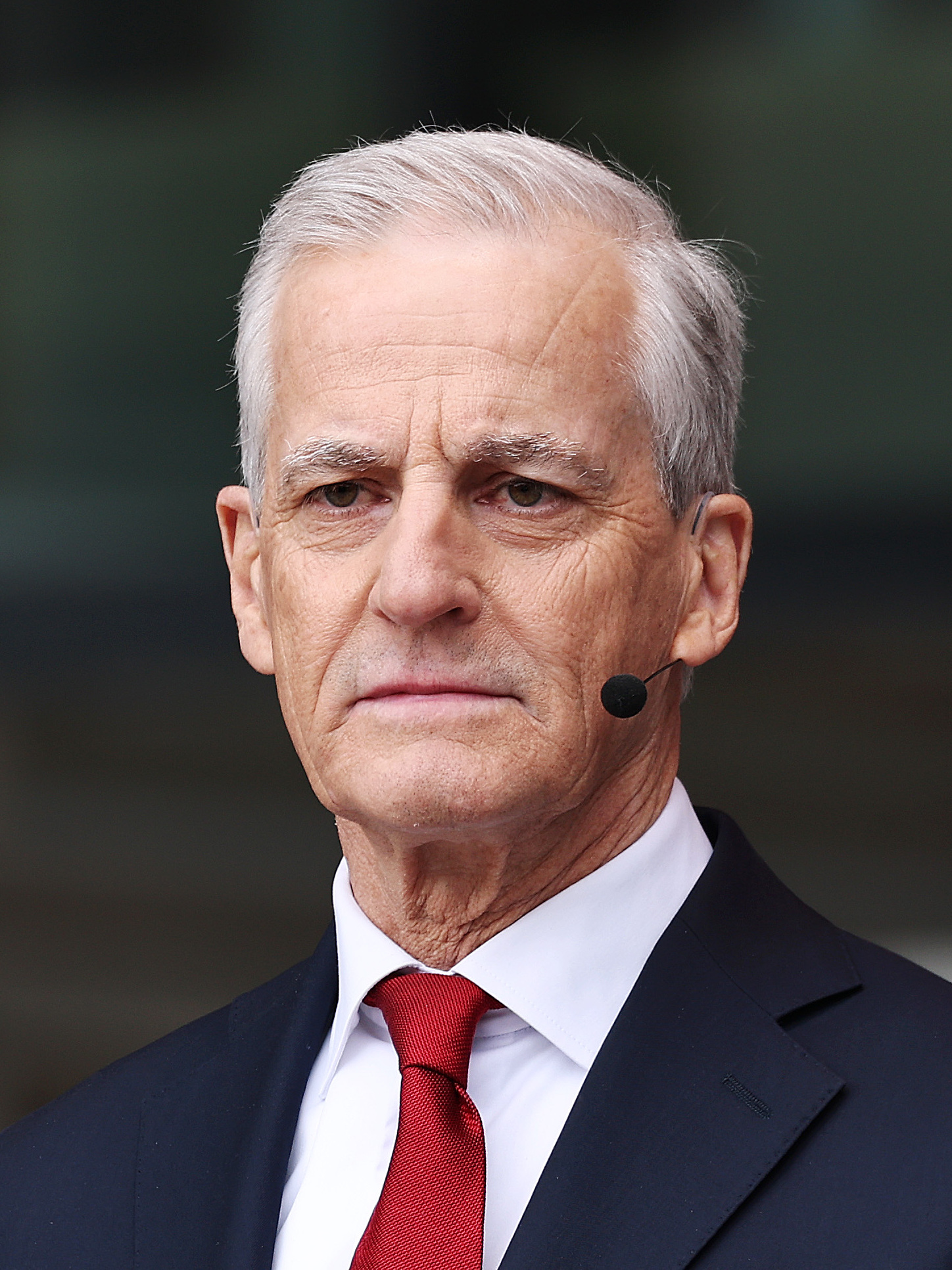
- Støre in 2026

Prime Minister of Norway
- Incumbent
- Assumed office 14 October 2021
- Monarchs: Harald V Haakon VIII
- Preceded by: Erna Solberg

Leader of the Opposition
- In office 14 June 2014 – 14 October 2021
- Monarch: Harald V
- Prime Minister: Erna Solberg
- Preceded by: Jens Stoltenberg
- Succeeded by: Erna Solberg

Leader of the Labour Party
- Incumbent
- Assumed office 14 June 2014
- First Deputy: Helga Pedersen; Hadia Tajik; Tonje Brenna
- Second Deputy: Trond Giske; Bjørnar Skjæran; Jan Christian Vestre
- Preceded by: Jens Stoltenberg
Ministerial positions
Minister of Health and Care Services
In office 21 September 2012 – 16 October 2013
Prime Minister	Jens Stoltenberg
Preceded by	Anne-Grete Strøm-Erichsen
Succeeded by	Bent Høie
Minister of Foreign Affairs
In office 17 October 2005 – 21 September 2012
Prime Minister	Jens Stoltenberg
Preceded by	Jan Petersen
Succeeded by	Espen Barth Eide

Member of the Storting for Oslo
- Incumbent
- Assumed office 1 October 2009
- Deputy: Truls Wickholm; Vegard Wennesland; Frode Jacobsen; Trine Lise Sundnes

Personal details
- Born: 25 August 1960 (age 66) Oslo, Norway
- Party: Labour (since 1995)
- Other political affiliations: Conservative (before 1989)
- Spouse: Marit Slagsvold (m. 1988)
- Children: 3
- Education: Royal Naval Academy; Sciences Po

Military service
- Allegiance: Norway
- Branch/service: Navy

Jonas Gahr Støre (Norwegian: [ˈjùːnɑs gɑː‿ˈʂtø̂ːrə]; born 25 August 1960) is a Norwegian politician who has served as the prime minister of Norway since 2021. He has been leader of the Labour Party since 2014. He served under prime minister Jens Stoltenberg as minister of foreign affairs from 2005 to 2012 and as minister of health and care services from 2012 to 2013. Støre has been a member of the Storting for Oslo since 2009.

Støre was born in Oslo, grew up in West End Oslo and underwent naval officer training at the Royal Norwegian Naval Academy. He studied political science at Sciences Po in Paris from 1981 to 1985 and international relations at the London School of Economics. As a student in Paris, he was active in the efforts to support the Jewish refuseniks in the Soviet Union.

Støre was a career special adviser and director-general in the Prime Minister's Office from 1989 to 1997, serving under prime ministers Jan Syse, Gro Harlem Brundtland, and Thorbjørn Jagland. He became known as a protégé of Brundtland in the 1990s, and her mentorship inspired him to become a member of the Labour Party in 1995. In 1998, he followed Brundtland to the World Health Organization, where he became her chief of staff. Støre was state secretary and chief of staff in the Prime Minister's Office in the first government of Jens Stoltenberg; the government was inspired by the British New Labour project. He later served as secretary-general of the Norwegian Red Cross from 2003 to 2005. Like his political mentors Brundtland and Stoltenberg, Støre is mostly associated with the business-friendly right-wing of the Labour Party. He became a household name for Norwegians during his tenure as foreign minister, when he was voted the most popular member of the cabinet several times.

Despite the Labour Party receiving 1% fewer votes and losing a seat, the centre-left won a majority in the 2021 Norwegian parliamentary election. As the leader of the largest party, Støre was the clear favourite for the role of prime minister. Two days after the resignation of Erna Solberg and her government on 12 October 2021, Støre was appointed as prime minister by King Harald V, leading a minority government with the Centre Party. In early 2025, the Centre Party left the coalition. Støre led the Labour Party to victory in the 2025 parliamentary election and has continued to lead a Labour minority government since.

== Background ==
=== Family ===
Born in Oslo, Støre is the son of ship broker Ulf Jonas Støre (1925–2017) and librarian Unni Gahr (1931–2021). He grew up in the Ris neighbourhood in West End Oslo. Støre is a multi-millionaire, with a fortune of around NOK 60,000,000 (approx. US$7,100,000 in 2016). He owns a large part of the family company Femstø. Most of the family fortune comes from the 1977 sale of Norwegian company Jøtul, which was run by his maternal grandfather Johannes Gahr. Støre's paternal grandfather was prominent business executive Jonas Henry Støre, the CEO and chairman of explosives manufacturer Norsk Sprængstofindustri. Støre's great-grandfather Paul Edvart Støre was a Conservative Party mayor and deputy member of the Norwegian parliament from Levanger, and the family were affluent farmers in Trøndelag in the 19th century.

Støre married Marit Slagsvold, a sociologist and minister in the state Church of Norway in 1988. They have three sons, who attended Oslo Waldorf School. Støre is a professed Christian and a member of the state church.

=== Education and early career ===
Støre attended Slemendal Primary School, Ris Lower Secondary School and Berg School in Oslo. He then underwent naval officer training at the Royal Norwegian Naval Academy from 1979 to 1980 before serving as a sub-lieutenant in the Royal Norwegian Navy from 1980 to 1981. He later studied political science for five years at Sciences Po in Paris. He started studying for a PhD at The London School of Economics, but dropped out after a few weeks.

In 1986, Støre was briefly a teaching fellow in the Harvard Negotiation Project at Harvard Law School. From 1986 to 1989 he was a researcher at the Norwegian School of Management, working on the Scenarier 2000 project with sociologist Andreas Hompland and economist Petter Nore.

== Career in public administration ==
Støre applied for a position as a political advisor on foreign affairs for the Conservative Party in 1988. He was offered the job but subsequently turned it down. In 1989, Støre became special adviser in the Prime Minister's Office of Gro Harlem Brundtland. Brundtland's mentorship inspired him to become a member of the Labour Party in 1995, when he also became a director-general (ekspedisjonssjef) in the Prime Minister's Office. From 1998, he was executive director (Chief of Staff) in the World Health Organization under the leadership of Gro Harlem Brundtland.

Støre was executive chairman of the ECON Analyse think tank from 2002 to 2003, and secretary general of the Norwegian Red Cross from 2003 to 2005.

== Political career ==
=== Chief of staff ===
Støre was State Secretary and Chief of Staff in the Prime Minister's Office in the first government of Jens Stoltenberg from 2000 to 2001. The government was inspired by the British Labour Party's New Labour agenda and oversaw the most widespread privatization in Norwegian history.

=== Foreign minister ===
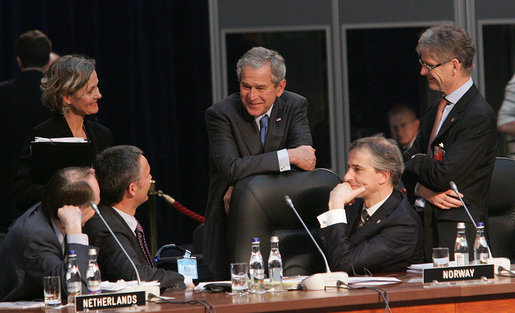
Støre and Jens Stoltenberg with US President George W. Bush during the NATO Summit in April 2008

After the 2005 parliamentary election, Støre was appointed foreign minister in Jens Stoltenberg's government, serving in that position until 2012. When he joined the cabinet he was perceived as part of a group of "West End executives" and confidants of Stoltenberg that represented a shift to the right. Nevertheless, numerous polls showed that Støre was the most popular member of the Stoltenberg government. However, he was also subject to criticisms in 2010 when he and Anne-Grete Strøm-Erichsen, minister of health, accepted expensive rugs from Afghan politicians.

In 2006, Støre voiced concern over the 2006 Lebanon War. Støre called Israel's reaction "totally unacceptable" and referred to it as "a dangerous escalation," while also condemning Hezbollah's attack on Israeli soldiers.

Støre criticized the expansion of influence of the G20 in response to the 2008 financial crisis, calling it "sorely lacking in legitimacy" and comparing it to the Congress of Vienna.

==== Assassination attempts ====
On 14 January 2008, a suicide bomber struck the Serena Hotel in Kabul, Afghanistan, where Støre was staying. Støre was unhurt in the incident, which killed six people including Norwegian journalist Carsten Thomassen. United Nations Secretary-General Ban Ki-moon stated that Støre was the target of the attack, but this claim was rejected by a Taliban spokesperson. Støre cancelled the rest of his visit to Afghanistan the day after the attack.

On 22 July 2011, Støre was one of the main targets of Anders Behring Breivik's attacks.

=== Minister of Health and Care Services ===
On 21 September 2012, Jens Stoltenberg commenced a cabinet reshuffle, and moved Støre to head the Ministry of Health and Care Services. He was succeeded as foreign minister by Espen Barth Eide.

=== Member of Parliament ===
In the 2009 general election in Norway, Støre was elected to the Norwegian parliament, the Stortinget, representing Oslo. He has been re-elected since.

As a member of parliament Støre nominated one of the two recipients of the 2021 Nobel Peace Prize, Maria Ressa.

=== Leader of the Labour Party ===
On 14 June 2014, he was elected leader of Labour Party, succeeding Jens Stoltenberg, who had been appointed Secretary General of NATO. He also became Leader of the Opposition. Støre led the party into the 2017 Norwegian parliamentary election, but the red-green coalition lost by four seats needed for a majority of 85 seats. His party was criticised for taking victory for granted.

In August 2017, Støre received criticism when it was revealed that workers in a building company hired to do work on his holiday home had not paid taxes or VAT.

In late 2017, several women alleged that the party deputy leader Trond Giske had behaved inappropriately against them. Initially, Støre stated that Giske hadn't behaved as such after an internal discussion regarding the matter. In early January 2018, Giske decided to resign as deputy leader as a result of the allegations, while reasoning from the party was also given that he had breached rules of sexual misconduct. Giske's successor, Bjørnar Skjæran, was nominated on 19 March 2019. Following the nomination, Støre praised Skjæran, saying he would be the clear voice from the North.

Støre led the party into the 2021 Norwegian parliamentary election, this time securing the red-green coalition a majority with 89 seats (85 being needed for a majority), defeating the blue-blue coalition led by incumbent prime minister Erna Solberg. Pre-government negotiations began on 23 September in Hurdal, after the Centre Party became open to working with the Socialist Left Party. On 29 September, the Socialist Left Party withdrew from negotiations, notably citing disagreements on issues such as petroleum and welfare. Støre expressed disappointment and said he had hoped for a different outcome, but added he respected the party's decision. The Labour Party and Centre Party began government negotiations later that same day. On 8 October, Støre and Vedum announced that the new government's platform would be presented on 13 October and that they were ready to form a government the day after, on 14 October. After Eva Kristin Hansen was nominated as the Labour Party's candidate for President of the Storting, Støre presented the proposal in the Storting on 9 October, and the vote to confirm her happened in writing. Hansen was confirmed with 160 votes in favour and 8 abstaining.

== Prime Minister of Norway (2021–present) ==
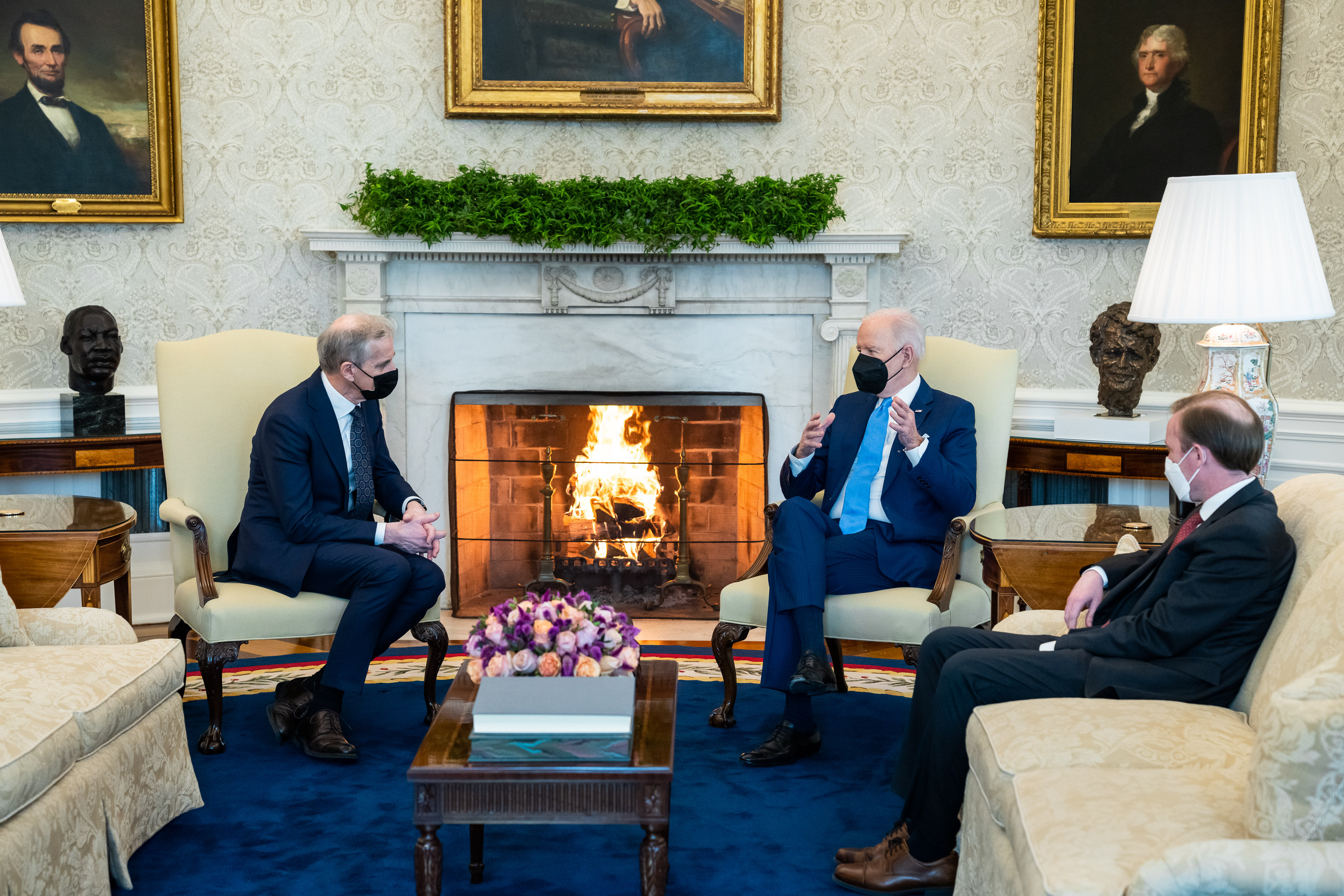
Støre with U.S. President Joe Biden and Jake Sullivan in January 2022

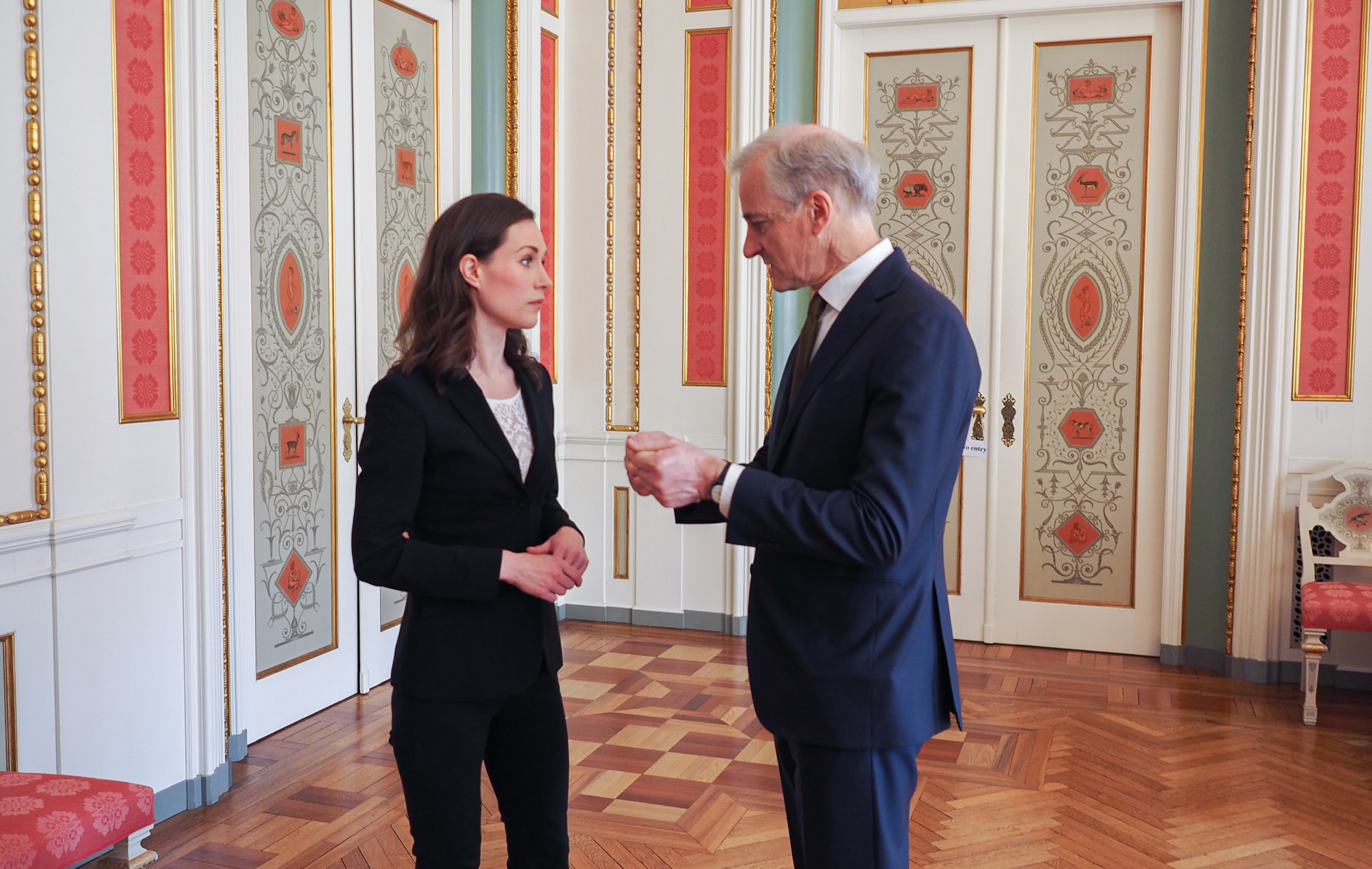
Støre with Finnish Prime Minister Sanna Marin in May 2022

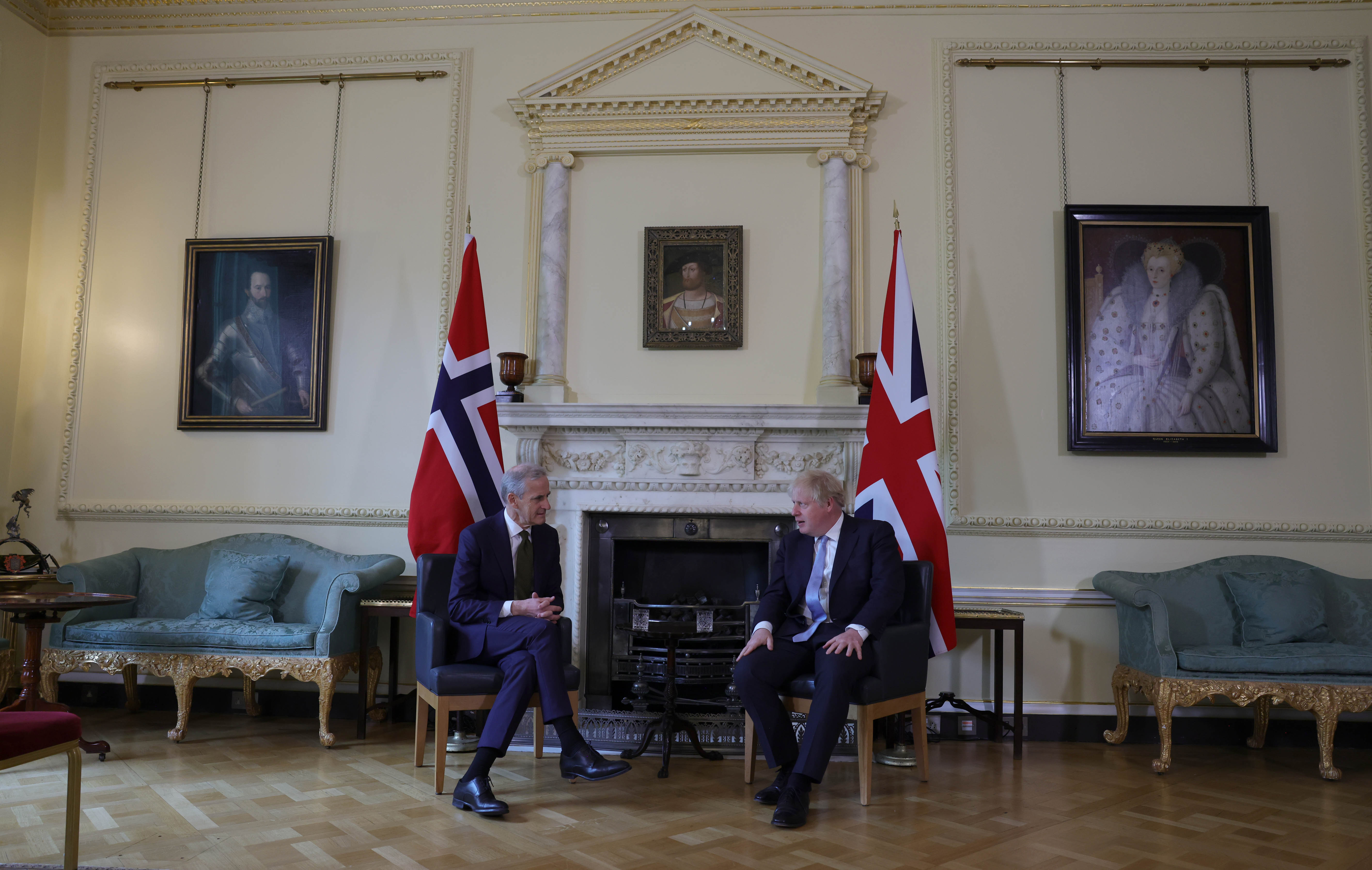
Støre with British Prime Minister Boris Johnson in May 2022

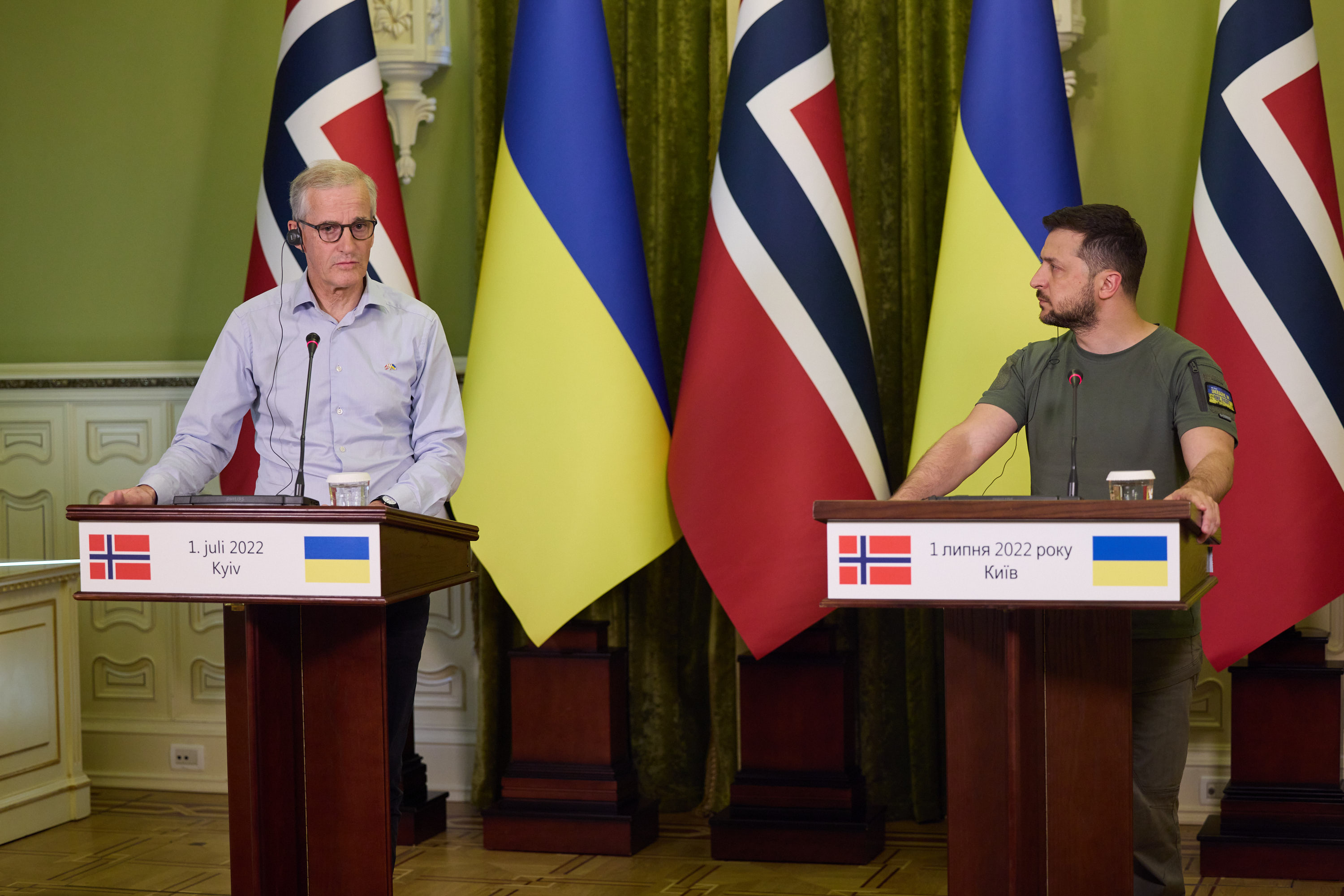
Støre with Ukrainian President Volodymyr Zelenskyy in July 2022

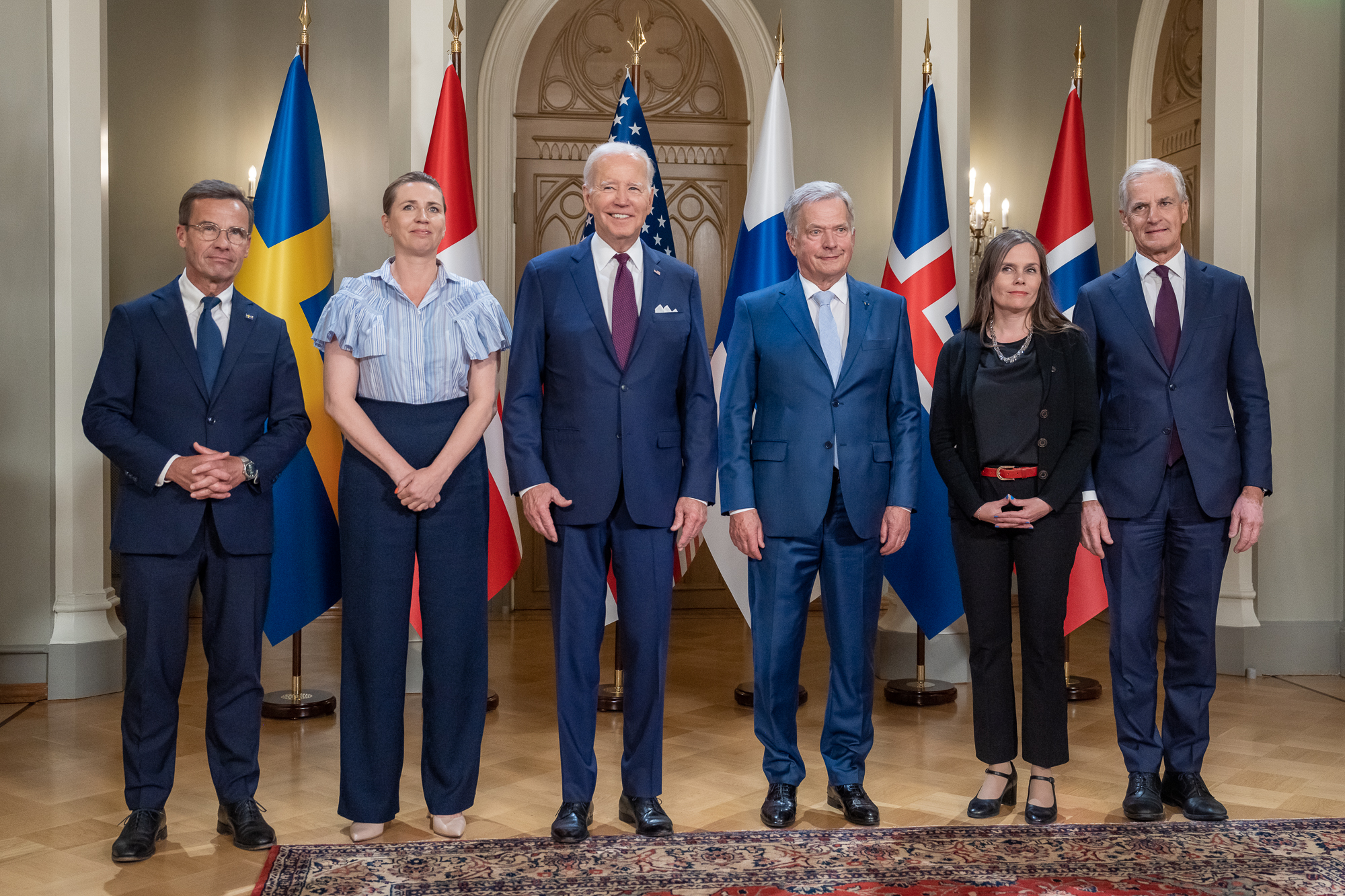
Støre with U.S. President Joe Biden and other Nordic leaders in Helsinki, July 2023

Støre was appointed prime minister on 14 October 2021, following his party's victory in the parliamentary election held in September. He formed a minority government, with the Labour Party and Centre Party. The Centre Party withdrew from government in late January 2025, leaving Støre in charge of the first Labour minority government in 25 years. Støre led his party to re-election at the 2025 parliamentary election. He announced that the Labour Party would continue as a minority government, and that he would invite the other red-green parties to conversations about the cooperation in the upcoming parliamentary term.

=== Domestic policy ===
Støre made his government's ascension declaration on 18 October, reiterating major parts of the government platform. These included "to combat social dumping and carry out a major clean-up in Norwegian working life to secure permanent, full-time positions with Norwegian pay and working conditions", to remove general access to temporary hiring, to limit hiring, to fight work-related crime, and to stop the release of the taxi industry. As regards industrial policy, Støre commented that "to succeed, we must ensure that Norwegian natural resources, including reasonably renewable energy, remain a competitive advantage for Norwegian industry", while also announcing a green industry initiative where the state would participate to get new industry up and running. Regarding regional policy, Støre said that the government would put forward a case to the Storting to separate Troms and Finnmark once again, and doing the same for Viken, if the county council should wish to do so. In regard to transport, Støre stated that "the prices on national and county road ferries shall be halved during the four-year period", while also reiterating the promise of free ferries between islands and communities without a road connection to the mainland. This also included ferry connections carrying under 100 000 passengers annually. Støre also announced that his government would act to reduce the increased electricity prices, and indicated that this could be in place within a short timespan.

In a parliamentary session a week after assuming office, Støre defended the idea of increasing the sales tax on more expensive electric cars. He said that the money earned could be used to construct new charging stations. He further said that his government would initiate discussions with the European Union about how to strengthen their cooperation to reach the climate goals. Conservative Party leader Erna Solberg also called on Støre to clarify his government's strategy to tackle COVID-19, following a recent spike in hospital admissions. Støre responded that his government was following the COVID-19 situation and would inform the Storting and public if necessary. He also notably said: "Something must have happened since Thursday until today that gives cause for concern when one now wants a briefing from the Prime Minister in the Storting." He also said that the government had not received any messages from health authorities that would give cause for deep concern.

On 12 November, Støre announced that his government would be introducing new national COVID-19 measures. These would include allowing municipalities to introduce COVID-19 passports; offering everyone over the age of 18 a booster vaccine dose; tightening the rules on who is in need of testing; and introducing new rules for unvaccinated health personnel. He also stated that the government was considering more extensive use of the COVID-19 certificate, and that they planned for everyone over the age of 18 to be offered a third vaccine dose next year.

On 29 November, Støre, minister of finance Trygve Slagsvold Vedum and Socialist Left leader Audun Lysbakken presented their re-negotiated state budget for 2022. Støre called it a "good budget [that] has become better". He reiterated that the budget showed that it was "ordinary people's turn". The negotiations had originally begun on 15 November; the party leaders had been called in the weekend before the budget presentation.

On 2 December, Støre, his government and health officials announced measures against the SARS-CoV-2 Omicron variant. Some of the measures were reiterated from previous COVID-19 measures, notably that people should keep distance between themselves, and wearing masks on public transport. In addition, the measures called for people to wear masks in malls and shops and while in contact with health services; not to hug or give handshakes; and for businesses to work from home in a manner that would not affect essential services.

On 7 December, Støre and his government put forward further COVID-19 measures. Of the new measures, Støre said: "We should have sincerely hoped that we were done with the corona pandemic now and hoped for a long time that Christmas could be as before and as normal, but now the situation with infection is still so serious that we must take new measures." He further stated that the danger of overloading the health service and the spread of the omicron variant made new measures necessary. The measures covered the following: distance and social contact, leisure activities, schools, kindergartens and after-school programs, labour and ventilation. Two days later, Støre didn't rule out that further measures could be announced, although they could perhaps include a few adjustments to already presented measures.

On 13 December, Støre and his government announced further measures to battle COVID-19 and the omicron variant. The measures were said to be to prevent hospitals being overwhelmed and to protect socially critical functions. He stressed that the situation had become more critical and that the measures were put in place to maintain control of the pandemic. He also stressed that it was important to shield children, young people, and vulnerable groups, and that the measures would be noticed in people's everyday life.

In early January 2022, Støre said that COVID-19 measures should not be in place any longer than necessary. He also stated that having a yellow clearance level in upper secondary schools was a target for them, and eventually getting it to green by more testing. He emphasised that the country was not in lockdown but had strict measures that understandably had ramifications for people.

On 13 January, the government announced the lifting of a few COVID-19 measures, and a few changes to others. Støre warned that it might be necessary to adjust the measures to be stricter in the future, and said that a new evaluation would be made in early February.

On 12 February, Støre and his government announced the lifting of almost all measures against COVID-19, notably social distancing and mandatory mask wearing. Remaining measures included practising good hand and coughing hygienes, following the vaccine program, and getting tested for possible symptoms. Støre reiterated that the pandemic was not over, citing the current situation in the midst of an ongoing omicron wave.

On 20 April, Støre issued an apology to the queer community, marking the 50th anniversary of the abolishment of anti-homosexual legislation in Norway. He stated: "119 people were criminalized and punished for their love life. They had to go through trials, convictions and imprisonment. They faced public shame and condemnation. Through legislation, but also through a network of sanctions, we as a nation and society clearly stated that we did not accept queer love. The government wants to apologize for that."

On 16 June, following the Standing Committee on Foreign Affairs and Defence's vote on Swedish and Finnish NATO membership, Støre and all opposition parties criticised the Red Party for voting against approval, describing it as indicative of a lack of solidarity. Støre specifically said: "The Red Party's view expresses an attitude fundamentally lacking in solidarity".

In early August, Støre stated that his government would "do what's necessary" to combat the exorbitant electricity prices and added that a maximum price was one of several measures that was being considered. He also stated that another measure was to limit how much power companies can pay for electricity, while also no measures would be "undividedly positive".

Following the Norwegian Directorate of Fisheries's decision to euthanise Freya the Walrus, Støre expressed support for the decision. Regarding the massive response to the walrus's death, he said: "I am not surprised that this has led to many international reactions. Norway is a maritime nation, sometimes we have to make unpopular decisions. I myself have been in discussions about minke whales and seals. These reactions are not new".

In September, he said that the state budget for 2023 could be "disappointing", noting that several promises from the Hurdal platform would have to be put on hold.

On 3 November, in preparation for the 2022 United Nations Climate Change Conference, Støre announced that his government would be increasing the climate goal from 50% to 55%. His environment minister, Espen Barth Eide, added that this change would include every sector and climate gases.

In early December, controversy arose when it was announced that Kristoffer Thoner would be appointed as an advisor to the Prime Minister's Office. The issue was Thoner's previous experience from McKinsey & Company where his customer lists were confidential. Despite this, Støre expressed confidence in Thoner. McKinsey would later declassify Thoner's customer lists at the request of the Prime Minister's Office.

On 2 March, after his energy minister apologised on behalf of the government to the Sami people for human rights violations with wind farms placed at Fosen in Trøndelag, Støre also expressed his apology.

A week after the Fosen protests ended, Støre visited the Sámi Parliament of Norway and held a speech to the assembly. He talked about combating harassment against Sami people and pledged that his government would follow up on the ruling for Fosen. The youth league of the Norwegian Sámi Association warned that protests would resume unless the government saw to handle the issue, with their leader, Elle Nystad, stating that it would serve as a reminder that an apology isn't sufficient unless the case is followed up on.

On 28 March, Støre and his government announced that they would be lowering the basic interest tax for aquaculture to 35%, which will come into force from 1 January 2024.

In September, he and higher education minister Sandra Borch announced that the government would invest 1 billion NOK in research of artificial intelligence and digital technology. The investment was praised by both AI researchers and the opposition.

In March 2024, Støre announced that Norway would be able to reach the goal of spending at least 2% of GDP on defence by the beginning of July that same year, rather than after two years, as previously predicted. The goal originated as a non-binding agreement among NATO members and states that each member state should aspire to spend at least 2% of their GDP on defence. Støre has praised this aim, though many commentators see it as conspicuous that it has received far more support and traction after Donald Trump and others have in effect made threats against those countries which fail to reach it.

==== Energy ====
In an October 2021 interview with the Financial Times, Støre said that if Norway were to halt its petroleum industry, it would only contribute to a further struggle to reach the climate goals. He went on to say "we should develop towards a transition [from fossil fuels to green energy], not close it [the fossil fuels industry] down". Støre further added that it was a paradox that Norway, as Western Europe's largest petroleum producer, also spent significant funds on investment in green technology such as electric cars, carbon capture and storage and offshore wind power. Regarding the country's petroleum fund, he said it was political, but was driven by professionals whose aim was to gain much in return for an acceptable risk. He also emphasised that it was up to the government and Storting to set the boundaries for the fund.

On 27 October, Støre announced a decrease in the fuel tax to be implemented in the 2022 state budget, while expressing concern about the increasing electricity costs. He said the revised budget would be presented on 8 November, adding: "We also want a policy that cuts taxes that hit ordinary people. Both in terms of taxes on fuel and electricity, we will look at this in our additional budget." He also said that the financial situation of municipalities should be strengthened so they could offer better welfare services.

On 5 December, Støre expressed hope that a plan to deal with the ongoing electricity price crisis would be figured out before Christmas. He stated that the solution might involve additional money, and emphasised that the scheme had to work and that the government would make sure that it did. He added that the purpose of the plan was to help the most vulnerable, and that it had to be done in a fail-safe way and would not apply to everyone in Norway.

At a press conference held on 11 December, Støre, alongside Vedum and minister of petroleum and energy Marte Mjøs Persen, announced a new security scheme to battle the rising electricity prices. In particular, if the average market price of power were to exceed 70 øre per kilowatt hour for a month, the state would compensate half of the price above this level. The scheme would last throughout December and through March 2022. Støre notably said: "We present a security scheme that will meet the situation that ordinary people experience with extraordinary electricity costs."

On 8 January 2022, Støre and Vedum said that the electricity support would be increased from 55 to 80% until at least March. He stated that the government would stand up against the electricity crisis in the next years should it happen again, and also defended the government's scheme, saying: "The scheme is good, because it allows us to quickly and accurately compensate all the country's consumers, by directly providing a subsidy to the electricity bill." Støre added that the government expected the prices to drop come spring, as they usually did, and that a similar scheme could be necessary should the prices rise again during future winters.

At an unexpected press conference held on 28 September, Støre and finance minister Trygve Slagsvold Vedum announced that the government would be taking in 33 billion NOK from the power producers and aquaculture industries. Støre stated: "For this government, it is not relevant to cover the costs with large cuts, that is an alternative, we do not choose that. We have so far placed great emphasis on protecting the welfare state. For this government, it is not relevant to increase taxes for ordinary people". The aquaculture industry went out against the possibility of a basic interest tax for aquaculture and expressed that it would "shut off the lights along the coast".

Støre was asked at his first question time of 2023 in the Stortinget about Minister for Higher Education Ola Borten Moe's criticism of his own government's energy investment in hydrogen. Støre responded by saying that Borten Moe was simply wrong. Talking to the newspaper Aftenposten afterwards he added that in a [«imagined»] world with no challenges from climate change, it wouldn't have been necessary to bring hydrogen into the energy mix.

Støre and his ministers, Trygve Slagsvold Vedum and Terje Aasland, announced on 15 February 2023 that the electricity support scheme would be expanded until 2024. Other changes also included an hourly based calculation rather than monthly, and an increase from 70 to 90% per kilowatt hour, including during the summer months.

In August, Støre and his government announced that they would allow electrification of the Melkøya power development plant, which would ensure that it could stay operational until 2040. Støre further argued that the measure would cut emissions by 850 000 tons.

In late January 2025, he and energy minister Terje Aasland announced a new line of electricity actions. This included a fixed price, a VAT cut, scrapping plans for new overseas cables until 2029 and a rejection of one of the four EU directives, the latter of which was part of the reason coalition partner the Centre Party withdrew from government.

In August 2026, he and energy minister Terje Aasland presented a series of reforms to the energy sector. This notably included simplifying procedures for onshore wind power projects, hydropower and power grid developments, and municipalities right to accepting or rejecting projects would be enshrined in law. The reforms are scheduled to come into effect by the end of the parliamentary period (late 2029) and into the 2030s.

==== Response to terrorism ====
Following the Kongsberg attack a day before he assumed office, Støre and then-Minister of Justice and Public Security Emilie Enger Mehl visited the city the day after, where they put down flowers in memory of the victims. Støre said that the visit was also intended to show solidarity with the people of Kongsberg.

Following the 2022 Oslo shooting during the Pride Festival, Støre said that "we know that queer people are the targets of hate, threats and violence. The hate against trans people is particularly severe. We will not accept that in Norway."

==== Youth affairs ====
In April 2026, Støre and his government announced that they would implement an age restriction for social media, setting at 16. The proposal would only allow children to utilise social media from 1 January the year they turn 16. Støre argued that this was necessary to not cause an uneven divide in access to social mediums in school classes. Furthermore, that the restriction was meant to help protect children from harmful content and to regulate their time spent on different platforms. The Norwegian Data Protection Authority was critical of the government's proposal, but primarily in regards to them continuing to allow tech companies to uphold age verification of children, citing concerns for privacy policies not being properly enforced.

=== Foreign policy ===
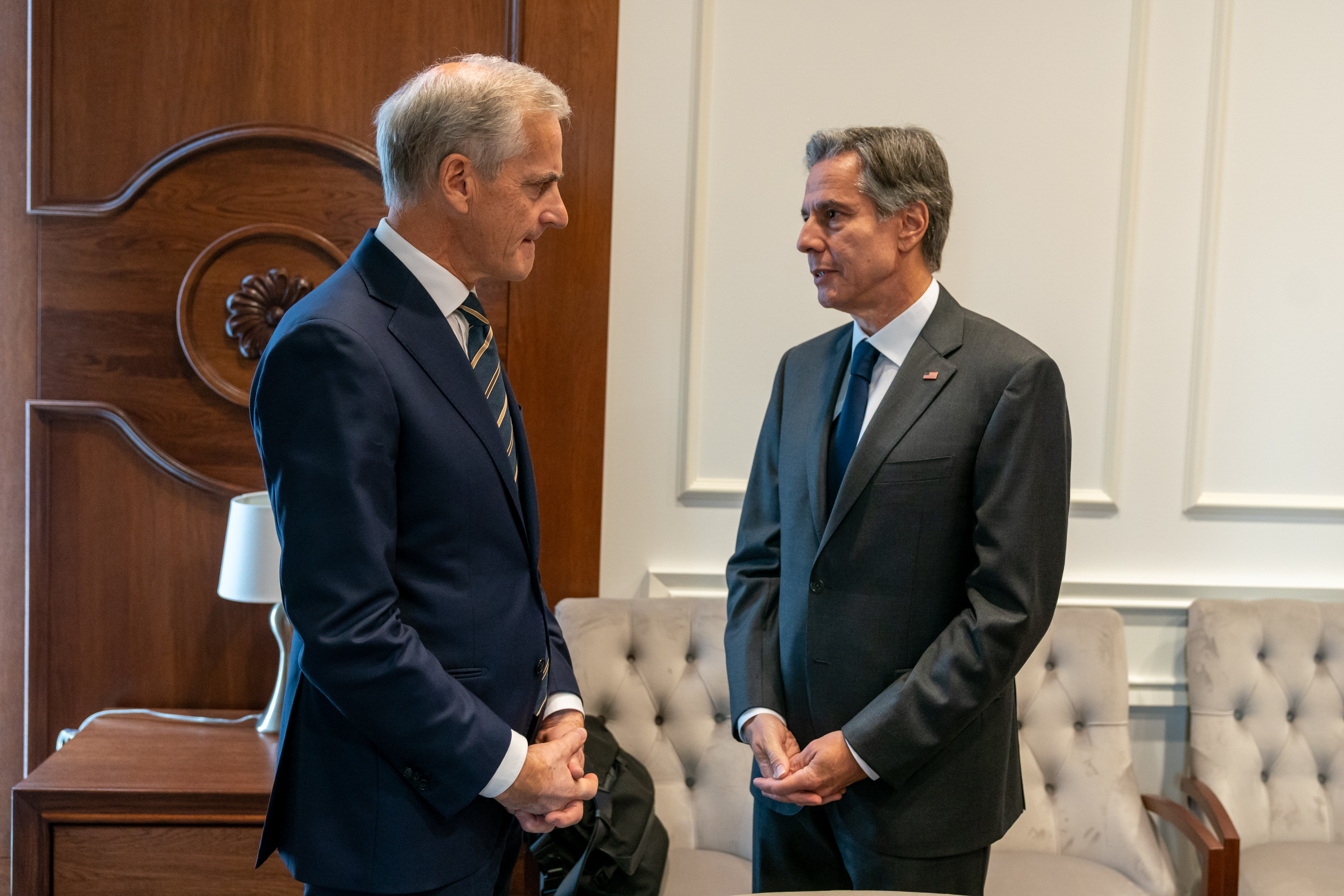
Støre (left) with US Secretary of State Antony Blinken in 2022

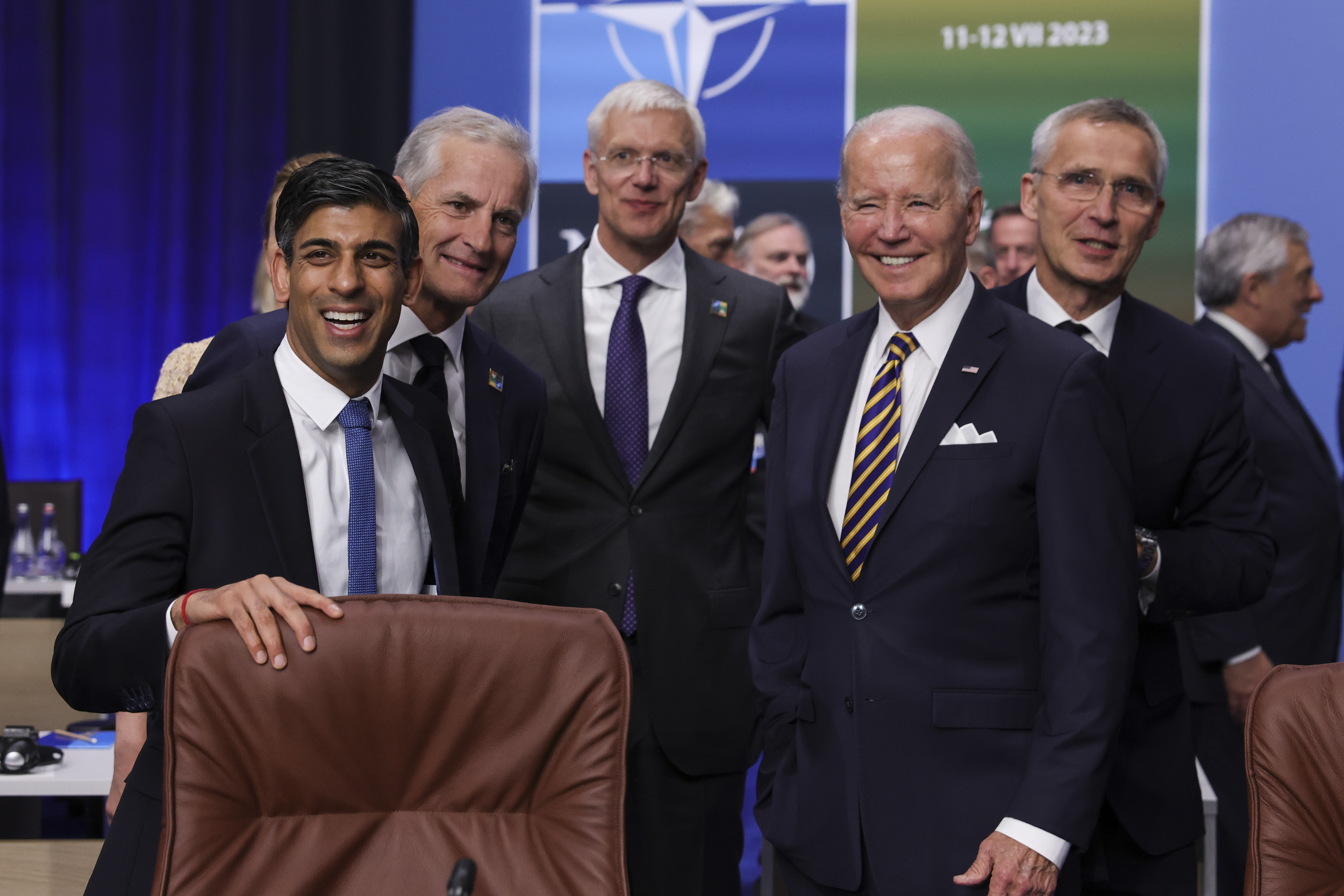
Støre with British Prime Minister Rishi Sunak, US President Joe Biden and NATO Secretary General Jens Stoltenberg at the 2023 Vilnius summit

Støre and his government announced that they would send observers to a summit about a nuclear ban in Vienna in early 2022. By doing this, Norway would become the only NATO country to do so. The action was notably praised by ICAN Norway, with coordinator Tove Widskjold saying that Norway would send important signals to allied countries that nuclear weapons are unacceptable. The Conservative Party parliamentary leader Trond Helleland cast doubt on the action, saying: "The Conservatives are very skeptical of this. Norway should not have any solitude in NATO in relation to this treaty. I assume that the new government intends to show solidarity with the commitments in the NATO membership". When asked if they face an explanation issue, Støre said: "No. When you are an observer, you follow the discussions that take place in one of the areas where disarmament is discussed. Norway has extensive experience in being a driving force in nuclear disarmament."

==== Asia ====
Støre visited China in September 2024 to mark 70 years of diplomatic relations between Norway and China. He also met with President Xi Jinping and premier Li Qiang. He highlighted that China is important partner in trade, artificial intelligence and climate change, but also noted that it was important to secure Norwegian interests. He also showed doubts about reiterating the importance of human rights violations, citing when China cut diplomatic ties back in 2010, further arguing that restarting the countries' former relationship would be challenging.

During a visit to China in July 2026, Støre called on China to use its influence over Russia to promote negotiations to end the Russo-Ukrainian War. He stated that China's close ties with Russia provided Beijing with an opportunity to encourage peace talks, while also asserting that the relationship limited China's economic and political cooperation with Europe.

==== Baltics ====
During a state visit by Lithuanian President Gitanas Nauseda in February 2023, Støre didn't rule out Nauseda's request for deploying Norwegian fighter jets in the country. Støre also remarked that a possible deployment would have to be discussed with other NATO countries who have stationed troops in Lithuania.

Alongside defence minister Bjørn Arild Gram, Støre announced in July during a visit to Norwegian troops in Lithuania, that their stay would be extended by a year through 2024.

==== Nordics ====
At a Nordic Council meeting in Copenhagen on 3 November 2021, Støre said that he wanted to adjust relations with Sweden following the COVID-19 pandemic, while also defending the decision of the previous government to close the border during the pandemic. Swedish politicians from the Christian Democrats and Moderate Party criticised the move, calling it "pandemic nationalism". Støre emphasised that people carry infection and it could appear in a line of people. He also stated that it was a difficult decision to close borders.

Støre called Turkish President Recep Tayyip Erdogan's opposition to Swedish and Finnish NATO membership "surprising". He further commented on Erdogan's claim that "Scandinavia is like a guest house for terrorist organisations", calling it a "completely baseless claim".

During his semi-annual speech in late June 2023, Støre condemned burning of the Quran and other holy books and flags, referring to the recent burning of the former in Sweden. He expressed that he thought of such actions as hate crime, but noted that it would ultimately be up to the courts and justice system to determine whether what expressions are within the boundaries of freedom of expression or not.

==== Africa ====
On 10 December 2021, Støre met with the South African president, Cyril Ramaphosa, digitally. Støre notably praised the country's alert about the omicron variant, and their openness about it. He described Ramaphosa's message in the meeting as "expressing solidarity and support" to countries without vaccine coverage. He also had a meeting with the Director-General of the World Health Organization, Tedros Adhanom Ghebreyesus, about the COVID-19 pandemic more generally.

==== Europe ====
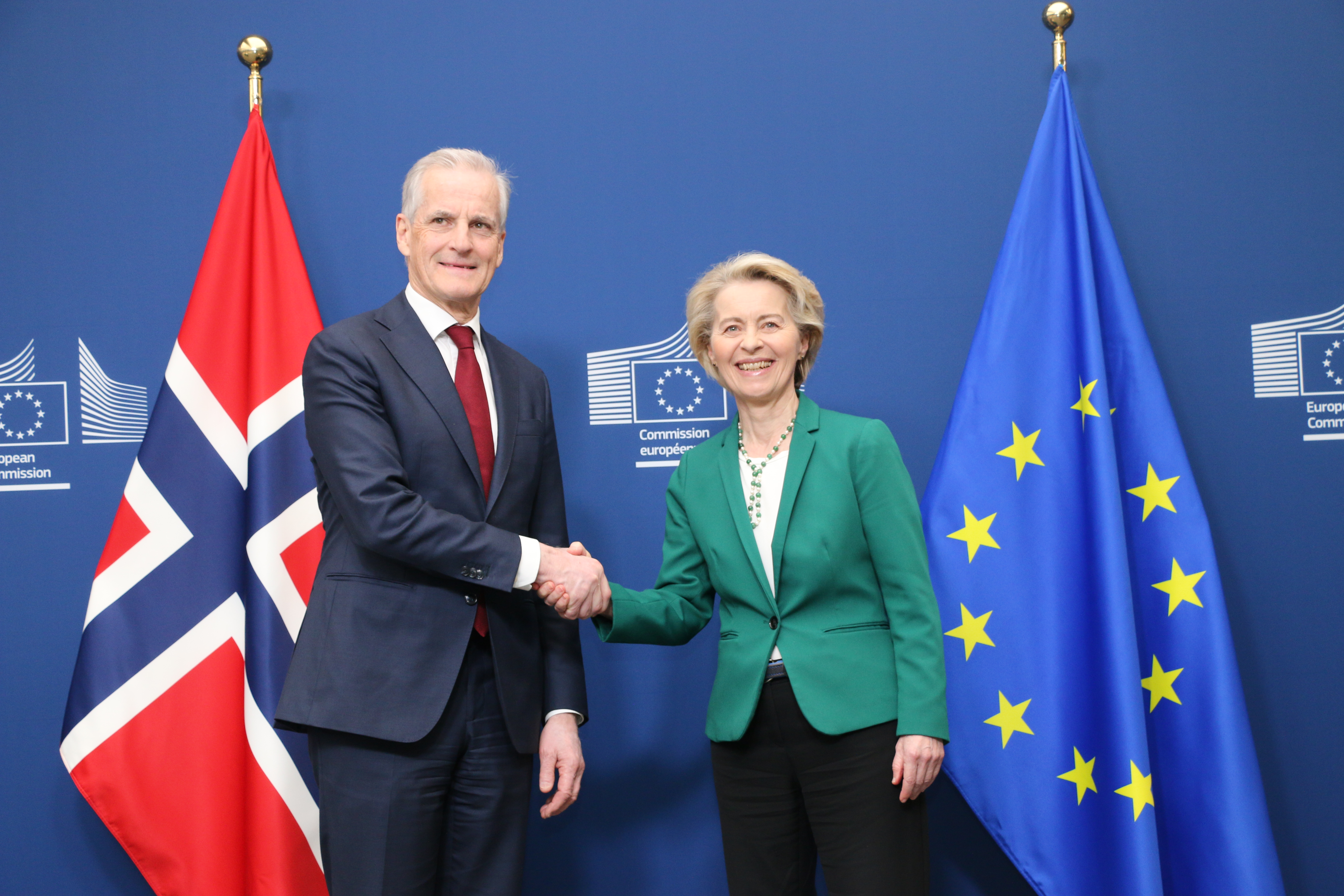
Støre with President of the European Commission Ursula von der Leyen in April 2025

Støre met with Russian foreign minister Sergei Lavrov on 26 October 2021. Støre stated that they had talked about cooperation in the north, and how to continue with it. He also said that they agreed to have good contact and work together to avoid tensions in the United Nations Security Council.

Støre attended the 2021 United Nations Climate Change Conference in Glasgow, where he gave a speech, saying: "The Petroleum Fund is the world's largest state owned fund, invested worldwide. Our goal is to make it the leading fund in responsible investments and in managing climate risk". He further said that the fund would base its ownership on investments from companies who commit themselves to net zero. He also stressed it was time to take the step forward.

Støre visited Berlin on 19 January 2022, where he met with German Chancellor Olaf Scholz. They discussed energy cooperation and the ongoing situation in Ukraine.

On 29 May 2022, marking international solidarity for Belarus, the Norwegian Ministry of Foreign Affairs announced that it would change the name it used for the country from Hviterussland to Belarus. Of the decision, Støre said: "We believe it is right to change the use of the name, in solidarity with the Belarusian democracy movement".

Støre attended the inaugural meeting of the European Political Community in Prague, Czech Republic, on 6 October, along with the leaders of 44 other countries.

The day after the Crocus City Hall attack, Støre issued his condemnation and also offered his condolences to the families of the victims.

==== Ukraine ====
Following the 2022 Ukraine cyberattack, Støre warned "we need to be more alert" and emphasised that Norway also had to be more alert to hybrid attacks and to consider them a threat to society. He said: "I am concerned that we as individuals and companies and institutions must be aware that this is part of our preparedness." He went on to say that the issue of cyber security would be looked at by the new Defence Commission, to be headed by former justice minister Knut Storberget.

Following the deployment of Russian troops to Eastern Ukraine, Støre expressed concerns about the situation and also condemned the actions by Russia. He also criticised Russian President Vladimir Putin's speech where Russia recognised the Donetsk and Luhansk people's republics as independent countries, and Sergei Lavrov's further comments.

On 27 February, Støre and members of his cabinet announced that Norway would be freezing the Government Pension Fund of Norway's investment in Russia. A process to pull the Oil Fund out of the country over time was also initiated.

On 31 March, Støre had an hour-long phone call with Putin after taking the initiative to do so with Nordic and European allies and the United States. He described the conversation as "possible to reach out" to Putin, and urged him to end the invasion of Ukraine. He also urged him to open humanitarian corridors in Mariupol and that the war required a negotiated solution.

Støre visited Kyiv on 1 July, where he met with Ukrainian President Volodymyr Zelenskyy, and announced that Norway would be contributing with 10 billion NOK in aid. The money would notably go to humanitarian aid, reconstruction and support to crucial infrastructure, such as schools and hospitals. Støre also visited the ruins of the city of Yahidne, which he described as "getting an insight into hell on earth".

On 30 September, Støre condemned the Russian annexation of Kherson Oblast, Zaporizhzhia Oblast, Donetsk Oblast and Luhansk Oblast. He also confirmed that Norway had accepted assistance from other allied countries to tighten security in the Norwegian sector. Regarding the annexations, he stated: "Putin has announced a few hours ago that Russia is incorporating four Ukrainian regions as part of Russia. The annexation of the four regions is without legitimacy. The so-called referendums were carried out under military occupation and are in violation of international law".

At a press conference on 20 October, accompanied by justice minister Emilie Enger Mehl and defence minister Bjørn Arild Gram, Støre warned that the war in Ukraine was reaching a new and dangerous phase. He also warned that the security situation in Europe had become more tense in the wake of the Nord Stream pipeline sabotage.

In early May 2023, he attended a summit in Helsinki, Finland, with Ukrainian President Volodymyr Zelenskyy and other Nordic leaders.

In February 2024, Støre announced that his government would provide 75 million NOK in support for Ukraine and stated that Norway would continue to support the country.

Støre was one of the participants at the European-led Ukraine peace summit in March 2025. Despite the American absence at the summit, he argued that the United States should take part in any peace negotiations and that they would be the guarantor for security as a foundation for a peace settlement in the war in Ukraine.

==== Americas ====
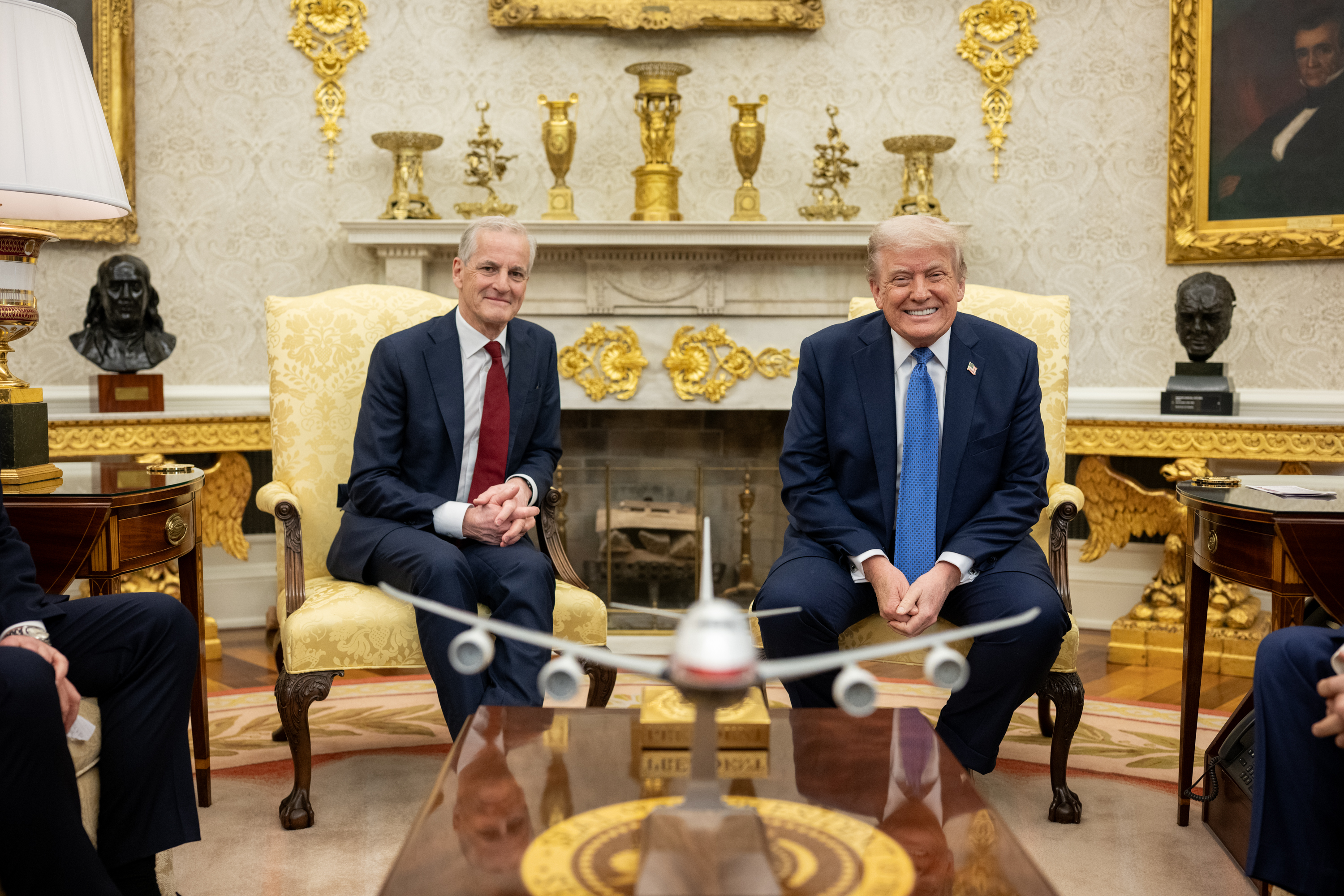
Støre with US President Donald Trump in April 2025

Following the overruling of Roe v. Wade by the Supreme Court of the United States, Støre and several other Norwegian politicians, including culture minister Anette Trettebergstuen and Conservative Party leader Erna Solberg, criticised the decision. Støre stated: "This is a serious step backwards for women's rights. The 1972 Supreme Court ruling helped secure the right to self-determined abortion in the United States. States can now enact legislation that in practice bans abortion or severely curtails the law, and it will affect women in those states and increase social inequalities". He said that decisions made in the United States would affect Europe and the rest of the world, while also calling for Norway to be alert.

On 12 August 2022, Støre and foreign minister Anniken Huitfeldt condemned the knife attack on British-Indian author Salman Rushdie. Støre said, "This is shocking news. My thoughts are with Rushdie and his loved ones, and I hope he is doing well. We still don't know anything about the motive for the attack, but it will in any case be read into the debate about religious criticism and freedom of expression, where Rushdie has been an important voice for decades, and has had to live with threats and police protection".

Støre visited Washington, DC in April 2025, accompanied by finance minister and former NATO Secretary General Jens Stoltenberg and ambassador Anniken Huitfeldt. He held discussions with President of the United States Donald Trump about Norway's role in the Arctic and the northern areas, the war in Ukraine, US–Norway relations and the 15% tariff on Norwegian exports to the US.

Støre was the recipient of the 2026 letter Dear Jonas, written by Donald Trump in response to the Greenland crisis, which was widely shared with world leaders and analysed.

==== Middle East ====
On 24 November 2021, after NRK journalists Halvor Ekeland and Lokman Ghorbani were detained in Qatar and released after 30 hours, Støre criticised the country, saying: "The arrest of NRK's journalists in Qatar is unacceptable. A free press is crucial to a functioning democracy". Qatari authorities claimed the journalists were trespassing on private property, and that they knowingly violated common law.

On 24 September 2022, Støre condemned the Iranian regime for its treatment of women and its hijab mandate in the wake of the death of Mahsa Amini; stating: "My deepest condolences to Mahsa Amini's family in Iran and her relatives in Norway. I am deeply concerned about women's rights in Iran and condemn the Iranian authorities' brutal enforcement of the hijab mandate".

Støre criticised FIFA President Gianni Infantino's response to criticism of the 2022 FIFA World Cup host nation, Qatar, saying: "I think this does not set the mood for a sports party. It shows how much is at stake, and how much he feels he has to defend. Having a football president who invites to a party by scolding large parts of the world is not a good start to a sporting event". He also expressed a waiting interest in 2022's edition, noting: "I don't want to rule out that I will see one game or another, but somehow I haven't familiarized myself with the match schedule. It is a slightly different commitment".

Following the start of the Gaza war, Støre expressed his condemnation and called for the conflict to end. He also iterated that Israel has the right to defend itself as well as encouraging de-escalation. On 10 November 2023, Støre stated that Israel's actions in the Gaza Strip violated international laws of war.

On 22 May 2024, Støre announced that Norway would be recognising Palestine as an independent country, joining Spain and Ireland in doing the same. The move received widespread support in parliament, while Israel decided to recall their ambassador to both Ireland and Norway as a result.

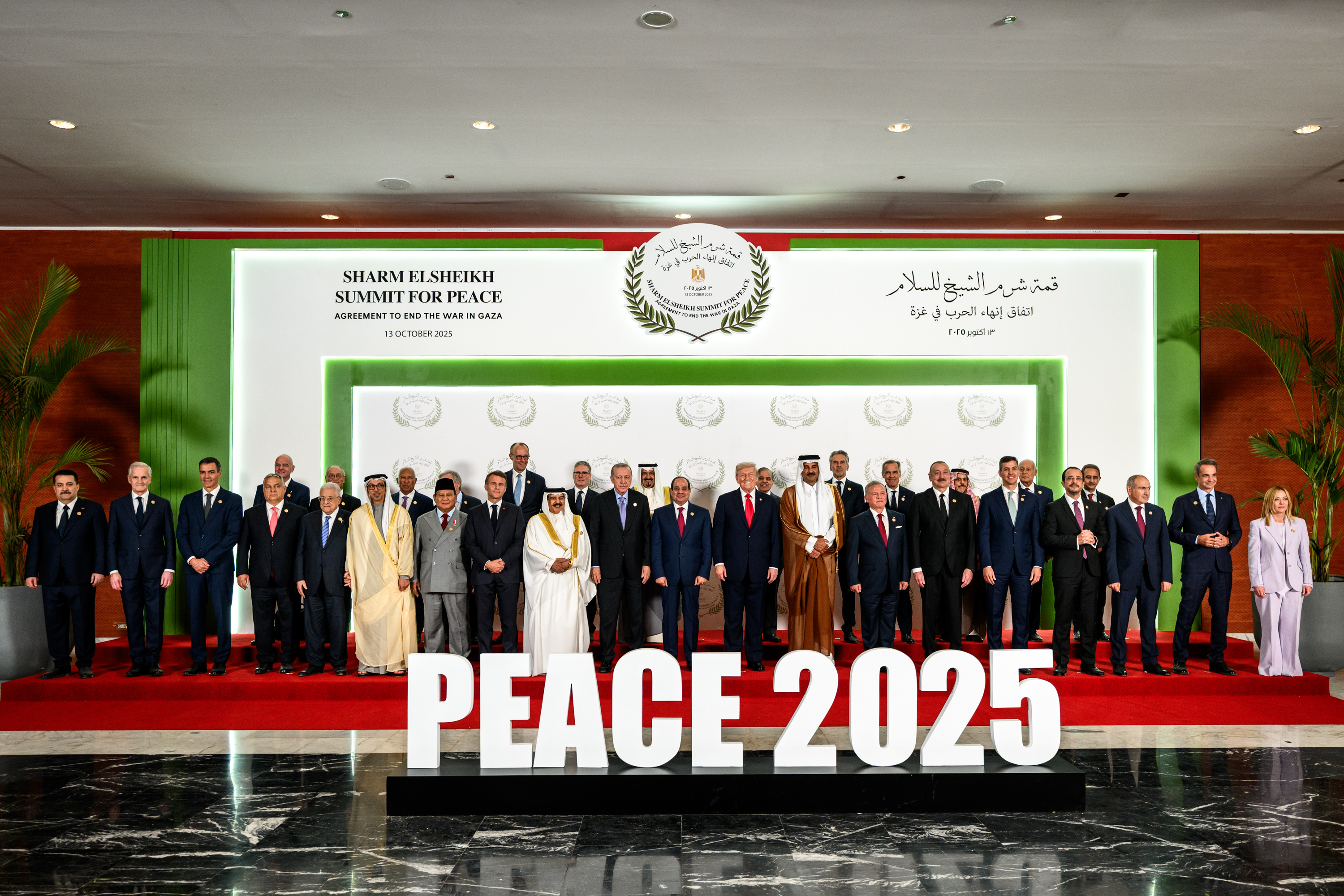
Støre at the Gaza peace summit in Sharm El Sheikh, Egypt, 13 October 2025

In October 2024, Støre called the proposed Israeli draft bills that would seek to ban the UNRWA from Israel "a direct catastrophe" that could affect vulnerable Palestinians. He further stated that Norway would be putting pressure on Israeli allies like the United States and Germany, but would also attempt to appeal to other countries as well.

In March 2025, Støre said in a statement that the renewed Israeli attacks on the Gaza Strip were "a great tragedy" for the people of Gaza.

Støre was among the attendees of the 2025 Gaza peace summit in Egypt and also expressed support for the peace plan put forward by US President Donald Trump. During the summit, he also met with Trump to discuss the plan itself and Ukraine, and also met with other world leaders present during the summit.

== Political positions ==
Like his political mentors Gro Harlem Brundtland and Jens Stoltenberg, Støre is associated with the business-friendly right-leaning faction of the Labour Party.

=== Foreign policy ===
==== Middle East ====
During Støre's tenure as Foreign Minister, Norway was one of the first governments of the Western world to recognise the Palestinian government. In 2011 it became known that Støre had been in direct contact with Hamas leader Khaled Meshaal. Former Conservative Prime Minister Kåre Willoch has also emphasized that dialogue with Hamas is important. Støre has hailed the humanitarian work of Mads Gilbert and Erik Fosse in the Gaza Strip, and both Støre and former Conservative Prime Minister Kåre Willoch wrote endorsements for their book Eyes in Gaza on the Gaza War. Støre wrote that Gilbert and Fosse "have shown great courage and acted in accordance with the best medical traditions, namely by helping the oppressed". Støre has condemned Israeli occupation of Palestinian land as contrary to international law. In 2015, Støre said a Labour government would recognise the State of Palestine.

==== China ====
In a 2015 BBC interview, Støre was criticized by Geir Lundestad, the Nobel Prize Committee Secretary, for trying to dissuade the Norwegian Nobel Committee from awarding the prize to Chinese dissident Liu Xiaobo in 2010, for fear it would strain Norway's business relationship with Beijing. The Nobel committee, chaired by former prime minister Thorbjørn Jagland, ignored the warnings and honored Liu. Subsequently, Støre ruled out apologising to China over the award.

==== Libya ====
As foreign minister, Støre oversaw Norway's participation in the 2011 NATO-led military intervention in Libya. Norway's participation in the intervention was controversial on the far–left, and the communist party Red reported him to the police for alleged war crimes.

== Other activities ==
He is a member of the board of trustees for the International Crisis Group.

Støre is a supporter of the English Premier League club Leeds United.

== See also ==
- Jens Stoltenberg
- List of current heads of state and government
- List of heads of the executive by approval rating

Political offices
Preceded by Jan Petersen	Minister of Foreign Affairs; 2005–2012	Succeeded by Espen Barth Eide
Preceded by Anne-Grete Strøm-Erichsen	Minister of Health and Care Services; 2012–2013	Succeeded by Bent Høie
Preceded by Jens Stoltenberg	Leader of the Opposition; 2014–2021	Succeeded by Erna Solberg
Preceded by Erna Solberg	Prime Minister of Norway; 2021–present	Incumbent
Party political offices
Preceded by Jens Stoltenberg	Leader of the Labour Party; 2014–present	Incumbent
Preceded by Jens Stoltenberg	Parliamentary Leader of the Labour Party; 2014–2021	Succeeded by Rigmor Aasrud
Non-profit organization positions
Preceded by Jan Egeland	Secretary General of the Norwegian Red Cross; 2003–2005	Succeeded by Trygve Nordby
