= Einar Olsen (editor) =

Norwegian newspaper editor (1936–2025)

Einar Olsen (25 April 1936 – 11 June 2025) was a Norwegian newspaper editor.

== Life and career ==
Olsen was born in Kragerø on 25 April 1936. He was a journalist in the Norwegian News Agency from 1957 to 1960 and in the Labour Movement Press Office from 1960 to 1965. He then became editor-in-chief in Rogalands Avis from 1965 to 1970, Vestfold Arbeiderblad from 1971 to 1973 and Arbeiderbladet from 1974 to 1975. In 1989 he became the editor-in-chief of the Norwegian News Agency.

Olsen died on 11 June 2025, at the age of 89.

Media offices
Preceded by Reidar Hirsti	Chief editor of Arbeiderbladet; 1974–1975	Succeeded by Per Brunvand
