= Kristin Stoltenberg =

Norwegian newspaper editor and media executive (born 1969)

- Born: 14 July 1969 (age 57); Harstad, Norway
- Education: Møre og Romsdal regional college
- Occupations: Newspaper editor, media executive

Kristin Stoltenberg (born 14 July 1969) is a Norwegian newspaper editor and media executive. A former chief editor of Nordstrands Blad and Avisa Oslo, she has been chief executive of Watch Media Norway since 2023.

== Career ==
Born in Harstad on 14 July 1969, Stoltenberg graduated as journalist from the Møre og Romsdal regional college in 1992, and minored in history from the University of Oslo in 1993.

She was a journalist for the newspaper Vårt Land from 1992 to 1994, and was assigned with the newspaper Aftenposten and the media group Schibsted from 1995 to 2016. From 2016 to 2019 she worked for the SOS Children's Villages. From 2019 to 2022 she was chief editor of the local newspaper Nordstrands Blad.

In 2022 she was appointed chief editor of the newspaper Avisa Oslo. In 2023 she was succeeded as editor of Avisa Oslo by Eirik Hoff Lysholm, and was appointed chief executive of the online niche newspaper Watch Media Norway, owned by JP/Politikens Hus.
