= Frode Jacobsen (politician) =

Norwegian politician (born 1968)

- Born: 5 August 1968 (age 57)
- Occupation: Politician
- Political party: Labour Party
- Father: Arvid Jacobsen

Frode Jacobsen (born 5 August 1968) is a Norwegian politician.

He was elected deputy representative to the Storting from the constituency of Oslo for the period 2021–2025, for the Labour Party. He replaced Jonas Gahr Støre in the Storting from 2021 while Støre is prime minister.

Jacobsen is a son of newspaper editor Arvid Jacobsen.
