= Storvik =

Storvik may refer to:

== People ==
- Kaia Storvik (born 1976), Norwegian journalist, former newspaper editor and politician
- Kenneth Storvik (born 1972), Norwegian football midfielder
- Kjell Storvik (born 1930), Norwegian economist and former Governor of the Central Bank of Norway

== Places ==
- Storvik, Norway, a village in Gildeskål Municipality in Nordland county, Norway
- Storvik, Sweden, a locality
