= Kaia Storvik =

Norwegian journalist and newspaper editor

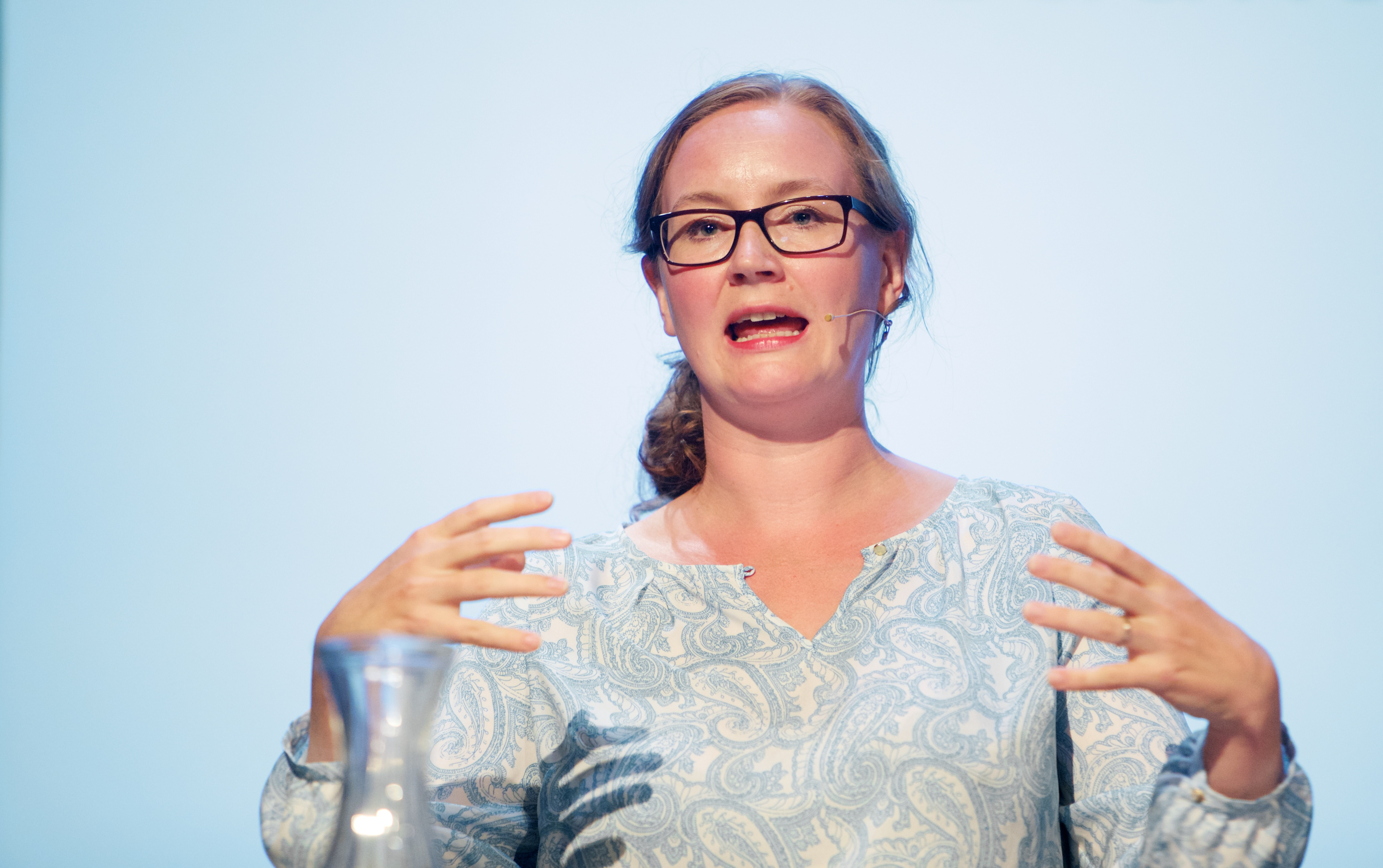
- Kaia Storvik, 2013
- Born: 10 October 1976 (age 48); Oslo, Norway
- Occupation(s): Journalist, newspaper editor and politician

Kaia Storvik (born 10 October 1976) is a Norwegian journalist, former newspaper editor and politician.

== Biography ==
Storvik was born in Oslo on 10 October 1976.

She has worked for several newspapers, including Vårt Land, Dagbladet, Dagens Næringsliv and Dagsavisen. She was chief editor of Dagsavisen from 2010 to 2014, jointly with Arne Strand, until Eirik Hoff Lysholm took over as editor from 2014.

From 2014 she was assigned as deputy leader of the think tank Agenda.
