= Erik Tumyr =

Erik Tumyr (27 November 1962 – 16 April 2011) was a Norwegian journalist.

He was the son of journalist, newspaper editor and politician Arne Tumyr. He started his career in Nybrott in 1983, where his father had been editor-in-chief since 1970. He then worked for Rjukan Arbeiderblad and Dagbladet Sørlandet. In 1988 he was hired in Osloavisen, and as it went defunct after a short time, he went on to Verdens Gang. At the advent of 2001 he started in Dagens Næringsliv, and in 2002 he won a SKUP Award for revealing that billionaire Kjell Inge Røkke owned and steered a yacht without the appropriate seafaring certificate. Tumyr worked in gossip magazine Se og Hør from 2003, later in Kapital.

He wrote two books, the first with Frank Gander about the Orderud case. Titled Da døden kom til Orderud, it was released in 2002. In 2005 he published a memoir book named Journalistjævler.

He had one daughter. He sustained a serious head trauma in the summer of 2010, was in a coma for some time before recovering, but he died in April 2011.
