= Carsten Bleness =

Norwegian newspaper editor

Carsten Bleness (born 22 July 1958) is a Norwegian newspaper editor.

He was born in Oslo as a son of Magne Bleness. He took the examen artium in 1977 and worked as a sailor, then manual laborer at Jøtul from 1980 to 1982. He took education as a Chief Mate and served as such for two years, and then returned to manual labor at Standard Telefon og Kabelfabrik until 1985.

From 1985 to 1987 he led the radio station Radio Klassekampen. He worked in the Norwegian Broadcasting Corporation from 1988 to 1992, and in Aftenposten from 1992 to 2005. He was the newspaper's correspondent in London for a period. In 2005 he was hired as the editor-in-chief of the newspaper Dagsavisen. He resigned in 2009 amid poor economic results, and was succeeded by Arne Strand as acting editor. In September 2010 he became editor-in-chief of Hamar Arbeiderblad.

Media offices
Preceded by Arne Strand (acting)	Chief editor of Dagsavisen; 2005-2009	Succeeded by Arne Strand (acting)
