= Odd Lien =

Norwegian politician (1915–2002)

Odd Lien (born 16 August 1915 in Kristiania, died 24 November 2002) was a Norwegian newspaper editor and politician for the Labour Party.

He was elected to the Norwegian Parliament from Vest-Agder in 1973, and was re-elected on one occasion. He had previously served as a deputy representative during the term 1965–1969.

On the local level he was a member of the executive committee of Halden municipal council from 1945 to 1947, and later of Kristiansand city council from 1951 to 1964 and 1971 to 1975. From 1967 to 1971 he was also a member of Vest-Agder county council. He chaired the local party chapter from 1975 to 1977. He chaired the latter group from 1978 to 1985. He chaired the friendship association Friends of Israel in the Norwegian Labour Movement (Norwegian: Venner av Israel i Norsk Arbeiderbevegelse).

Outside politics he worked at a shoe factory in Halden from 1930 to 1940. During the German occupation of Norway he distributed illegal flyers and helped escapees, but was imprisoned. After the war he embarked on a career in journalism. He was a journalist in Halden Arbeiderblad from 1945 to 1947 and editor-in-chief of Rana Blad from 1947 to 1949. In 1949 he was hired as a journalist in Sørlandet, later being promoted to chief editor, a position he held from 1956 to 1977.
