= Dagsavisen =

Norwegian newspaper

- Type: Daily newspaper
- Format: Tabloid (1990–present)
- Owner(s): Mentor Media (91.01%), Stiftelsen Dagsavisen (8.99%)
- Editor: Eirik Hoff Lysholm
- Founded: 1884
- Political alignment: Labour (1887–1990s); Independent (1999–)
- Headquarters: Oslo, Norway
- Circulation: 20,497 (2015)
- ISSN: 1503-2892 (print); 1891-1706 (web)
- Website: www.dagsavisen.no

Dagsavisen is a daily newspaper published in Oslo, Norway. The former party organ of the Norwegian Labour Party, the ties loosened over time from 1975 to 1999. It has borne several names, and was called Arbeiderbladet from 1923 to 1997. Eirik Hoff Lysholm is editor-in-chief. The newspaper depends on economic support from the Norwegian Government.

== History ==
Dagsavisen was established by Christian Holtermann Knudsen in 1884 under the name Vort Arbeide ('Our Work' in archaic Riksmål), and was affiliated with the trade union center Fagforeningernes Centralkomité. Holtermann Knudsen also had to establish his own printing press since the existing printing presses did not want to be affiliated with a labourers’ newspaper. The fledgling project was marred by economic problems, and the burden of writing, editing, and printing lay chiefly on Knudsen. In 1885 the newly founded association Socialdemokratisk Forening formally took over the newspaper. The name was changed from Vort Arbeide to Social-Demokraten ('The Social Democrat') in 1886. The next year, the Norwegian Labour Party was founded, and Social-Demokraten became its official party organ. Carl Jeppesen took over as editor-in-chief. In 1894 the newspaper was published on a daily basis, and in 1904 the financial balance was positive.

Around 1920 there were tensions in the Labour Party. The radical wing spearheaded by Martin Tranmæl and Kyrre Grepp had assumed control over the party at the 1918 national convention. The party aligned itself with the Comintern. As a result, a moderate wing broke out in 1921 to form the Social Democratic Labour Party. Nonetheless, Social-Demokraten remained affiliated with the Labour Party, as Martin Tranmæl assumed the editorship in 1921. In 1923, the same year as the Labour Party renounced the Comintern and the communist wing broke away, Social-Demokraten changed its name to Arbeiderbladet (lit. 'The Worker Paper') in 1923. The factionalism was contrary to the goal of Christian Holtermann Knudsen, who wanted to unite the fledgling labour movement.

In 1940, upon the German invasion and subsequent occupation of Norway, Arbeiderbladet was stopped by the Nazi authorities. The only legal party in Norway during the occupation, Nasjonal Samling, evicted Arbeiderbladet from its premises, using it as headquarters for its party organ Fritt Folk. Arbeiderbladet's printing press was also utilized by Fritt Folk. Only in 1945, upon the liberation of Norway, did Arbeiderbladet resume publication.

Olav Larssen, imprisoned during the occupation, was promoted from news editor as he succeeded Martin Tranmæl as editor-in-chief in 1949. At that time, the editor-in-chief was elected by the national convention of the Labour Party, and the editor-in-chief was also an ex officio member of the party's central committee. This practice continued with editors-in-chief Reidar Hirsti and Einar Olsen, until abolished in 1975. From this point, the board of directors appointed the editor-in-chief.

In 1974, Tor and Trygve Bratteli, aided by Jens Chr. Hauge, forced Hirsti out of his job.

Arbeiderbladet was formally owned by the Labour Party until 1991, when a separate, but affiliated, entity Norsk Arbeiderpresse took over. The labour-inspired name Arbeiderbladet was changed in 1997, to the neutral Dagsavisen ('The Daily Newspaper'). In 1999 a step towards independence was taken, as the newspaper was published by the public company Dagsavisen AS, which is in turn was owned 100% by the foundation Stiftelsen Dagsavisen. As of 2016, this foundation only owns 9% of the shares of Dagsavisen directly, with the remaining 91% of the paper owned by Mentor Medier AS. This company also owns the Christian daily Vårt Land, and is partly owned by Christian groups such as Normisjon, Blå Kors and the Norwegian Lutheran Mission. The largest owner is Mushom Invest (10%). Stiftelsen Dagsavisen controls 6% of the shares in Mentor Medier AS.

The newspaper depends on economic support from the Norwegian Government.

== Publishing ==
The newspaper changed to tabloid format in 1990, having used the Berliner format since 1976. In 1997 it launched its Internet version, and also started publishing on Sundays. The Sunday edition was discontinued in 2007 due to economic problems. It is widely accepted that Dagsavisen would face drastic problems if the distinctively Norwegian press support were to cease.

Dagsavisen is published six days a week.

Dagsavisen had a circulation of 28,337 in 2009, making it the fifth largest Oslo-based newspaper, after Verdens Gang, Aftenposten, Aften (now discontinued), Dagbladet and Dagens Næringsliv. It is also smaller than the regional and local newspapers Bergens Tidende, Adresseavisen, Stavanger Aftenblad, Fædrelandsvennen, Drammens Tidende, Romerikes Blad, Sunnmørsposten and Haugesunds Avis.

Its slogan is "Nyheter med mening" ('Meaningful news').

== Editors-in-chief ==
Editors-in-chief of the newspaper:

- 1884–1886: Christian Holtermann Knudsen
- 1887–1891: Carl Jeppesen
- 1892–1893: Christian Holtermann Knudsen
- 1894–1897: Oscar Nissen
- 1898–1900: Ludvig Meyer
- 1900–1903: Anders Buen
- 1903–1906: Olav Kringen
- 1906–1912: Carl Jeppesen
- 1912–1918: Jacob Vidnes
- 1918–1921: Olaf Scheflo
- 1921–1940: Martin Tranmæl
- 1940–1945: stopped
- 1945–1949: Martin Tranmæl
- 1949–1963: Olav Larssen
- 1963–1974: Reidar Hirsti
- 1974–1975: Einar Olsen
- 1975–1991: Per Brunvand
- 1991–1994: Arvid Jacobsen
- 1995–2000: Steinar Hansson
- 2001–2004: Hilde Haugsgjerd
- 2005–2009: Carsten Bleness
- 2009-2013: Arne Strand (At the time Strand left the position, the newspaper had two editors in chief)
- 2010-2014: Kaia Storvik (She held the position alone since 2013.)
- 2014- : Eirik Hoff Lysholm

== Circulation ==
Source after 1950: The Norwegian Media Businesses' Association, Mediebedriftenes Landsforening.

- 1884: 300
- 1892: 1200
- 1894: 3000
- 1904: 6000
- 1912: 15000
- 1914: 23000
- 1918: 40000
- 1921: 85000
- 1923: 35000
- 1927: 27000
- 1930: 34000
- 1934: 48000
- 1937: 59359
- 1938: 58735
- 1939: 58681
- ---
- 1945: 80000
- 1947: 56877
- 1950: 62845
- 1951: 64228
- 1952: 65635
- 1953: 64524
- 1954: 65159
- 1955: 65201
- 1956: 70087
- 1957: 71299
- 1958: 68112
- 1959: 66271
- 1960: 67494
- 1961: 67684
- 1962: 67894
- 1963: 69182
- 1964: 67254
- 1965: 68278
- 1966: 67675
- 1967: 70714
- 1968: 71267
- 1969: 74091
- 1970: 73217
- 1971: 75372
- 1972: 69159
- 1973: 64155
- 1974: 61931
- 1975: 62211
- 1976: 60380
- 1977: 60152
- 1978: 60091
- 1979: 59211
- 1980: 55125
- 1981: 52596
- 1982: 52000
- 1983: 52500
- 1984: 56000
- 1985: 57000
- 1986: 58000
- 1987: 60737
- 1988: 57015
- 1989: 55707
- 1990: 51786
- 1991: 47016
- 1992: 44046
- 1993: 43528
- 1994: 42848
- 1995: 42870
- 1996: 42139
- 1997: 40771
- 1998: 43792
- 1999: 40349
- 2000: 38239
- 2001: 35413
- 2002: 33816
- 2003: 32706
- 2004: 32920
- 2005: 33830
- 2006: 32380
- 2007: 31403
- 2008: 29041
- 2009: 28337
- 2014: 21945
- 2015: 20497

Circulation: Arbeiderbladet / Dagsavisen 1950 - 2009.

== See also ==
- Moss Dagblad
