= Per Brunvand =

Norwegian newspaper editor

Per Brunvand (11 May 1937 – 29 October 2015) was a Norwegian newspaper editor.

He was born in Kristiansand as the son of Olav Brunvand. He worked as a journalist from 1957, in Arbeidernes Pressekontor, Fremtiden and Arbeiderbladet. From 1970 to 1975 he was the editor-in-chief of Rogalands Avis, and from 1975 to 1991 he held the same position in Arbeiderbladet. In 1992 he was hired as a press counsellor at the Norwegian embassy in Finland. He died in 2015.

Media offices
Preceded by Einar Olsen	Chief editor of Arbeiderbladet; 1975–1991	Succeeded by Arvid Jacobsen
