= Arvid Jacobsen =

Norwegian newspaper editor

- Born: October 11, 1938
- Died: June 25, 2014 (aged 75)
- Occupation: Newspaper editor
- Years active: 1967–2003
- Employer(s): A-pressen, Arbeiderbladet, Norwegian Bar Association
- Known for: Editor-in-chief of Arbeiderbladet (1991–1994)

Arvid Jacobsen (11 October 1938 – 25 June 2014) was a Norwegian newspaper editor.

He spent most of his career in the Labour press, as journalist in Arbeiderbladet from 1967 to 1977, editor-in-chief in A-pressens Oslo-redaksjon from 1977 to 1990 and editor-in-chief of Arbeiderbladet from 1991 to 1994. From 1994 to 2003 he was the director of information in the Norwegian Bar Association. He died in June 2014.

Media offices
Preceded by Per Brunvand	Chief editor of Arbeiderbladet; 1991–1994	Succeeded by Steinar Hansson
