= Avisa Oslo =

Online local newspaper in Norway

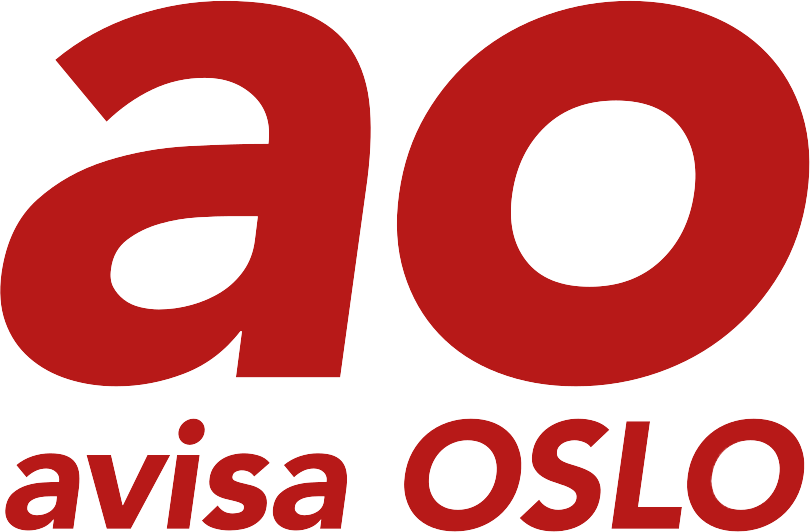
- Type: Online local newspaper
- Owner: Amedia
- Editor-in-chief: Eirik Hoff Lysholm
- Founded: 30 November 2020
- Language: Norwegian
- Headquarters: Oslo
- Country: Norway
- Website: ao

Avisa Oslo, stylized as ao, is an online newspaper based in Oslo, Norway, which was started in 2020. It is one of the publications owned by Amedia AS.

== History and profile ==
Avisa Oslo was established by Amedia and was first published on 30 November 2020. It has no print edition. Magne Storedal was its first editor-in-chief who was succeeded by Kristin Stoltenberg in September 2022. Storedal was removed from the post in early September 2022 due to lower levels of subscription rates. Stoltenberg's tenure as editor-in-chief only lasted until August 2023 when she left the paper. She was replaced by Eirik Hoff Lysholm as editor-in-chief of the paper who assumed the post on 9 October 2023.

Avisa Oslo features news reports and based in Oslo. It is a subscription newspaper, although a great deal of the content is openly available to everyone.

As of Autumn 2023 Avisa Oslo had 9,000 subscribers.
