= Gunnar Janson =

Norwegian sculptor (1901–1983)

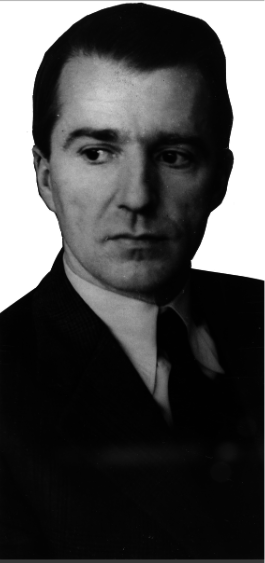
- Janson c.1930
- Born: 1 September 1901; Levanger, Norway
- Died: 11 June 1983 (aged 81)
- Occupation: sculptor
- Children: Mette Janson; Alfred Janson

Gunnar Tidemand Janson (1 September 1901 – 11 June 1983) was a Norwegian sculptor. He was born in Levanger, and was the father of journalist Mette Janson and composer Alfred Janson. Among his works are sculptures of Hans E. Kinck, Arne Garborg, Tarjei Vesaas, Dagfin Werenskiold and Ingeborg Refling Hagen. From 1939 a miniature version of his sculpture Spydkasteren (originally from 1927) was used as a statuette awarded for all-round proficiency in sports. His bronze sculpture Nasjonalmonument for krigens ofre was unveiled at Akershus Fortress in 1970. He was Chairman of the Board of Directors of Oslo House of Artists.
