= Marit Slagsvold =

Norwegian minister and sociologist (born 1962)

Marit Slagsvold (born 20 May 1962) is a Norwegian minister in the Church of Norway, sociologist, author and researcher. She is the wife of Jonas Gahr Støre, the Prime Minister of Norway.

== Career ==
Slagsvold earned her magister degree (equal to a PhD in Anglophone countries) in sociology at the University of Oslo in 1991 with a dissertation titled Nyetableringer og nettverk. She was a civil servant in the Ministry of Children and Families from 1991 to 2003, and then became a researcher at Oslo University College where she worked on research on social inclusion. She has published three books on friendship, young people's grief particularly after the loss of a close relative, and social relations.

Shortly after the 2021 Norwegian parliamentary election it was reported that she would be ordained as a minister in the Lutheran state church of Norway, the Church of Norway, by the Bishop of Oslo Kari Veiteberg, on 19 September 2021. She completed studies in theology at MF Norwegian School of Theology, Religion and Society in 2020. Since January 2021 she has worked as a minister in Uranienborg parish.

== Personal life ==
Marit Slagsvold grew up in Oslo and is the daughter of professor of dentistry Olav Kristoffer Slagsvold and Britt (Bitten) Berg-Pettersen. Her maternal grandfather Carl Berg-Pettersen owned the shipyard company Narvik Mekaniske Verksted in Narvik. She married Jonas Gahr Støre in Flosta Church in 1988. They have three sons, who attended Oslo Waldorf School. Her paternal family hails from the farm Slagsvold in Hedmark, and she is a second cousin once removed of the leader of the Centre Party, Trygve Slagsvold Vedum.

== Books ==
- Jeg blir til i møte med deg: en bok om relasjoner. Cappelen Damm, 2016.
- Ung sorg. Aschehoug 2008.
- Venner for harde livet: skråblikk på moderne vennskap. Aschehoug 2003.
