= Alfred Janson =

Norwegian pianist and composer (1937–2019)

- Born: 10 March 1937; Oslo, Norway
- Died: 19 May 2019 (aged 82)
- Occupations: Pianist and composer
- Spouses: Grynet Molvig; Berit Gustavsen (m. 1987)
- Father: Gunnar Janson
- Relatives: Mette Janson (sister); Finn Gustavsen (father-in-law)
- Awards: Gaudeamus International Composers Award (1966); Edvardprisen (2009); Gammleng Award (2010)

Alfred Janson (10 March 1937 – 19 May 2019) was a Norwegian pianist and composer. He was born in Oslo as the son of sculptor Gunnar Janson and pianist Margrethe Gleditsch, and was brother of journalist Mette Janson. He was first married to actress and singer Grynet Molvig and later to Berit Gustavsen. He made his piano debut in 1962. Among his early compositions is the piano piece November from 1962 and the orchestral Vuggesang from 1963. He composed the ballet Mot solen for the Bergen International Festival in 1969, and in 1991 he was the festival's principal composer.

== Career ==
A number of Janson’s works bear the mark of his jazz background, and several of his earliest compositions are written for a jazz line-up, including Patrice Lumumba (1961) for piano, bass, and drums. From 1962 onwards, Janson would gradually focus more on notated music and gained recognition with works such as November (1962) for piano and Vuggesang for 48 strykere og sopran (1963). 1966 saw his orchestral work Konstruksjon og hymne winning the prize for best non-Dutch work at the Bilhoven Festival. The same year also saw Janson’s international breakthrough at the ISCM World Music Days with the work Kanon for chamber orchestra and audio tape. Other major Janson works include the ballet Mot Solen (1969), the opera A Mountain Fairytale (1972), Interlude for violin and orchestra (1975), Interlude for orchestra (1985), National Hymn (1988), Livsfrise for cello, choir and orchestra (1999) and En bibelhistorie for actor and 15 musicians. In 1991, he was the composer in residence at the Bergen International Festival as well as the Oslo Chamber Music Festival. For the latter work, Janson was bestowed with the 2008 Edvard Prize.

One of Janson’s most frequently performed works is Sonnet No 76 for choir and solo voice (2000). The work has been recorded for a number of releases including The Norwegian Soloists’ Choir (2006), which commissioned it, as well as NOVA Chamber Choir. 2014 saw Tine Thing Helseth performing Janson’s trumpet concerto Variations over Variations on a Norwegian folk tune, a work that has its basis in Edvard Grieg’s work opus 24, Ballad in g-minor.

Political themes have often served as an inspirational source for Janson, and he is one of the few Norwegian composers who has had a demonstration held against a performance of one of his works, Interlude for orchestra og accordeon, a work written as a salute to Arne Treholt, who was sentenced to life imprisonment for espionage for the Soviet Union in a trial in 1985. In the more humorous-political genre, Valse Triste marks a milestone – and is viewed as a critical collage of early 1970s Norwegian cultural debate. More recent works with a clear political trait include 2003’s A Bagdad Blues (not for Blair, not for Bush) which Janson wrote in protest against the Operation Iraqi Freedom invasion of Iraq.

== Awards ==
Janson was the recipient of a number of prizes and awards bestowed to him on grounds of his career as a composer and performer. He was awarded the 1988 Lindeman Prize, the 2010 Gammleng Award as well as the 2008 Edvard Prize. In late-2016, he was bestowed with the Arne Nordheim Composer's Prize.

== Death ==
Janson died on 19 May 2019.

== Production ==
=== Selected works ===
- November for piano (1962)
- Konstruksjon og hymne for orchestra (1963)
- Vuggesang for 48 strykere og sopran (1963)
- Canon for chamber orchestra and two audio tapes (1965)
- Tema for choir, organ, percussion and piano (1966)
- Nocturne for choir, two cellos, two percussionists and harp (tekst: F. Nietzsche) (1967)
- Mot solen, ballett (1969)
- Valse triste for jazz quartet and audio tape (1970)
- Et fjelleventyr, opera (libretto: A. Bye and Janson) (1972)
- Forspill, concerto for violin and orchestra (1975)
- Tre dikt by Ebba Lindqvist for mixed choir (1975–80)
- String Quartet (1976–78)
- Hymne til Josef for vocals and piano (lyrics: I. Hagerup) (1977)
- Vinger for mixed choir and jazz ensemble (1983)
- Mellomspill for orchestra (1985)
- Nasjonalsang for trumpet, trombone, orchestra and audio tape (1988)
- Tarantella for flute, melodica, alt saxophone, percussion, violin, cello (1989–90)
- Diafoni for 4 band groups, 4 percussionists, signal corps and audio tape (sm.m. K. Kolberg og R. Wallin) (1990)
- Sarabande for double choir, 2 horns, 2 percussion groups, 2 violins, 2 cellos and organ (lyrics: E. Dickinson) (1995)
- Norsk dans – Med takk til Rikard Nordraak for cornet and strings (1996)
- Livsfrise for cello, mixed choir and orchestra (1999)
- Norsk dans rundt gullkalven for trumpet, tuba, drums and accordion (2000)
- Passacaglia vendetta for large jazz band, strings, solo trumpet and accordion (2000)
- Sonnet no. 76 for choir and baritone solo (lyrics: W. Shakespeare), (2000)
- Spill for violin, accordion and orchestra (2001)
- En bibelhistorie (2006)
- Rosa : A sort of klezmer music (2007)
- 9 skisser fra ingenmannsland (2010)
- Blåsekvintett (2015)

=== Discography ===
- Rosemalt Sound (1967)
- Till Camilo Torres och revolutionen i Latinamerika – Röster i mänskligt landskap (1971)
- Ägget är löst! (1975)
- Interlude/Wings for chorus and jazz-ensemble/Cradle Song (1987)
- Construction and Hymn + Canon for Chamber Orchestra and Magnetic Tape Theme * Prelude * Nocturne (1988)
- Janson: Miscellaneous Works (1988) with the Royal Philharmonic Orchestra
- Orchestral Adventures (1995), with Bjørn Kruse, Jon Øivind Ness & Kjell Flem
- Borealis (1992)
- 20th Century Norwegian String Quartets (2000), with Fartein Valen, Klaus Egge & Johan Kvandal
- Selvportrett (2002)
- Nasjonalsang (2007)
- En bibelhistorie (2009), with Teodor Janson, Christian Eggen, Oslo Sinfonietta
- Janson: Nocturne (2014), with Per Nørgård

Awards
Preceded by Terje Isungset	Recipient of the «Open class» Edvardprisen; 2009	Succeeded by Nils Petter Molvær
Preceded by Malika Makouf Rasmussen	Recipient of the Open class Gammleng-prisen; 2010	Succeeded by Sissel Kyrkjebø
