= Malika Makouf Rasmussen =

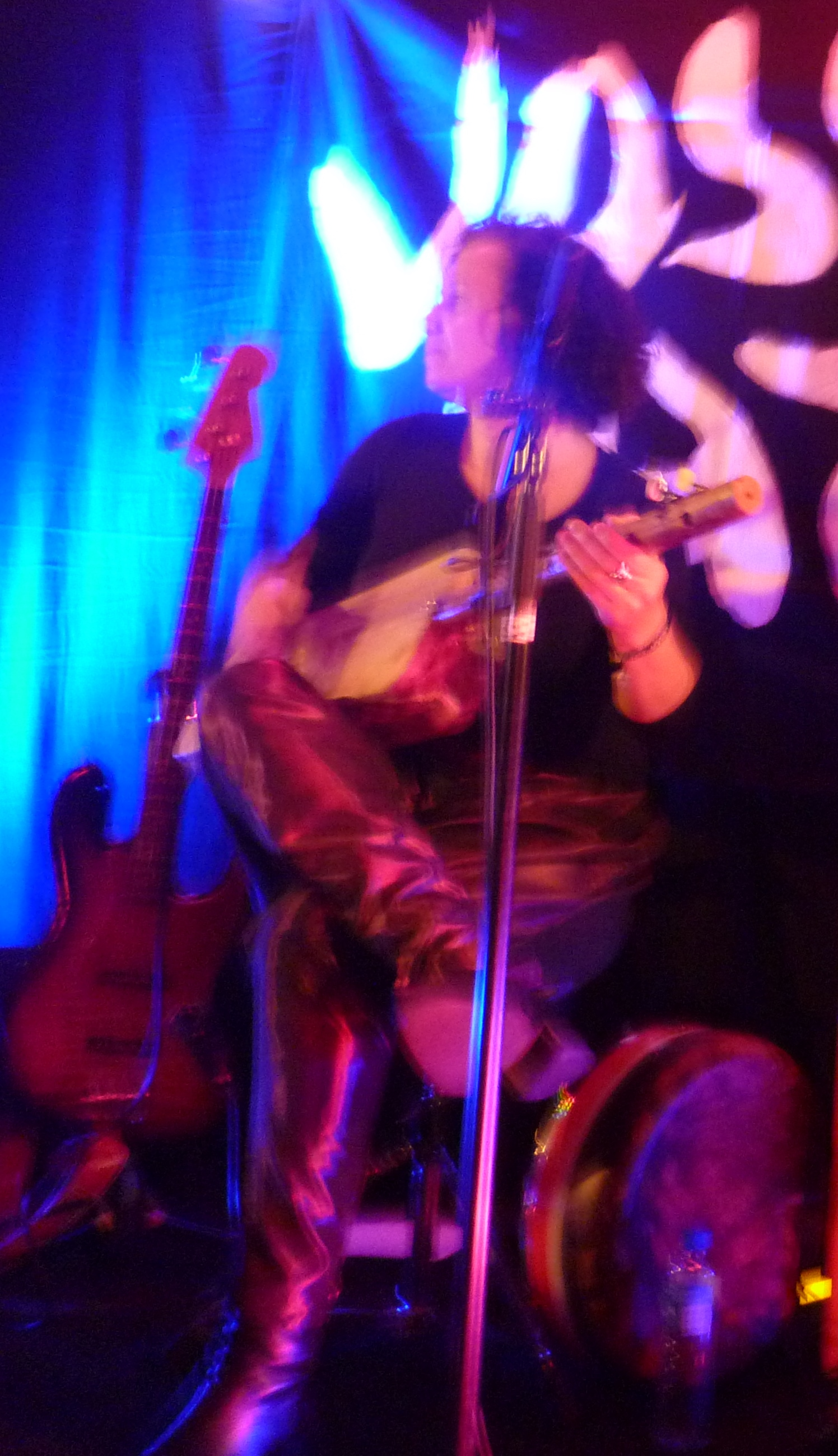
- Makouf Rasmussen at the 2017 Vossajazz.

Background information
- Born: 27 February 1965 (age 61); Algiers, Algeria
- Origin: Algeria, Norway, France
- Genres: Contemporary, world
- Occupations: Composer, musician, music producer, curator, philosopher, writer
- Instruments: Percussion, guitar, bass guitar, vocals
- Label: New Music
- Website: www.malikamakoufrasmussen.com

Malika Makouf Rasmussen (born 27 February 1965 in Algiers, Algeria) is a Norwegian/Algerian/French composer, musician, music producer, curator and philosopher.

== Early life ==
Rasmussen was born 1965 in Algiers, Algeria, to Algerian-French-Norwegian parents. Her family left Algeria and stayed in Budapest, Hungary, for a year before in 1970 they ended in Norway. Rasmussen started to play classical guitar at the age nine and later picked up the electric bass. When fifteen she went to stay in Paris for a year with her father. She resided in Fredrikstad after returning to Norway, and was involved in different bands during the following year. She studied music at Sønstevold Institute of Music and at nineteen she graduated from Greåker Music College.

== Career ==
Rasmussen started her professional career in Paris, France (1985). During this period she was inspired by the creative friction emerging when people of different backgrounds are put together, and she found the way back to what she has described as her roots and began to develop a musical expression within the then new genre termed crossover and world music. When she went to Oslo in the 1990s, she worked as a session musician and initiated several of her own band projects beside studying musical and cultural studies at Telemark University College and the Norwegian Academy of Music, and later pursued a master's degree in philosophy at the University of Oslo.

She has toured widely in Europe and Africa, and has performed at a number of festivals and concert halls around the world, like the Harare International Music and Film Festival, Olympia Paris, Tune In (Stockholm), Great Bear (New York), Klaverfabriken (Hillerød) and Vanløse Kulturhus (Copenhagen).

Rasmussen has collaborated on numerous recordings and has released four solo albums, Exit Cairo (2006) with guest appearance by Bugge Wesseltoft and Mari Boine, On Club (2008), Urbanized (2010) and So Easy So High (2012).

== Honors ==
- 2009: Gammleng-prisen in the Open category
- 2010: Oslo Screen Festival: Honourable Mention for music to the video "The Red City", 2010
- 2011: Kardemommestipendiet NOPA

== Discography ==
=== Solo albums ===
- 2006: Exit Cairo (New Music)
- 2008: On Club (New Music)
- 2010: Urbanized (New Music)
- 2012: So Easy So High (New Music)

=== Collaborations ===
Selected

With Tabanka Dance Ensemble

- 2017: "Limbo" (composer. musician, music producer)

With Mechamnix Films

- 2017: "The Other Jerusalem" (composer. musician, music producer)

With Kristin Asbjørnsen, Oddrun Lilja Jonsdottir, Luis Landa-Schreitt, Wei Ting Tzeng, Dahir Doni

2017: "Club Montmartre" (composer. musician, band leader)

With Mari Boine

- 2006: Idjagieðas (In The Hand of the Night) (Composer)

With Queendom

- 2002: Queendom (composer. musician, music producer)

With Team Maroon

- 2003: The R.I.S.E. (music producer)

With Modern Rhythmic Team

- 2003: Desert Dance 2001 Dualisme (composer. musician, music producer)

With Women's Voice

- 2004: Women's Voice (music producer)

With Miriam Aziz

- 2007: We're Inside Out (Rock Pixie Records) (music producer)
- 2009: Transito (Rock Pixie Records/New Music) (music producer)

With Line Peters

- 2008: Tell Me How the Story Goes (New Music) (music producer)

With Women's Voice International Music Network

- 2009: Dodoma (composer. musician, music producer, band leader)
- 2005: "Trafficking" (composer. musician, music producer, band leader)
- 2004: "Women's Voice" (composer. musician, music producer, band leader)

With Cuantum Force

- 2011: Soul Particles (Charles Mena) (music producer)

Awards
Preceded by Anneli Drecker	Recipient of the Open class Gammleng-prisen; 2009	Succeeded by Alfred Janson
