= Reidar Hirsti =

Norwegian newspaper editor and politician

Reidar Andreas Hirsti (14 March 1925 – 12 April 2001) was a Norwegian newspaper editor and politician for the Labour Party.

He was born in Tana, and his first language was Sami. During his childhood he experienced Norwegianization as well as the brutal scorched earth retreat by Nazi German occupants in 1944. He finished his secondary education as late as in 1947. He enrolled in studies, but did not complete them. Instead he was the chairman of Workers' Youth League, the youth wing of the Labour Party, from 1955 to 1958.

Hirsti then became known as editor-in-chief of Arbeiderbladet. He was appointed at the Labour Party national convention in 1963, and the editor position also secured him a seat in the Labour Party central committee. From 1970 to 1974 he chaired the Association of Norwegian Editors. He was removed by people in the party in 1974. From 1974 to 1975, during the second cabinet Bratteli, he served as State Secretary in the Ministry of Industry. He then spent his career in the Norwegian Broadcasting Corporation. Most notably he was the programme editor from 1980 to 1987. From 1976 to 1980 he was a board member of the Arts Council Norway. He retired in 1995.

Hirsti authored many books, many about historical or Sami topics. He biographed Johan Nygaardsvold, Gro Harlem Brundtland and Yngve Hågensen. His 1991 book Partipisken describes the inner discipline of the Labour Party and its newspaper. In 2000 he received the Fritt Ord Honorary Award.

His wife since 1954 died in October 1989. Hirsti died in April 2001 in Oslo.

Party political offices
Preceded by Ivar Mathiesen	Chairman of the Workers' Youth League; 1955–1958	Succeeded by Bjartmar Gjerde
Media offices
Preceded by Olav Larssen	Chief editor of Arbeiderbladet; 1963–1974	Succeeded by Einar Olsen
