= Mette Janson =

Norwegian journalist

- Born: 1 May 1934; Bergen, Norway
- Died: 24 November 2004 (aged 70)
- Occupation: Journalist
- Spouse: Magne Bleness (m. 1961)
- Father: Gunnar Janson
- Relatives: Alfred Janson (brother); Henry Gleditsch (uncle)

Mette Janson (1 May 1934 – 24 November 2004) was a Norwegian journalist. She was born in Bergen, the daughter of the sculptor Gunnar Janson and the sister of the composer Alfred Janson, niece of Henry Gleditsch. She married the theatre director Magne Bleness. She was the first female news presenter of Dagsrevyen, and worked for the Norwegian Broadcasting Corporation for more than forty years.
