= Nybrott (Larvik newspaper) =

Norwegian newspaper published in Larvik in Vestfold county, Norway

Nybrott (lit. "New Clearing") was a Norwegian newspaper published in Larvik in Vestfold county, Norway.

== History and profile ==
Nybrot was started on 9 September 1911 as a Labour Party newspaper. It was first weekly, was then published twice a week, then daily from 1915. On 10 January 1921 it was merged with Bratsberg-Demokraten to form Folkets Dagblad, a regional newspaper for both Telemark and Vestfold, but the merger was reversed after 19 May 1922. Nybrot modernized its name to Nybrott in 1926.

During the occupation of Norway by Nazi Germany, Nybrott was again merged, this time with Østlands-Posten by decree of the Nazi authorities. The new newspaper was called Larvik Dagblad and lasted from 1 July 1943 to 31 May 1945, three weeks after the end of war and occupation.

From 1970 Arne Tumyr was the editor. From 1971 it was a morning newspaper, and Tumyr also "tabloidized" the journalism of newspaper, although the tabloid format was not adopted until 1983. From the same year it rid itself of the Labour Party connection. It had struggled financially despite help from the labour movement, but did not fare better on its own and went defunct after the last issue on 18 August 1984.
