= Olav Brunvand =

Norwegian newspaper editor and politician

Olav Arnold Brunvand (7 January 1912 – 15 February 1988) was a Norwegian newspaper editor and politician for the Labour Party.

He was born in Kristiansand as the son of tailor Olav Brunvand, Sr. (1878–1944) and Anna Olsen (1878–1952). In 1936 he married Åsta Bergliot Strømme (1915–1988). His father was a Social Democratic ballot candidate in the Market towns of Vest-Agder and Rogaland counties for the 1921 general election but was not elected.

He worked as a journalist in Sørlandet from 1934, and in Bergens Arbeiderblad from 1939. These newspapers belonged to the Labour Party, and were thus subject to repression during the occupation of Norway by Nazi Germany from 1940 to 1945; Brunvand was imprisoned by the Germans from 1941 to 1945. He was arrested in October 1941, spent time in Ulven concentration camp in November before being sent via Bergen to Hamburg-Fuhlsbüttel in December. In August 1943 he was transferred to Rendsburg, later to Dreibergen. During his stay in German prisons he made notes which were later published in newspaper articles, and issued in 1968 as the book Smil og tårer i tukthus. The manuscript was written on toilet paper and smuggled out by Hiltgunt Zassenhaus, who buried it and sent it to Brunvand after he had returned to Bergen in 1945.

In 1945 he was promoted to subeditor in Bergens Arbeiderblad. He was then the editor and manager of the news agency Arbeidernes Pressekontor from 1949 to 1952 and 1954 to 1978. From 1952 to 1954 he served as State Secretary in the Ministry of Defence as a part of the Labour cabinet Torp.

He was the father of Per Brunvand.
