= Sørlandet (newspaper) =

Norwegian newspaper

Sørlandet (lit. "Southern Norway") was a Norwegian newspaper, published in Kristiansand in Vest-Agder county.

Sørlandets Social-Democrat was started on 5 January 1907, after a trisal issue on 21 December 1906, as a Labour Party newspaper. It was weekly from the start, but daily from 1909. The name was changed to Sørlandet from 30 April 1923. The change followed a letter in 1922 from the Comintern Executive which stated that no newspaper should have "Social Democrat" or "Democrat" in its title. The breakthrough came in 1927, when, after years of turbulence in the labour movement, the Labour Party absorbed the Social Democratic Labour Party. Four years later a former Communist became the newspaper's editor. Notable editors were Ole Øisang (1920–1925), Olav Scheflo (1931–1939) and Odd Lien (1956-1977). Jakob Friis also contributed. Olav Brunvand (not to be confused with the newspaper's first editor) was a journalist from 1934 to 1939.

During the occupation of Norway by Nazi Germany, Sørlandet was stopped between 28 January 1941 and 8 May 1945. It was then revived, and retained its Labour connection until 1986. It then struggled financially, with a circulation of 5,721 compared to 8,129 in 1965. The last editor under Labour flag was Arne Tumyr from 1984 to 1986. Trygve Hegnar owned the newspaper for two years until 1988 without managing to breathe life into it. It went defunct after its last issue on 7 February 1990.
