= Arne Tumyr =

Norwegian politician (1933–2023)

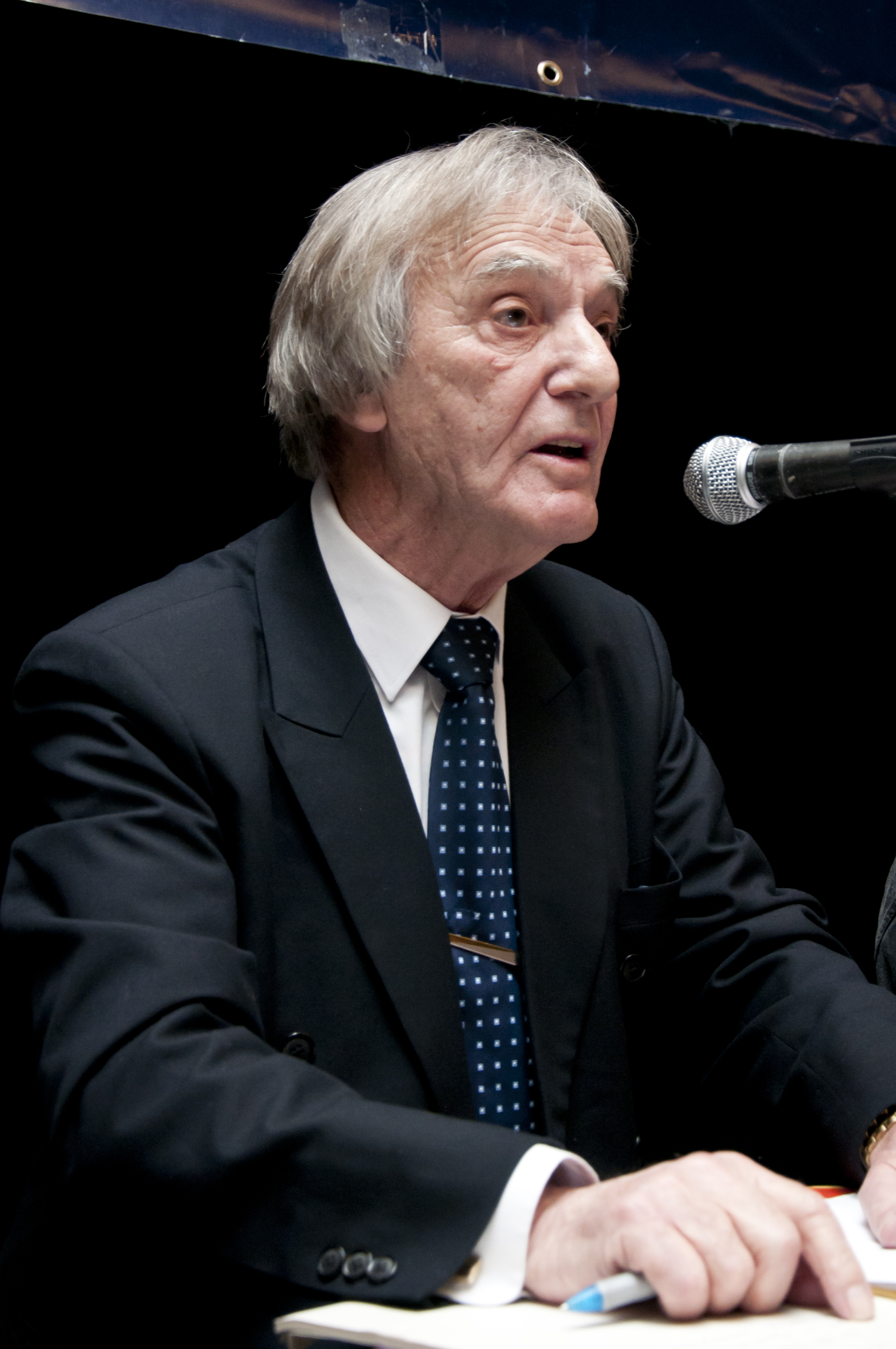
Tumyr in 2012

Arne Tumyr (6 March 1933 – 17 February 2023) was a Norwegian journalist, newspaper editor, politician and leader of Stop Islamisation of Norway.

== Career and activism ==
Tumyr grew up in Ask in Askøy Municipality, from where he moved in 1950. He was educated as a baker in 1952, and he started working as a journalist apprentice for the newspaper Nordlands Framtid in Bodø in 1956. In 1960 he was hired as subeditor in Sunnmøre Arbeideravis, and from 1961 to 1970 he was a journalist in Bergens Arbeiderblad. In 1970 he was hired as editor-in-chief of the Larvik-based newspaper Nybrott. From 1984 to 1986 he edited the newspaper Sørlandet. He published a newspaper called Ukeavisen Aktuelt from 1986 to 1988, a weekly and free newspaper, unusual in Norway at the time.

Tumyr founded the Bergen chapter of the Norwegian Humanist Association in 1967, and was a self-declared Atheist. He later became leader of the Vest-Agder chapter of the same organisation. He was in 1999, however, forced to withdraw from his position after his immigration-critical comment, titled "Stopp islamiseringen av Norge" ("Stop the Islamisation of Norway"), in the newspaper Fædrelandsvennen. The Norwegian Humanist Association was in 2005 convicted by Oslo District Court of defamatory comments against Tumyr, written in a letter to the editor of Fædrelandsvennen by a board member of the Vest-Agder chapter. Tumyr was for a long time a member of the Norwegian Labour Party, but later changed to the Progress Party, of which he for a period was leader of the party's local Kristiansand group. Later in life he was no longer a member of any political party.

From 2007 until 2014, Tumyr was the leader of the organisation Stop Islamisation of Norway (originally Forum Against Islamisation). He described "Islamic ideology" as "diabolical". In 2012 he held a speech at the counter-jihad meeting in Aarhus, Denmark. Among others, Stop the Islamisation of Norway and Tumyr were involved in demonstrations that needed police protection as they were attacked by counter-protestors.

== Books and personal life ==
Tumyr was the author of the books Knut Hamsun og hans kors (1996, Norgesforlaget) and Vardene brenner! (2008, Kolofon forlag).

His son Erik Tumyr was an award-winning journalist, who started his career in Nybrott in 1983.

Tumyr died on 17 February 2023, at the age of 89.
