= Royal Norwegian Naval Academy =

Military academy in Bergen, Norway

Coordinates: 60°23′39.04″N 5°15′57.92″E

- Sjøkrigsskolen (Norwegian)
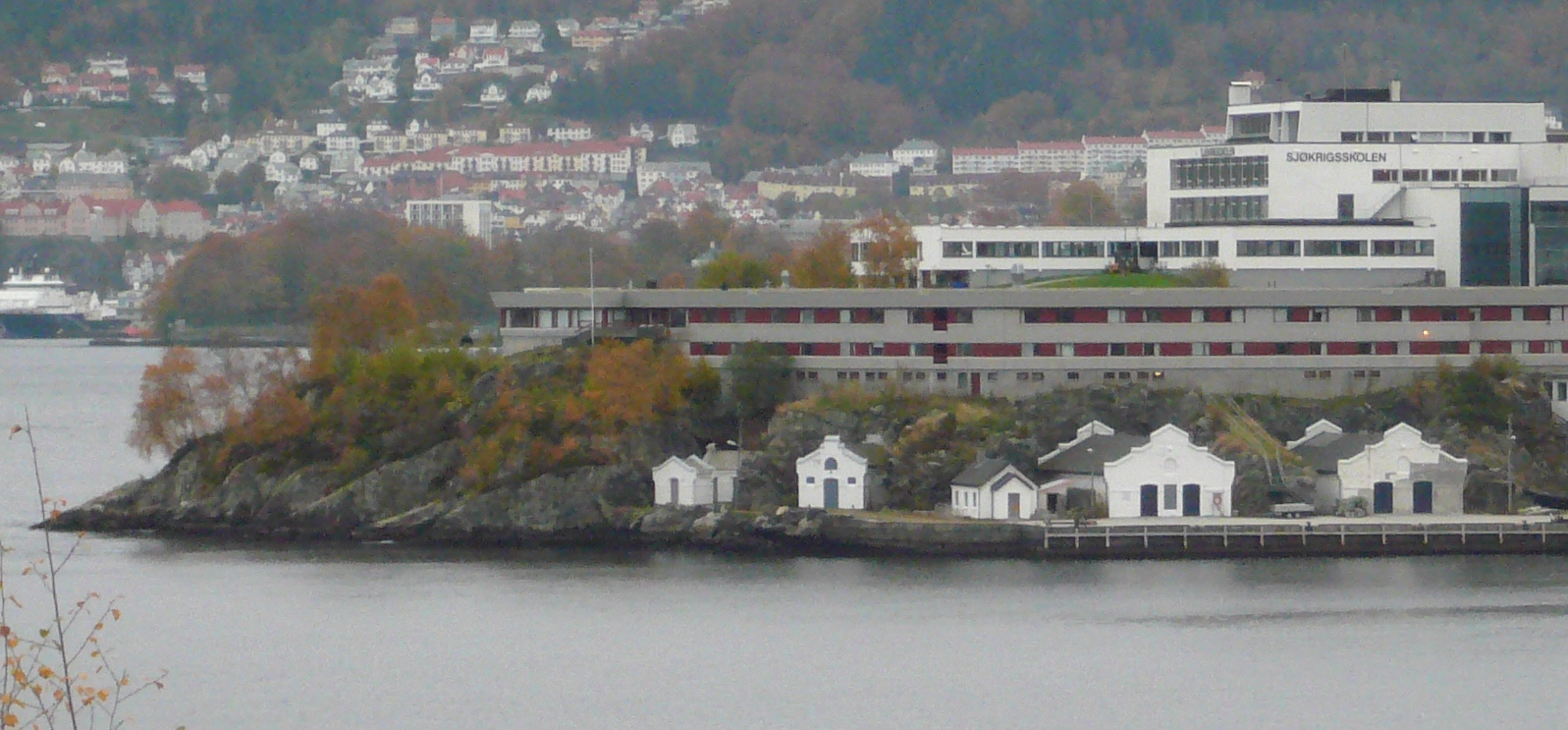
- Royal Norwegian Naval Academy buildings in Bergen
- Former names: Søcadet-Akademiet (1701-1814) Royal Norwegian Sea Cadet Institute (1817-1940)
- Type: Service Academy
- Established: October 27, 1817; 208 years ago
- Affiliations: Royal Norwegian Navy
- Location: Laksevåg in Bergen, Norway
- Website: Norwegian Naval Academy homepage (in Norwegian)

The Royal Norwegian Naval Academy (RNoNA, Sjøkrigsskolen in Norwegian) is located at Laksevåg in Bergen. It was formally established 27 October 1817 in Frederiksvern. The institution educates officers for the Royal Norwegian Navy.

== History ==
The predecessor of the Norwegian Naval Academy was the Søcadet-Akademiet, which was established in 1701 in Copenhagen for the education of naval officers for the Danish-Norwegian naval forces. After the union between Denmark and Norway dissolved in 1814, the Kongelige Norske Søcadet-Institut (Royal Norwegian Sea Cadet Institute) was opened in 1817 at the main naval base at Fredriksvern. In 1864 both the main base and the Sea Cadet Institute were moved to Horten, where the operations continued until 1940. During the subsequent German occupation of Norway, a temporary Naval Academy was established in London in 1941. After the war the academy was first located in Oslo, but in 1960 it was relocated to the present site in Laksevåg, Bergen.

== Study programmes ==
The RNoNA has a status of an independent institution under the Norwegian Act on Universities and University Colleges. It has been accredited to develop study programmes at the undergraduate level, to award bachelor's degrees, and to evaluate degrees from other institutions.

Master's degrees are awarded at the Norwegian Defence University College in Oslo, but officers may continue with graduate studies also at civilian universities.

In 2013, the academy offered six programmes leading to the Bachelor of Military Studies degree, where of three programmes leads to a bachelor's degree in engineering.

Current and former coat of arms of the Royal Norwegian Naval Academy.
