= Magne Bleness =

Norwegian actor and theatre director

- Born: 30 April 1933; Fana, Norway
- Died: 1 December 1992 (aged 59)
- Occupations: Actor and theatre director
- Spouses: Berit Gøril Havrevold (m. 1957) Mette Janson (m. 1961)
- Children: Carsten Bleness (b. 1958)

Magne Bleness (30 April 1933 – 1 December 1992) was a Norwegian actor and theatre director.

He was born in Fana, and was married twice, first to Berit Gøril Havrevold in 1957, second to Mette Janson in 1961. He had the son Carsten Bleness (b. 1958).

He made his stage debut in 1953 in Oslo, at Sommerteatret, and later worked at Nationaltheatret and Fjernsynsteatret. His first stage production was the play Semmelweiss by Jens Bjørneboe, at Nationaltheatret in 1969. He was theatre director of Fjernsynsteatret from 1980 to 1990.
