= Arne Strand =

Norwegian journalist and politician

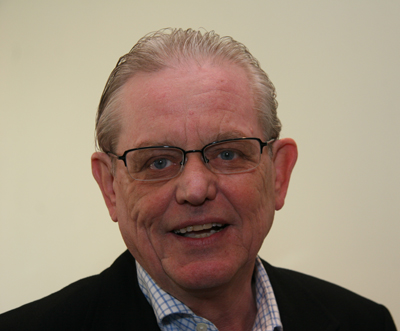
- Strand in 2007
- Born: 17 March 1944; Oslo, German-occupied Norway
- Died: 10 May 2023 (aged 79)
- Education: University of Oslo
- Occupations: Journalist and editor, Dagsavisen
- Political party: Norwegian Labour Party

Arne Strand (17 March 1944 – 10 May 2023) was a Norwegian journalist and politician for the Labour Party. He was the political editor in the newspaper Dagsavisen until his death.

Strand graduated from the University of Oslo with the cand.mag. degree in 1968. He worked as a journalist in Vårt Land from 1964 to 1966, in Arbeiderbladet from 1966 to 1976, and in the Norwegian Broadcasting Corporation from 1976 to 1987. Between 1987 and 1989 he was a State Secretary in the Office of the Prime Minister, as a part of Gro Harlem Brundtland's second cabinet.

Having been political editor and news editor in his later years with the Norwegian Broadcasting Corporation, in 1990 he was hired as political editor in Arbeiderbladet, which in 1997 changed its name to Dagsavisen. He was acting editor-in-chief from 2004 to 2005 and from 2009. From 1999 to 2006 he chaired the Norwegian branch of the International Press Institute.

Strand was the adoptive father of the television host Christian Strand.

Strand died on 10 May 2023, at the age of 79. He had been ill with cancer for 17 years prior to his death.

Media offices
Preceded by Hilde Haugsgjerd	Chief editor of Dagsavisen; 2004–2005 (acting)	Succeeded by Carsten Bleness
Preceded by Carsten Bleness	Chief editor of Dagsavisen; 2009 (acting)	Incumbent
