= Jøtul =

Norwegian manufacturer of wood heating appliances

Jøtul AS
- Company type: Aksjeselskap
- Industry: Heating appliances
- Founded: 1853
- Founder: Oluf Onsum
- Headquarters: Fredrikstad (Østfold), Norway
- Area served: Worldwide
- Key people: Eskil Zapffe (CEO)
- Products: Jøtul, Scan, Atra, Ild, Warm, Jøtul Group Accessories, Jotul Group Chimney System
- Revenue: NOK 850 million (US$103.5 million) (2015)
- Number of employees: 618 (2015)
- Subsidiaries: Jøtul North America Inc. Jøtul France SAS; Jøtul UK Ltd; Jøtul Hispania S.L. Jotul Polska Sp. z.o.o. Scan A/S; Jøtul Italia Srl
- Website: www.jotul.com

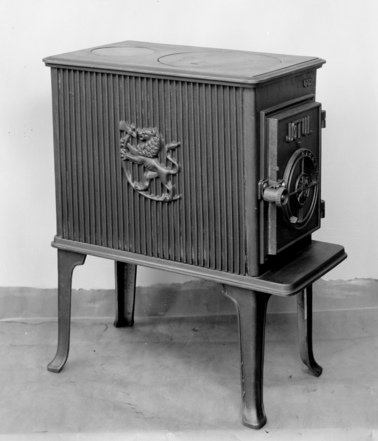
Jøtul F 602 woodstove, designed in the late 1930s by the architects Blakstad and Munthe-Kaas and decorated by sculptor Ørnulf Bast

Jøtul AS (Norwegian pronunciation: [ˈjø̂ːtʉl]) is a Norwegian limited company that manufactures cast iron stoves and fireplaces. The head office is situated in Fredrikstad. Jøtul AS is also the parent company in the Jøtul Group, with subsidiaries in the United States, United Kingdom, Denmark, France, Italy, Spain and Poland.

== History ==
Jøtul was founded by Oluf Onsum as Kværner Jernstøberi (Kværner Foundry) in the outskirts of Christiania (now Oslo) in 1853. While stoves initially were the main products, the company had diversified by the beginning of the 20th century, when it produced turbines and lumber equipment. As the heating appliance manufacture decreased in importance, the production was spun off in 1916 and sold to Herman Anker, one of Kværner's managers. He founded Jøtul AS in 1920 as a sales organization for its products. The sales stagnated during the depression in the 1920s, and 36-year-old Herman Anker died in 1927, leaving it to his successor, 34-year-old Johannes Gahr to modernize and eventually salvage the company. By 1935, the turnaround had succeeded, and the firm acquired its modern name.

By the 1960s, stoves using liquid fuels, especially kerosene had supplanted wood-burning appliances, a trend that was only reversed in the 1970s, partly due to the 1973 oil crisis. Jøtul used this opportunity to gain a strong international foothold and drastically increased its exports to continental Europe and North America.

The Gahr family sold the business to Norcem in 1977, and a period of international expansion began, as Jøtul acquired a number of foundries and importers abroad. This period lasted for approximately ten years, but came to an end during the recession in the late 1980s, when Jøtul once again focussed on the domestic market. However, it has resumed its international diversification in the 21st century, and today its products are sold worldwide.

In March 2018, Jøtul was acquired by the global private equity firm OpenGate Capital. Along with management, OpenGate has crafted a plan to boost performance and eliminate inefficiencies in Jøtul's operations. In addition, OpenGate Capital is actively searching for add-on targets to further drive Jøtul's growth. In November 2018, OpenGate and Jøtul completed the add-on acquisition of AICO, an Italian and French based pellet-burning stove leader.

== Products and markets ==
The Jøtul Group sells and markets its products under the brands Jøtul, Scan, Atra, Ild, Warm, Jøtul Group Accessories and Jøtul Group Chimney System throughout North and South America, Europe, South Africa, Asia and Oceania.

Jøtul products have received several design awards from both the Norwegian Design Council and Red dot design awards.
