= Eirik Hoff Lysholm =

Norwegian newspaper editor

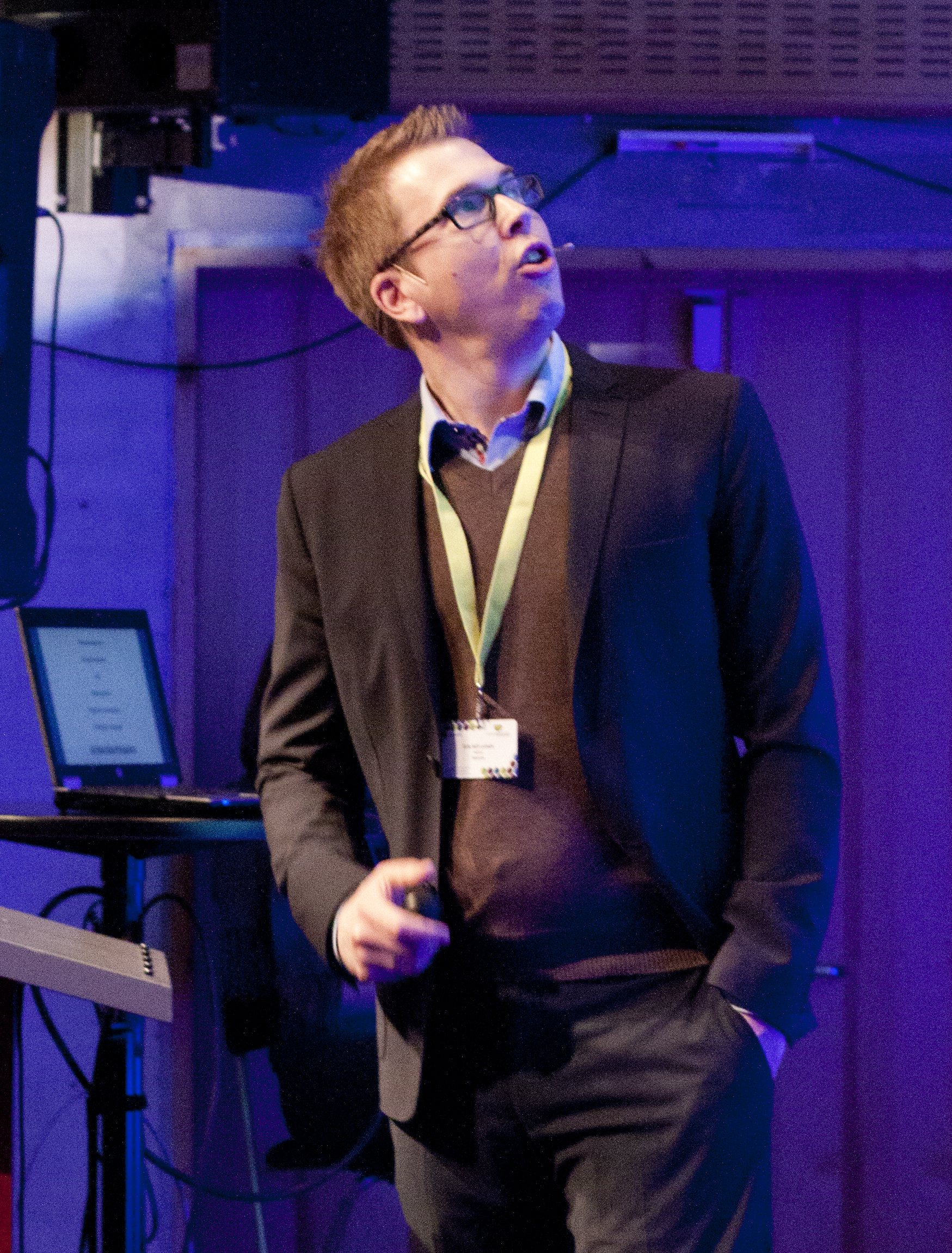
- Born: 4 February 1975 (age 50); Bodø, Norway
- Occupation: Newspaper editor
- Employer(s): Mentor Medier; Dagsavisen

Eirik Hoff Lysholm (born 4 February 1975) is a Norwegian journalist and newspaper editor. He was chief editor of Dagsavisen from 2014 to 2023. Since 2023 he has been chief editor of the newspaper Avisa Oslo.

== Life and career ==
Born in Bodø on 4 February 1975, Lysholm started his career as sports journalist for Nordlandsposten from 1994 to 1995, and for Bergensavisen from 1995 to 1999. He was reporter for Verdens Gang from 1999 to 2001. After a second period in Bergensavisen (2001–2003) he returned to Verdens Gang (2003–2005).

From 2006 to 2010 he was assigned with the weekly magazine Her og Nå. From 2010 he was appointed executive officer for the media company Mentor Medier. From 2011 he was managing director of the newspaper Dagsavisen. From 2013 he was appointed acting chief editor of the newspaper. From 2014 to 2023 he was both chief editor and managing director for Dagsavisen. In October 2023 he became chief editor of the local newspaper Avisa Oslo.

Lysholm chaired the board of the Norwegian Press Association from 2019 to 2021, and of the Association of Norwegian Editors from 2021 to 2023.
