= Avisenes Nyhetsbyrå =

Norwegian News Agency that is established in 1912

Avisenes Nyhetsbyrå (ANB) (English: "Newspapers' News Agency") is a Norwegian news agency that was established in 1912 as Socialdemokratisk Pressekontor. In 1919 this was changed to Arbeidernes Pressekontor ("The Workers' Press Office") and in 1984 it was changed again to A-pressens Oslo-redaksjon (APOR). In 1990 the agency was reorganized as a joint stock company, and on 1 September 2001 it got its current name.

The agency is owned by 31 Norwegian newspapers and in addition A-pressen. ANB's main task is to deliver current news to Norwegian media, primarily local and regional newspapers. In addition ANB delivers radio and television pages, football and harness racing tips, consumer news and news magazines.

On 1 January 2007 ANB went into partnership with Norsk Telegrambyrå (NTB). NTB took over the daily wire service which AND had delivered, whereas ANB concentrated on delivery and re-distribution of exclusive stories and services to the subscribers.
