= Christian Holtermann Knudsen =

Norwegian politician (1845–1929)

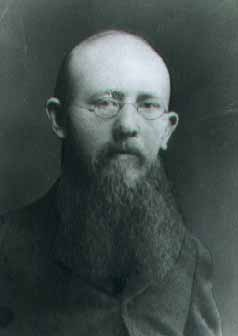

Member of Parliament
- In office 1906–1915

Personal details
- Born: 15 July 1845 Bergen
- Died: 21 April 1929 (aged 83)
- Party: Labour
- Occupation: Newspaper editor Printer; Publisher
- Profession: Typographer

Christian Holtermann Knudsen (15 July 1845 – 21 April 1929) was a Norwegian typographer, newspaper editor, publisher, trade unionist and politician for the Norwegian Labour Party. He is known as chairman of his party in three non-consecutive periods, and also founded what would become the main party newspaper. He served three terms in the Norwegian Parliament.

== Career ==
=== Media and trade unions ===
He was born in Bergen as the son of a cooper. He finished a typographer's education in 1865, and worked for several printing presses in Kristiania. Most notably he worked for the weekly newspaper Almuevennen, as typographer for six years and manager for eight years. In 1872 he was among the co-founders of the trade union Oslo Typografiske Forening. He chaired this organization from 1876 to 1878, 1879 to 1882 and 1883 to 1885, and in 1883 he co-founded the first trade union center in Norway, Fagforeningernes Centralkomité.

In 1884 Knudsen established the newspaper Vort Arbeide ('Our Work'), on behalf of the central committee. The first issue was released on 10 May 1884, and led to Knudsen being fired from Almuevennen. He also had to establish his own printing press since none of the existing printing presses wanted to be affiliated with a labourer's newspaper. The fledgling project was marred by economic problems, and the burden of both writing, editing and printing lay chiefly on Knudsen. In 1885 he founded the association Socialdemokratisk Forening, which formally took over the newspaper. The name was changed from Vort Arbeide to Social-Demokraten ('The Social Democrat') in 1886. At the same time, Carl Jeppesen took over as editor-in-chief, although Knudsen would return as editor from 1892 to 1893.

Knudsen expanded the printing press, and published several books, many of which were frowned upon by the establishment. Kristian Stenrud's books were controversial, and Hans Jæger's book Fra Kristiania-Bohemen, published in 1885, was instantly banned upon publication. Jæger was sentenced to eighty days in jail, appealed to the Supreme Court and had it reduced to sixty days. Jæger's defender, Ludvig Meyer, later became both editor-in-chief of Social-Demokraten and leader of the Labour Party. Jæger and Knudsen later tried to circumvent the law and sell the banned book in Sweden, brandishing a fake name Julefortællinger af H.J. ('Christmas Carols by H.J.') on the cover, but this was discovered and the book banned in Sweden as well. Knudsen also received a jail sentence, of eleven days, for publishing a piece about contraception in Social-Demokraten in 1887. Nonetheless, Knudsen became the official stamp printer in 1895.

=== Political party ===
Knudsen, inspired by German theories, argued that "socialism [is] the only means" to "help the working estate". He became a co-founder of the Norwegian Labour Party in August 1887 in Arendal. Like the trade unions, the early Labour Party contained both socialist and non-socialist elements. The most important political demand was universal suffrage. Knudsen was a member of the central committee from the beginning, and then became party leader from 1889 to 1890 and 1900 to 1903. From 1899 to 1926 he was a member of Kristiania city council. He was elected to the Norwegian Parliament in 1906, representing the constituency of Grünerløkken, and was re-elected in 1909 and 1912. For the first two terms he was the leader of the parliamentary party group.

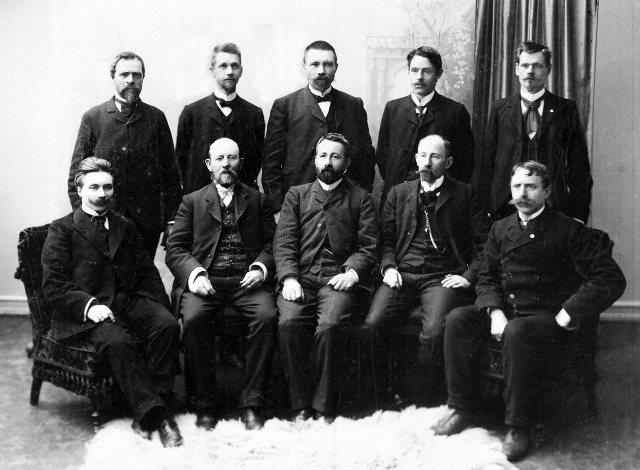
Labour parliamentary group 1906; Knudsen second from the left in the lower row.

Knudsen was a deputy member of the Norwegian Nobel Committee from 1913, and served his third term as party leader from 1911 to 1918. His leadership came to an end when the radical wing, spearheaded by Kyrre Grepp and Martin Tranmæl, took over at the 1918 national party convention. He left the central committee, but returned in 1920. When the less radical wing broke out to form the Social Democratic Labour Party in 1921, Knudsen did not follow; he continued in the central committee until 1924. In 1923 the name of the newspaper Social-Demokraten had been changed again, to Arbeiderbladet ('The Labour Paper'). It became the main organ of the Labour Party, undergoing direct control; the editor-in-chief was also represented in the national party board. As the newspapers became independent in the latter quarter of the twentieth century, the newspaper changed its name again, to the current Dagsavisen.

=== Postage Stamp Production ===
On 15 May 1895, typographer Knudsen was awarded the printing contract for producing Norway's postage stamps, postage due stamps, and postal stationery for the period 1895-1900. This contract was renewed several times and was maintained by his Trustee, Gunnar Meyer, from 1929 until 1937. Notable issues (by letterpress) include the 1895-1910 Posthorn, the 1909-1937 "redrawn" Posthorn, the King Haakon VII kroner values, 1907-1936, and the Rampant Lion series I and II, 1922-1937.

Knudsen died in 1929.

Media offices
Preceded by position created	Chief editor of Vort Arbeide; 1884–1886	Succeeded by Carl Jeppesen
Preceded by Carl Jeppesen	Chief editor of Social-Demokraten; 1892–1893	Succeeded by Oscar Nissen
Party political offices
Preceded by Hans G. Jensen	Leader of the Norwegian Labour Party; 1889–1890	Succeeded by Carl Jeppesen
Preceded by Ludvig Meyer	Leader of the Norwegian Labour Party; 1900–1903	Succeeded by Christopher Hornsrud
Preceded by Oscar Nissen	Leader of the Norwegian Labour Party; 1911–1918	Succeeded by Kyrre Grepp
