= Grepp =

Grepp is a surname. Notable people with the surname include:

- Gerda Grepp (1907–1940), Norwegian translator, journalist, and socialist
- Kyrre Grepp (1879–1922), Norwegian politician
- Lotte Grepp Knutsen (born 1973), Norwegian politician
- Michael Grepp (born 1985), American actor and musician
- Rachel Grepp (1879–1961), Norwegian journalist and politician
