= Kristiania match workers' strike of 1889 =

1889 industrial dispute in Norway

The striking workers. Organizer Carl Jeppesen is wearing a top hat to the left of the crowd.

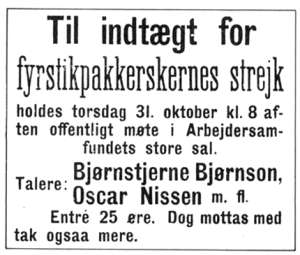
Announcement regarding the Match Workers' Strike in Kristiania in 1889

The Kristiania match workers strike was a Norwegian industrial dispute involving female match workers at factories Bryn and Grønvold in the city of Kristiania (now Oslo) in 1889. The strike started when the wages were suddenly reduced by 20% in October 1889, and involved 372 of the female workers. It ended 13 December the same year. The strike attracted considerable public sympathy, including from Bjørnstjerne Bjørnson and Oscar Nissen.

Before the strike, none of the workers at the factories were unionized. They had already gone on strike twice before, in 1886 and 1888, but without results. They were not paid an hourly wage, but rather based on how many matches they could package during the working day, which started at 6:00 and could last from 12 to 13 and a half hours. On average, the workers earned between 5.00 kr and 6.50 kr a week, less than half the average wage of male workers. At Grønvold, there was a system of fines as a result of which arriving late by a few minutes could lead to a worker losing the entire week's wages. The matches were made with white phosphorus and the factories were badly ventilated, such that the packagers had to work surrounded by phosphorus fumes, leading to severe injuries.

In October 1889, it was announced that wages for the women packaging workers would be cut from 7 to 5.5 øre per gross, that is 144 matches. In response to this, a strike started spontaneously on 23 October, without any formal demands. Carl Jeppesen, editor of the Labour Party newspaper Social-Demokraten, publicized the strike in the newspaper and helped organize a meeting among the workers. At this meeting, which took place on 26 October, the workers elected a strike committee of six, which then formulated their demands. The workers demanded 12 hours work-days, a payment of 0.07 kr per gross matches, and the abolition of the fine system. The number of strikers were 266 packers from Grønvolds fyrstikkfabrikk and 102 from Bryn.

The conflict received country-wide publicity. Among the outside supporters were the feminist pioneers Fernanda Nissen and Ragna Nielsen. Bjørnstjerne Bjørnson appeared as speaker at public mass meetings, along with Jeppesen and Oscar Nissen. The strike went on for weeks, while the workers received financial support from fund-raising campaigns. There was, however, little movement in the negotiations between the workers and the factory owners, and the strike was declared terminated 12 December 1889.

The strike's only achievement was a somewhat lighter fine system, but the conflict eventually had implications for the emerging labour movement. It was later treated in Olav Dalgard's film Gryr i Norden from 1939.
