= Nils Johan Schjander (1931–2009) =

Nils Johan Schjander (April 9, 1931 – February 9, 2009) was a Norwegian author, manager, and editor.

Schjander was born in Oslo. He wrote several books about administration and leadership, and he made his debut in fiction in 1984 with the novel Menn gråter ikke (Men Do Not Cry). He was the son of Fredrik Severin Schjander and Nora Marta Schjander (née Kristensen), and the grandson of the engineer Nils Johan Schjander, a member of the Kristiania Bohemians. Schjander is buried in the cemetery at Ullern Church.

== Works ==
- Tett på 60 norske toppledere, 1998, Pantagruel forlag
- Mannsekspressen, novel, 1998, Pantagruel forlag
- Hvis jeg bare hadde en bedre sjef, 1995, Hjemmets bokforlag
- Tårer for en sønn, 1994, Aschehoug
- Når katastrofen rammer, 1990, Hjemmets bokforlag
- Milliardene som ble borte: en dokumentarroman, 1989, Damm
- If I only had a better boss: George Kenning on management, 1988, Damm
- Personalansvar, 1987, NKS-forlaget
- Leder og menneske, 1987, Hjemmets bokforlag
- Takk, bare bra, novel, 1986, Atheneum
- Menn gråter ikke, novel, 1984, Atheneum
- Administrasjon av personale, 1974, NKS-forlaget
- Mannen i midten: en formanns personalproblemer, 1972, NKS-forlaget
- Administrasjon av personale, 1971, NKS-forlaget
