= Christopher Hornsrud =

Norwegian politician

Coordinates: 59.9575°N 9.982778°E

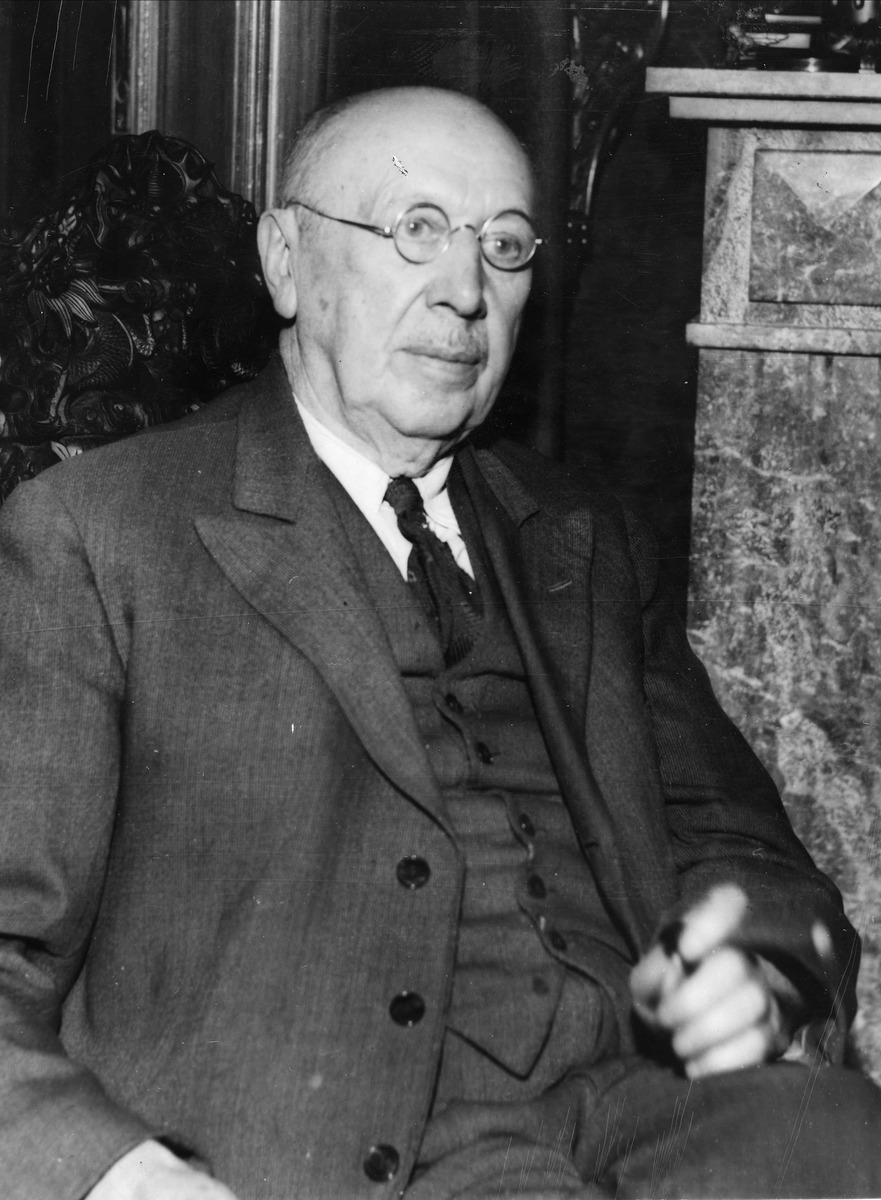
- Hornsrud in 1930

Prime Minister of Norway
- In office 28 January 1928 – 15 February 1928
- Monarch: Haakon VII
- Preceded by: Ivar Lykke
- Succeeded by: Johan Ludwig Mowinckel

Minister of Finance
- In office 28 January 1928 – 15 February 1928
- Prime Minister: Himself
- Preceded by: Fredrik L. Konow
- Succeeded by: Per Berg Lund

Vice President of the Storting
- In office 16 February 1928 – 10 January 1934
- President: C. J. Hambro
- Preceded by: Johan Ludwig Mowinckel
- Succeeded by: C. J. Hambro

Member of the Norwegian Parliament
- In office 1 January 1912 – 31 December 1936
- Constituency: Buskerud

Leader of the Labour Party
- In office 1903–1906
- Preceded by: Christian H. Knudsen
- Succeeded by: Oscar Nissen

Mayor of Modum
- In office 1 January 1909 – 31 December 1912

Personal details
- Born: Christopher Andersen Hornsrud; 15 November 1859 Skotselv, Øvre Eiker, United Kingdoms of Sweden and Norway
- Died: 12 December 1960 (aged 101) Oslo, Norway
- Resting place: Heggen kirkegård, Modum, Buskerud, Norway
- Party: Labour (1887–1959)
- Other political affiliations: Liberal (Before 1887)
- Spouse: Mathea Eriksdatter Nøkleby (1858-1947)
- Parent(s): Anders Christophersen Horsrud; Gunhild Dorthea Jellum
- Profession: Politician; Farmer; Store-owner

Christopher Andersen Hornsrud (15 November 1859 – 12 December 1960) was a Norwegian politician for the Labour Party. He served as leader of the Labour Party from 1903 to 1906 and became a member of the Storting in 1912. In 1928, he became the first Norwegian prime minister from the Labour Party and served as the 18th prime minister of Norway, but the cabinet had a weak parliamentary basis and was only in office for three weeks from January to February. He combined the post of prime minister with that of minister of Finance. After resigning he became vice-president of the Storting, a position he held until 1934.

Hornsrud was born in Skotselv, Øvre Eiker, and died in Oslo.

== Early life ==
Hornsrud was born in 1859 to Gunhild Dorthea and Anders Christophersen at the Horsrud farm in Skotselv, Eastern Norway, which had belonged his father's family in generations. His mother was originally from Åmot farm in Modum and after the death of his father when he was about six months old, Horsrud lived with his mother's family in Åmot until he was five years old and moved back to his mother in Skotselv. He had one older brother, Johan, which as odelsgutt was destined to take over the farm in Skotselv He attended a local school where the schedule was two weeks with education and two weeks off. Otherwise, he helped with the farm. While his home only had religious literature, a local library in Hokksund provided him with a wider set of books and also the weekly magazine Skilling-Magazin.

After confirmation, he stayed to work at the family farm while his elder brother studied at Jønsberg Agricultural School. In 1875, he got a position as assistant in a general store in Hønefoss, a town with about 1,100 inhabitants at that time. When the store owner died in 1878, Hornsrud together with another person bought the store.

== Political activities for the Liberal Party ==
Working in the shop brought him in contact with a wide array of local townspeople and farmers from neighboring areas and with the political discussion of the time. He became involved in the local Liberal association which was visited by known Liberal figures like Bjørnstjerne Bjørnson, Viggo Ullmann and Erik Vullum.

He was one of the founders of Buskerud Amts Venstreforening (Buskerud County's Liberal Society) in 1880.

In 1884, he moved to Vikersund where he was the manager and later owner of a store. There he continued his political involvement and was a member of Modum municipal council from 1883 to 1892. In 1891, he bought Åmot farm, the family farm of his mother's family. Among the issues he focused on was care for the elderly and he took initiative to remove the system where the elderly were placed among private persons for a fee and improved the local nursing home.

Together with others, he organized local Worker Societies (arbeiderforeniger) and in 1884, these formed Buskerud Amts Arbeiderforening (Buskerud County's Worker Society). The program of the latter included universal suffrage, no tariff for basic goods, progressive taxation and better primary education. The Worker Societies were associated with the Liberal Party, but the national worker meetings that were held also included participation of socialists like Carl Jeppesen and Christian Holtermann Knudsen. Hornsrud attended the national worker meetings in 1891 and 1892.

== Labour Party and national politics ==
In the 1890s, Hornsrud started considering himself a socialist and he attended the Labour Party's congresses from 1893 to 1896. He combined this for a while with continued membership in the Liberal Party. In 1901, he was elected member of the Labour party's committee on agricultural land.

To his own and many other's surprise, he was elected leader of the Labour Party in 1903. Horsrud represented a fraction of the party that was open to some co-operation with other parties, in particular the Liberal Party. His opponent, the incumbent Holtemann Knudsen, represented a more isolationist stance.

At the party congress in 1906, the party swung back to the isolationist stance and the congress passed a resolution saying that the party should never engage in electoral alliances with other parties. Hornsrud was not a candidate for a new period as leader, and was replaced by Oscar Nissen. He had become partly disillusioned with political work due to internal strifes and accusations that he was a "minister socialist" with too much sympathy for the Liberal party and seeking too much power in this own hands. He did not attend any more party congresses for a long time.

When Torgeir Vraa was elected to the Storting in 1905, Horsrud became interim editor of the Labour Party newspaper Fremtiden in Drammen. In 1909, he moved back to Modum where he once again became involved in local politics and served one year as mayor.

He also candidated for the Labour Party in the Parliamentary election in 1909, but was not elected for a seat. In the Parliamentary election in 1912 he did however succeed and aged 54, he entered the Storting as a member in 1913. He held the seat until 1936.

His main focus in the parliament was agriculture, particularly issues relating to the ownership of agricultural land and finances.

During World War I he was a member of the Supplies Commission (provianteringskommisjonen); being the first representative from the Labour Party to serve as a member of a public commission. He co-operated well with the Liberal leader and Prime Minister Gunnar Knudsen.

== Prime Minister and later parliamentary career ==
The 1927 parliamentary election was a victory for the Labour Party which won 59 of the 150 seats and became the parliament's largest group. The Conservative Prime Minister Ivar Lykke resigned on 20 January 1928. He recommended that the King ask the leader of the Centre Party, Johan Mellbye, to form a new cabinet. When Mellbye's attempt failed, the King called the Storting's president Carl Joachim Hambro and vice-president Hornsrud for consultation on 23 January. During the meeting with the King, Hornsrud expressed his view that it would be constitutionally most correct to ask the Labour Party as the largest party to form a cabinet, though he did not know whether the Labour Party would be able to form a cabinet.

On the advice of Hornsrud, the King contacted the leader of the Labour Party parliamentary group, Alfred Madsen. When Madsen subsequently asked the group whether the party should accept to form a cabinet, Hornsrud was among those who advocated strongest for a positive response. Others were more reluctant or negative. The central committee of the party decided that the party should take government responsibilities, but their first choice for Prime Minister Johan Nygaardsvold declined the offer to become prime minister. Hornsrud was then given the task. Hornsrud's Cabinet was appointed by the King on 28 January, making Hornsrud the first prime minister ever from the Labour Party. He took the position as Minister of Finance in addition to prime minister.

The cabinet was a minority cabinet with a weak parliamentary position. Its governing declaration (regjerinserklæring) which started by saying that the ultimate goal of the Labour Party was to create a socialist system in Norway was met with strong criticism from the other parties. The Labour cabinet also caused concern in the financial industry which was already struggling. Bergens Privatbank was one of the banks which was striving to survive. Governor of the Central Bank of Norway Nicolai Rygg requested that the government should pay for a guarantee fund for the banks and when Hornsrud declined, Rygg petitioned the leader of the Liberal Party Johan Ludwig Mowinckel and other non-socialist party leaders to cause the downfall of the Hornsrud cabinet. On 7 February, Mowinckel presented a motion of no confidence in the Storting. The next day the motion was approved with 86 votes against 63. Except for the members of the Labour Party only the three members of the Communist Party and one from the Radical People's Party voted against the motion. The government resigned on 15 February 1928.

In 1928, Hornsrud was elected vice-president of the Storting, a position he held until 1934. Hornsrud became a parliament appointed member of the chair (direksjonen) for Norges Hypotekbank in 1926, a bank which was designated to provide cheap loans to the agricultural sector. From 1936 to 1939, he served as chairman of the bank.

== Later life and death ==
After World War II Hornsrud continued to be involved in political debate. He was a strong opponent of militarism and Norwegian membership in NATO. He was one of the founders of the radical newspaper Orientering and participated in the choice of name for it.

Having died aged 101 years, Hornsrud is the longest living Norwegian Prime Minister ever.

== Publications ==
- Borgersamfundets bankerot' (1918)
- Fram til jorden! (1918)
- Hvorfor – fordi. Utredning av forskjellige skattespørsmaal (1928)
- Veien ligger åpen. Renter eller det daglige brød (1933)
- Christopher Hornsrud. Artikler, foredrag og intervjuer i utvalg. Selected collection of Hornsrud's articles, speeches and interviews by H. Johansen (1957)

Political offices
Preceded by Christian Holtermann Knudsen	Leader of the Labour Party; 1903–1906	Succeeded by Oscar Nissen
Preceded by Ivar Lykke	Prime Minister of Norway; 1928	Succeeded by Johan Ludwig Mowinckel
Records
Preceded by Pedro Lascuráin	Oldest living state leader 21 July 1952 – 12 December 1960	Succeeded by Venceslau Bras
