= Det Norske Arbeiderpartis Forlag =

Norwegian publishing company

Det Norske Arbeiderpartis Forlag was a Norwegian publishing house with connections to the Norwegian Labour Party.

It released publications by many of the party's most prominent politicians, and also released translated material from Karl Kautsky, Kropotkin, Clara Zetkin, Oscar Wilde and others.

In 1933 Kolbjørn Fjeld was hired as manager in the publishing house, but he was also tasked with setting up Tiden Norsk Forlag, which was established already in the same year. Tiden then became the main publisher of social-democratic literature.

According to the socialistic Norwegian Labour Movement Archives and Library, the publisher(forlag) was founded in 1918. Its first publication was The Communist Manifesto. The publisher later declined and moved into Tiden Norsk Forlag in 1933.
