= Hans G. Jensen =

Norwegian politician (1856–1922)

Hans G. Jensen (13 March 1856 – 7 September 1922) was a Norwegian trade unionist, politician, and tailor.

Jensen was born in Horsens, Denmark in 1856. He moved to Sandefjord, Norway in 1879, before settling in Kristiania in 1883. He became involved in the Norwegian labour movement, and was the leader of the Norwegian Labour Party from 1888 to 1889. He co-founded the Norwegian Union of Tailors in 1892, and became the first leader of the Norwegian Confederation of Trade Unions in 1899. He held this position until 1900.

Jensen died in Kristiania in 1922.

Party political offices
Preceded by Anders Andersen	Leader of the Norwegian Labour Party; 1888 – 1889	Succeeded by Christian Holtermann Knudsen
Political offices
Preceded by position created	Leader of the Norwegian Confederation of Trade Unions; 1899 – 1900	Succeeded by Dines Jensen
