= Ludvig Meyer =

Norwegian barrister, newspaper editor and politician

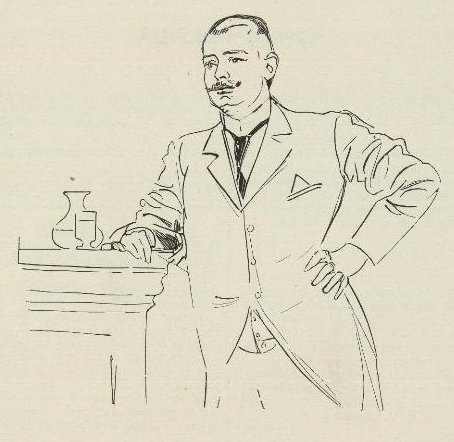
Ludvig Meyer by Christian Krohg

Ludvig Meyer (22 April 1861 – 3 January 1938) was a Norwegian barrister, newspaper editor and politician. He belonged to the Norwegian Labour Party 1891 to 1903, and was both party leader, party secretary as well as editor of the party organ Social-Demokraten for a period. Before this he had made his mark as the defender of writer Hans Jæger.

== Biography ==
Meyer was born in Borre, and was the older brother of Nanna Meyer. He graduated with the cand.jur. degree in 1882, and spent his professional life as a barrister, with access to Supreme Court cases, from 1886 to 1936. He became known as the defender of writer Hans Jæger in a high-profile case over censorship. Jæger's book Fra Kristiania-Bohêmen, published on 11 December 1885, was instantly banned by the Ministry of Justice for its indecency, and confiscated by the police. On 24 December a court order for Jæger was issued. In April 1886 he was sentenced to eighty days in jail and ordered to pay 80 kr of costs. The sentence was appealed, and with Meyer as the defender, the jail sentence was lowered to sixty days.

Politically Meyer belonged to the Liberal Party in the 1880s, but became disenfranchised with the party during the Hans Jæger case, citing that by censoring the book, the Liberal Party and its associated press did not live up to its name. In 1891 he joined the Norwegian Labour Party. He quickly rose to prominence within the young party; he became party leader in 1897, and the next year he became editor-in-chief of the party organ Social-Demokraten as well as party secretary. He was also a member of Kristiania city council.

In the 1890s Meyer had become wealthy due to real estate speculation. He spent money to prop up both the party newspaper and the party itself. Some within the Labour Party saw the party as being increasingly dependent on Meyer's funding, which led to unrest. When the booming real estate market in Kristiania busted in 1899, Meyer was hit hard. His political position was also affected, and in 1900 he lost the positions as both party leader, party secretary and editor of the party newspaper. When he subsequently left the Labour Party in 1903, this was described as a "political suicide" by some. In 1923 he briefly became a member of the newly founded Communist Party Historian Øystein Sørensen has described Meyer's later life as "vagrant", in the figurative sense.

== Works ==
- Tvungen mægling og voldgift (1914)
- Socialistisk beskatning og samfundsordning (1917)
- Kommunisme (1930)

Party political offices
Preceded by Carl Jeppesen	Chairman of the Labour Party; 1897–1900	Succeeded by Christian Holtermann Knudsen
Preceded by Oscar Nissen	Party secretary of the Labour Party; 1898–1900	Succeeded by Anders Buen
Media offices
Preceded by Oscar Nissen	Chief editor of Social-Demokraten; 1898–1900	Succeeded by Anders Buen
