= Jacob Vidnes =

Norwegian trade unionist, newspaper editor, politician and civil servant

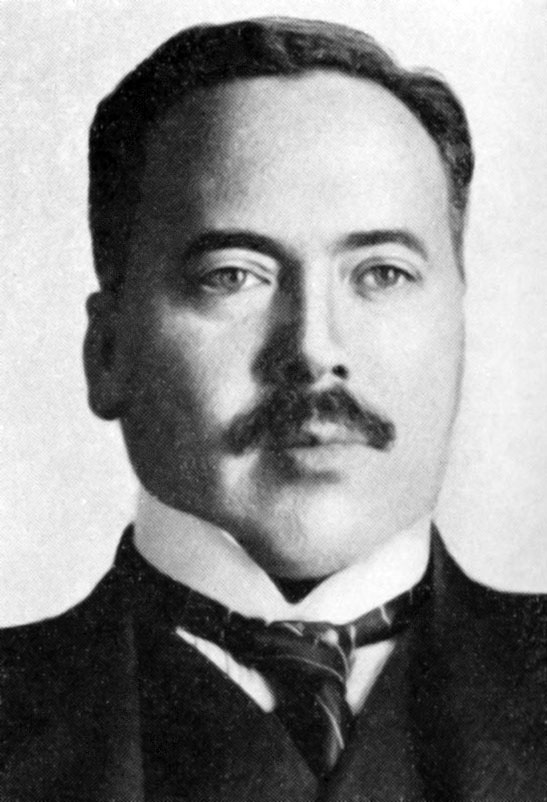
Jacob Laurentius Vidnes Portrait

Jacob Laurentius Vidnes (5 November 1875 – 4 October 1940) was a Norwegian trade unionist, newspaper editor, politician for the Labour Party and civil servant.

He was born in Vanylven Municipality as a son of farmer Knud Larsen Vidnes (1819–98) og Laurine Knudsdatter (1832–1910). In May 1929 he married hotelier's daughter Sigrid Birkeland (1900–1989), who after the death of Vidnes married Arne Ording.

He graduated from Volda Teachers' College in 1896, moved to Oslo as subeditor of Arbeideren in 1898 and was hired in the Labour Party main newspaper Social-Demokraten in 1899. In 1900 he was a co-founder and first chairman of Kristiania socialdemokratiske Ungdomslag. He was then one of the founders of Norges Socialdemokratiske Ungdomsforbund in 1903.

In 1909 he founded the trade union Norges Socialdemokratiske Presseforening, for all employees in the social democratic press. He was also a board member of the Norwegian Press Association. He had advanced to subeditor, and was from 1912 to 1918 the editor-in-chief of Social-Demokraten. He represented the Labour Party in Kristiania city council from 1914 to 1919, and was a member of its central board from 1912. From 1913 to 1918 he was also a member of the International Socialist Bureau.

In 1918 the radical wing of the Labour Party assumed control of the party at the national convention. Vidnes stepped down from the central committee, and from the positions as chairman of Socialdemokratiske Presseforening and chief editor of Social-Demokraten. In a piece called Arbeiderpartiet gaar helt over til bolsjevismen published in the right-wing newspaper Tidens Tegn in May 1919 he denounced the "Bolshevism" in the Labour Party.

In 1919 he was chosen by the Norwegian government as advisor at a League of Nations conference. The next year he was hired as head of the Ministry of Foreign Affairs press office. After the German invasion of Norway in 1940, he fled together with the government and royal family to London. Here, he was appointed editor of Norsk Tidend, the organ of the Norwegian cabinet-in-exile. He died in October 1940, after supervising only two issues.

Media offices
| Preceded by Carl Jeppesen | Chief editor of Social-Demokraten; 1912–1918 | Succeeded by Olaf Scheflo |
