= Gerda Grepp =

Norwegian journalist and translator

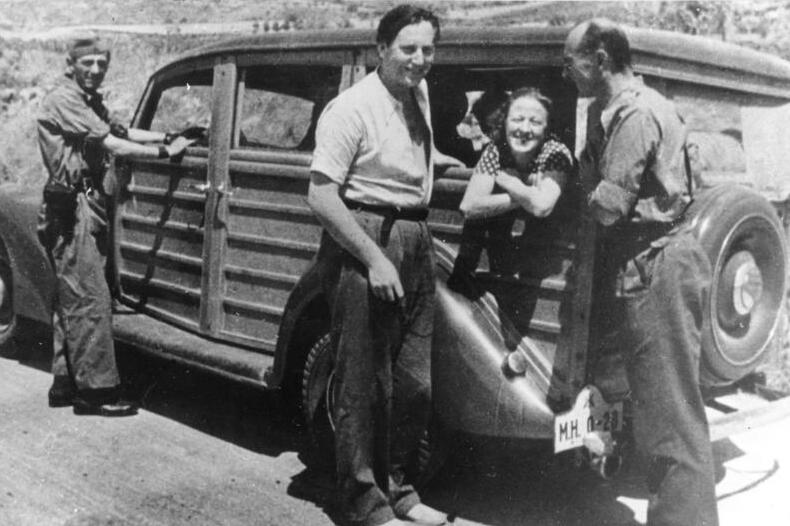
- Gerda Grepp, with Nordahl Grieg and Ludwig Renn
- Born: 26 May 1907
- Died: 29 August 1940 (aged 33); Norway
- Resting place: Vestre gravlund, Oslo, Norway
- Occupations: Journalist; War correspondent
- Relatives: Kyrre Grepp (father); Rachel Grepp (mother)

Gerda Johanne Helland Grepp (26 May 1907 – 29 August 1940) was a Norwegian translator, journalist, and socialist. She was the daughter of former chairman of the Norwegian Labour Party Kyrre Grepp and journalist Rachel Grepp.

She was married to Italian-Swiss potter Mario Mascarin (1901–66). They had a son Olav Kyrre (Ping) Grepp and a daughter, Solveig Marie Alexandra "Sacha" Grepp. The daughter was named after family friend Alexandra Kollontai.

== Spanish Civil War ==
Grepp covered the Spanish Civil War as a reporter for the Labour Party newspaper Arbeiderbladet from 1936. She arrived in Barcelona in October 1936, as the first female reporter from Scandinavia. She travelled to Madrid, where she experienced bombing attacks on the city. With Ludwig Renn she drove to the Toledo front. During her travels, she was also accompanied by her friend André Malraux. While in Spain, Grepp served as an interpreter for other Norwegians.

Both Grepp and the other Norwegian correspondents in Spain, like Nordahl Grieg and Nini Gleditsch, sympathized with the Republican cause in the war. Gleditsch and Grepp helped organize a large-scale aid effort for Spain, based around the Norwegian labour movement.

According to professor Rune Ottosen, Grepp and Birgit Nissen were marked with "sharp pens against the growing fascism".

In January and February 1937 she visited Málaga, together with Hungarian journalist and reporter for the British daily newspaper News Chronicle, Arthur Koestler. She and Koestler took shelter with the eccentric 72-year-old Sir Peter Chalmers Mitchell, who had stayed on in Málaga "to protect his house and servants" while his compatriots fled to Gibraltar. During the battle of Málaga she barely escaped the attacking Nationalist forces. Grepp left Málaga on 6 February, while Koestler was still in the city. On 7 February Italian troops occupied the city. Koestler was arrested, sentenced to death as a spy, and placed in a death cell in Sevilla. However, after considerable international pressure, he was released from custody. This episode is recorded in detail in Sir Peter's memoir, recently republished by The Clapton Press. From May 1937 Grepp spent several weeks in the Basque Country. She visited the Republican Basque Army defensive line called the Iron Belt, and experienced the Battle of Bilbao. Grepp frequently found herself in dangerous situations while in Spain. During her time in Spain Grepp was suffering from tuberculosis. Eventually she was compelled by her ill health to leave the war zone and return to Norway.

== Death and legacy ==
Gerda Grepp died of tuberculosis in German-occupied Norway on 29 August 1940, 33 years old. She was buried in Vestre gravlund in Oslo. Grepp's work has since been largely forgotten, her fellow journalist Lise Lindbæk instead being commonly seen as Norway's first female war correspondent.

A biography of Grepp, written by Elisabeth Vislie, was published in 2016.
