= Rachel Grepp =

Norwegian politician and journalist

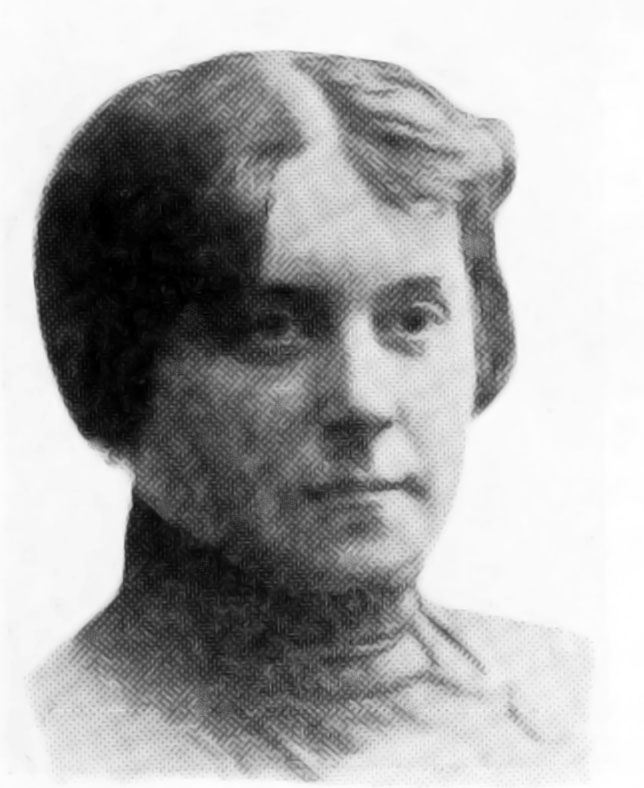

Rachel Catharina Helland Grepp, née Helland (5 March 1879 – 24 May 1961) was a Norwegian journalist and politician for the Norwegian Labour Party.

She was among the founders of Bergens Socialdemokratiske Ungdomslag in 1902. From 1923 to 1945 she was a journalist in Arbeiderbladet, a member of Oslo city council as well as international secretary and member of the women's secretariat in the Labour Party. These positions were de facto suspended from 1940 due to the German occupation of Norway.

She was the Labour Party's eighth ballot candidate in the 1924 parliamentary election and the eighth ballot candidate in the 1927 election. This time she was elected as fourth deputy.

She was married to Kyrre Grepp (1879–1922). Their daughter Gerda Grepp (1907–1940) was a Spanish Civil War correspondent, their son Ole Grepp (1914–1976) was an actor, and their son Asle Grepp (1919–1945) was executed as a Norwegian World War II resistance member.

A close friend of Alexandra Kollontai.
