= Bohemian Commandments =

List of Commandments

The Bohemian Commandments (Norwegian: Bohêmbud) or Nine Bohemian Commandments (Norwegian: Bohêmens ni bud) is a frequently cited text from the Kristiania Bohemian movement in Oslo:

1. Thou shalt write thine own life.
2. Thou shalt sever thy family roots.
3. Man kann seine Eltern nie slecht genug behandeln (Thou can not treat thy parents badly enough.)
4. Thou shalt never smite thy neighbor for less than five crowns.
5. Thou shalt hate and despise all farmers, such as Bjørnstjerne Bjørnson.
6. Thou shalt never wear celluloid cuffs.
7. Neglect not to make a scandal in the Christiania Theater.
8. Thou shalt never repent.
9. Thou shalt take thine own life.

The commandments come from an article published in Impressionisten no. 8 in February 1889, which is often attributed to Hans Jæger. However, in the biographical novel Jæger – en rekonstruksjon (Jæger: A Reconstruction), Ketil Bjørnstad writes that the journal's publisher, Johan Collett Michelsen, wrote the piece together with Oda and Christian Krohg as a parody of Jæger, with whom they were in dispute.
