= Per Wendelbo =

Norwegian newspaper editor

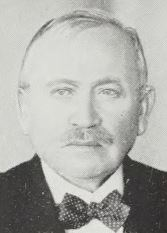
Per Wendelbo

Per Wendelbo (5 September 1866 – 26 February 1937) was a Norwegian newspaper editor.

He was born as Peder Haraldsen in Skien as a son of Peder Haraldsen, Sr. (1813–1887) og Caroline Mathilde Pedersen (1828–1907). In May 1890 in Kalmar he married Swedish citizen Ellen Lindquist (1865–1952).

He took the cand.jur. degree in 1889. He edited the weekly magazine Norske Gutter from 1897 to 1917, was the foreign affairs editor in Morgenbladet from 1900 to 1918, then editor and chief administrative officer of the Norwegian News Agency from 1918 to 1937. He also chaired the Norwegian Press Association from 1916 to 1919 and 1921 to 1923.

Media offices
Preceded by Hans Volckmar	Chairman of the Norwegian Press Association; 1916–1919	Succeeded by Carl Jeppesen
Preceded by Carl Jeppesen	Chairman of the Norwegian Press Association; 1921–1923	Succeeded by Thoralf Pryser
