= Ole Georg Gjøsteen =

Norwegian educator and politician

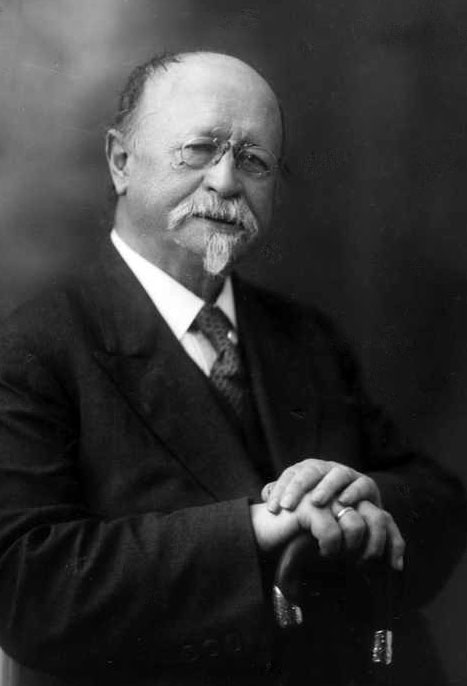
Ole Georg Gjøsteen

Ole Georg Gjøsteen (9 February 1854 – 19 June 1936) was a Norwegian educator and politician for the Norwegian Labour Party.

== Personal life ==
He was born in Stordøen Municipality, and was the older brother of politician and educationalist Johan David Haslund Gjøstein.

In October 1877 he married Emilie Josefine Sundbye. The couple had seven daughters and four sons.

== Career ==
An instrument maker by profession, Gjøsteen became involved in the growing worker's movement in Norway. He became a member of Kristiania Arbeidersamfund in 1871, and as political parties were established in the 1880s, Gjøsteen joined the radical wing of the Liberal Party. From 1888 to 1891 he chaired De forenede norske arbeidersamfund.

During this period Gjøsteen was among the founding members of the Norwegian Union of Iron and Metalworkers, and he also left the Liberal Party to found the more radical Norwegian Labour Party in 1887. He chaired this party nationally, from 1892 to 1893. He was elected to Kristiania city council in 1895, and served until 1919. Although not a member of Parliament, he marked himself as a proponent of universal suffrage and dissolution of the personal union between Sweden and Norway. General suffrage would be introduced in 1898 for men, and 1913 for women, whereas the union was dissolved in 1905.

In the field of education, Gjøsteen served as a member of the school board in Kristiania from 1896 to 1923, chairing it from 1914 to 1919. He worked to build the public primary school into a basis for further education, and to strengthen the secondary education. He strongly supported the idea of the comprehensive school, to the point of being called "the father of the comprehensive school in Norway".

Party political offices
Preceded by Carl Jeppesen	Chairman of the Norwegian Labour Party; 1892–1893	Succeeded by Gustav A. Olsen Berg
