= Nanna Meyer =

Norwegian jurist and civil servant

Johanne Marie "Nanna" Meyer (1863–1958) was a Norwegian jurist and civil servant.

She was born in Åsgårdstrand as the sister of Ludvig Meyer. She graduated with the cand.jur. degree in 1901, and was hired as a secretary in the Ministry of Justice and the Police in 1903. She was one of the main proponents of a law that granted women access to public offices; this went through in 1912. In 1916 she was promoted to head of department.
