= Carl Jeppesen =

Danish-born Norwegian worker, newspaper editor and politician

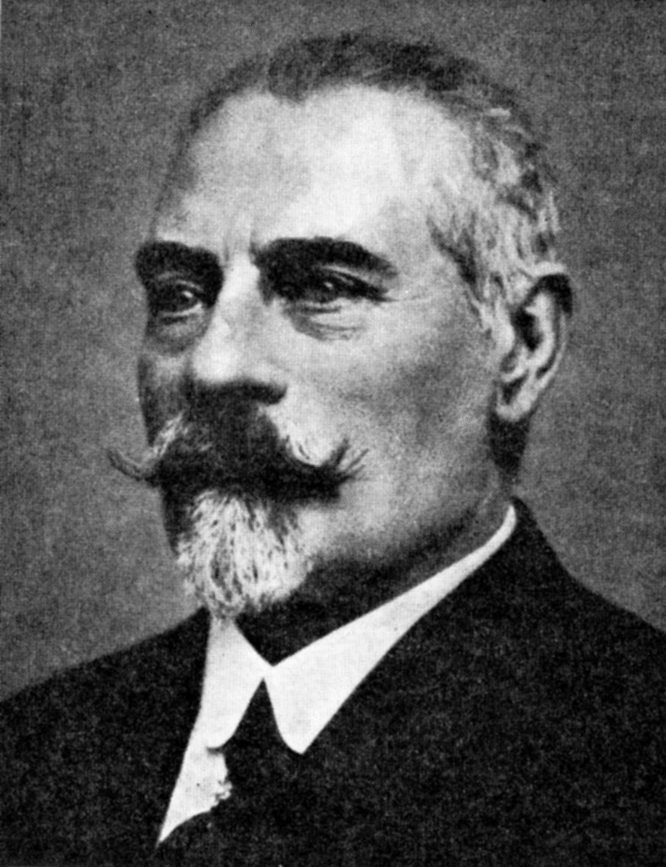
- Born: 16 March 1858; Copenhagen, Denmark
- Died: 26 January 1930 (aged 71); Oslo, Norway
- Occupations: Brushmaker, newspaper editor and politician
- Known for: Editor of Social-Demokraten; Mayor of Kristiania

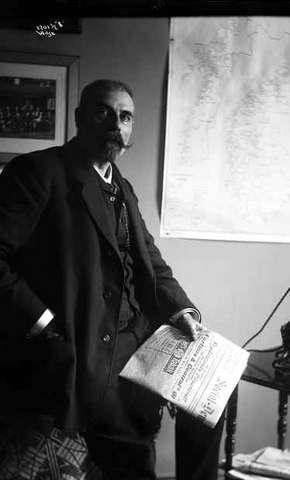
Jeppesen in 1908 with a copy of Social-Demokraten

Carl Jeppesen (16 March 1858 – 26 January 1930) was a Danish-born Norwegian worker, newspaper editor and politician. He edited the newspaper Social-Demokraten from 1887 to 1892, and from 1906 to 1912. He was among the founders of the Norwegian Labour Party, and served as chairman for two periods, from 1890 to 1892, and from 1894 to 1897. He was Mayor of Kristiania from 1917 to 1919.

== Personal life ==
Jeppesen was born in Copenhagen as the son of Jens Jeppesen and Marie Fredrikke Petrine Tauer. He grew up in Copenhagen with adoptive parents, having been adopted as a one-year-old child. He married Hulda Johanne Schmidt in 1878. He died in Oslo in 1930.

== Career ==
Jeppesen started working as a cigar riddler. After periods of unemployment he settled in Kristiania in 1878, working as brushmaker. He founded a brush factory in 1881, which he run along with his wife until 1887. In 1885 Jeppesen joined the organization Den socialdemokratiske Forening. From 1886 he chaired the organization and also edited the organization's newspaper Social-Demokraten (former Vort Arbeide) until 1892. He was a delegate to the founding meeting of the Norwegian Labour Party in Arendal in 1887, and was responsible for framing the party programme. In 1889 he organized the strike among the female match workers in Kristiania. He was chairman of the Norwegian Labour Party from 1890 to 1892. From 1892 he was running a cigar shop, but also contributed to the newspaper while Christian Holtermann Knudsen had taken over as editor. From 1894 to 1897 he was chairman of the Labour Party for a second period. He was a member of the Kristiania City Council from 1898 to 1925, and served as Mayor of Kristiania from 1917 to 1919. He also edited Social-Demokraten from 1906 to 1912. He was a co-founder of the Norwegian Press Association in 1910, and chaired this organization from 1920 to 1922. For the 1921 general election he was a ballot candidate for the Social Democratic Labour Party.

A collection of Jeppesen's articles, songs and poems was issued in 1951.

Political offices
Preceded by Peter Meinich	Mayor of Kristiania; 1917–1919	Succeeded by Haavard Martinsen
Party political offices
Preceded by Christian Holtermann Knudsen	Chairman of the Labour Party; 1890–1892	Succeeded by Ole Georg Gjøsteen
Preceded by G. A. Olsen Berg	Chairman of the Labour Party; 1894–1897	Succeeded by Ludvig Meyer
Media offices
Preceded by Christian Holtermann Knudsen	Chief editor of Social-Demokraten; 1887–1892	Succeeded by Christian Holtermann Knudsen
Preceded by Olav Kringen	Chief editor of Social-Demokraten; 1906–1912	Succeeded by Jacob Vidnes
Preceded by Per Wendelbo	Chairman of the Norwegian Press Association; 1920–1921	Succeeded by Per Wendelbo
