= Tiden Norsk Forlag =

Norwegian publishing company

- Parent company: Gyldendal Norsk Forlag
- Status: Active (operating as an imprint)
- Founded: 1933
- Founder: Norwegian Labour Party
- Country of origin: Norway
- Headquarters location: Sehesteds gate 4, Oslo
- Distribution: Forlagssentralen
- Publication types: Books
- Nonfiction topics: Fiction; General non-fiction; Poetry
- Fiction genres: Norwegian literature
- Official website: tiden.no

Tiden Norsk Forlag is a Norwegian publishing company owned by Gyldendal Norsk Forlag. It publishes fiction and general literature.

== History ==
Tiden was founded in 1933 by the Norwegian Labour Party. In 1936 it bought Fram Forlag. In the early years the largest authors were Aksel Sandemose and Lars Berg, with large names such as Alf Prøysen and Anne Cath. Vestly after the war. During the German occupation of Norway 1940-45 Tiden was the only publishing company closed by the German forces, with chairman Kolbjørn Fjeld being arrested in the fall of 1940. Large numbers of books were confiscated and destroyed.

In 1947 the company was reorganized with the Labour Party, the Norwegian Confederation of Trade Unions (LO) and Norwegian Union of Chemical Industry Workers as the largest owners. In 1991 Gyldendal took 91% ownership, while LO retained a 9% stake. In 2004 that stake was sold to Gyldendal, and the company was reorganized as a department of Gyldendal, though the brand remains. The children- and youth division of Tiden was merged with Gyldendal's to create Gyldendal Tiden ANS in 1996, though it was renamed Gyldendal Barn & Ungdom in 2004.
