= Fra Kristiania-Bohêmen =

Novel

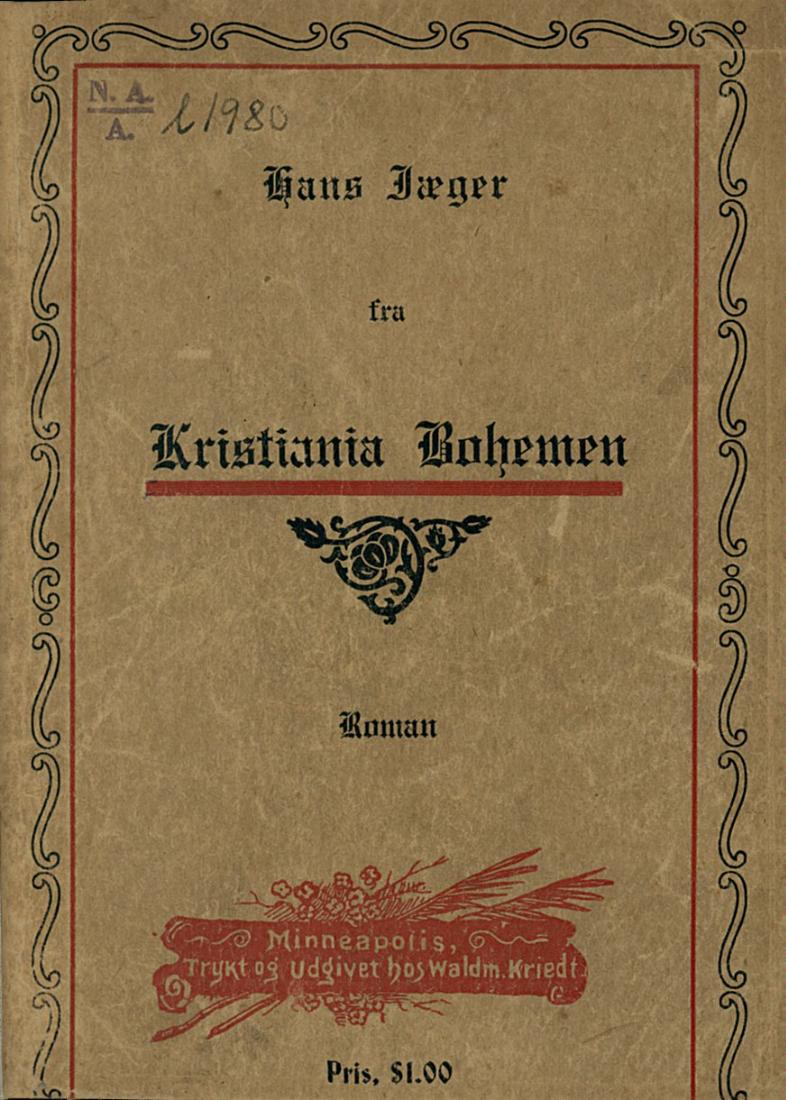
- Cover of Fra Kristiania-Bohêmen (1894) Minneapolis: Waldemar Didrik Kriedt Publishing
- Author: Hans Jæger
- Language: Norwegian
- Genre: novel
- Published: 1885
- Publication place: Norway

Fra Kristiania-Bohêmen (From Christiania's Bohemia) is a novel from 1885 by Norwegian writer Hans Jæger, a central figure of the Kristiania Bohemians. The book was confiscated shortly after its publication, and Jæger was sentenced to prison and lost his position as stenographer at the Parliament.

== Plot ==
"The future’s premature child," Hans Jæger had called the bohemian in the preface to his book Fra Kristiania–Bohemen (1885; From the Christiania Bohemia) which described the 'bohemians' as a small group of young intellectuals and artists out of step with a society that changed from day to day as modernisation and urbanisation advanced, but which was still marked by nineteenth-century bourgeois values and moral standards.

The novel is set in Christiania (Oslo), and deals with the everyday life of two friends, "Herman Ek" and "candidate Jarmann". They live in lodgings and spend their days drinking in cafés, discussing philosophy, literature and society reforms. "Jarmann" ends his life by committing suicide, shooting himself after spending his last night with a prostitute. The novel is a roman à clef, as the characters are easily recognizable as real people: "Ek" is Jæger himself, and "Jarmann" also has a corresponding real person.

== Confiscation and trial ==
The book was immediately banned by the Ministry of Justice, and the police managed to confiscate most of the printed copies shortly after its publication.

He lost his position as a stenographer at the Parliament of Norway.

Jæger was defended in court by barrister Ludvig Meyer.

Jæger was sentenced to sixty days imprisonment and a fine of 80 kr, for infringement of modesty and public morals, and for blasphemy. Jaeger had, a now-lost picture by Edvard Munch, with him in his prison cell while jailed, related to Edvard Munch: The Day After (1894); and Hans Heyerdahl: Mademoiselle with Champagne (1881).

He was also sentenced to 150 more days for printing the volume in Sweden. He avoided part of his imprisonment sentences by moving to Paris, where he spent most of the rest of his life.

The Supreme Court decision became the subject of a fierce debate. Liberal and conservative newspapers mostly supported the government's actions and the court decision, while intellectuals raised their voices in support of freedom of speech. The confiscation of Kristiania-Bohêmen sparked a debate on freedom of press in 1886 in the literary, cultural and political magazine Nyt Tidsskrift.

The novel gave its name to a literary movement in Norway in the 1880s (in Norwegian: bohembevegelsen), which included, in addition to Jæger, Christian Krohg, Gunnar Heiberg, Ludvig Meyer, Arne Garborg and others. Their "program" was based on naturalism, and also included elements of socialism and anarchism. Discussions on morals and sexuality had started early in the 1880s, and the debate became even more heated after the confiscation of Jæger's book in 1885, of Krohg's novel Albertine in 1886, and the imprisonment of Jæger.

== Re-issue ==
When the novel was re-issued in 1950, it spurred no debate or government action.

== See also ==
- Kristiania Bohemians
