= Kristiania Bohemians =

Norwegian political & cultural movement

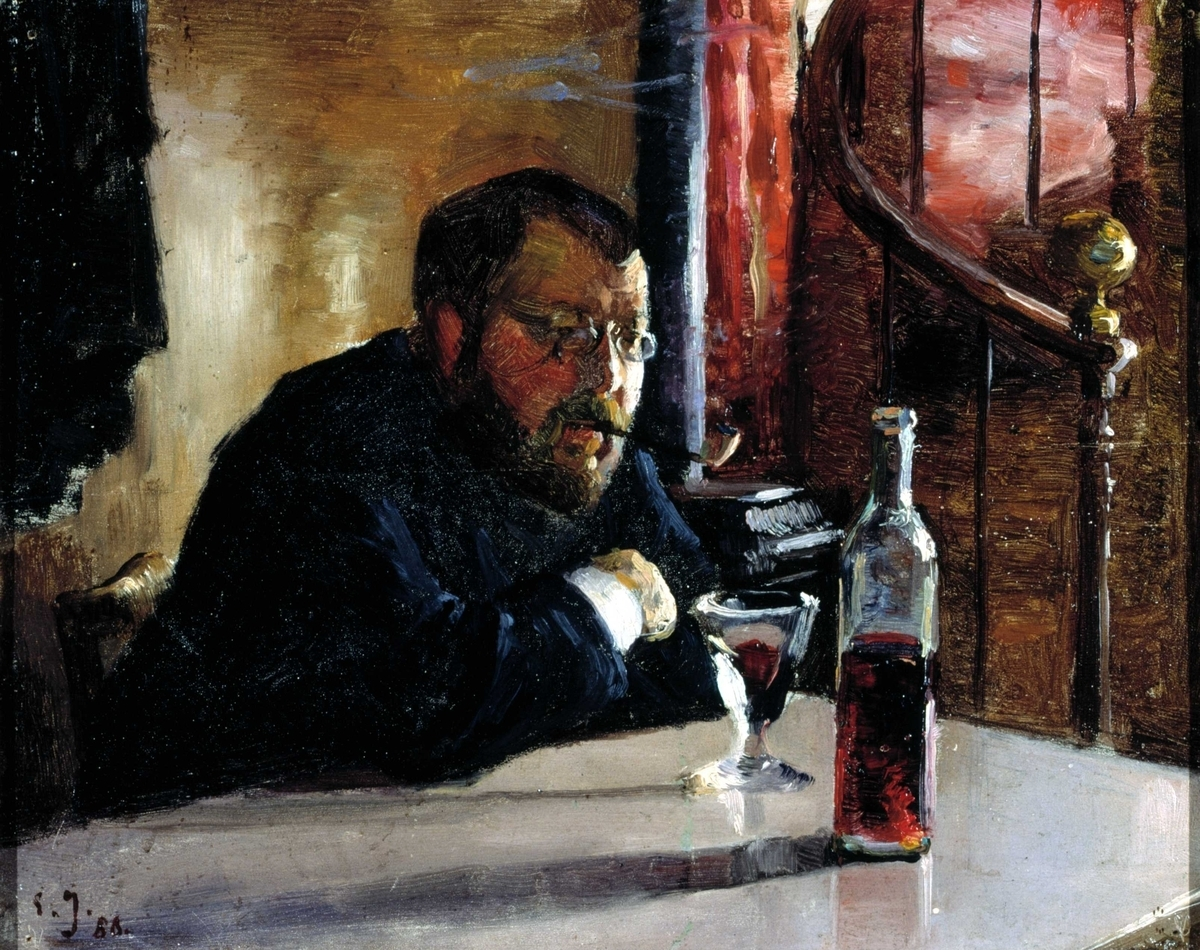
Portrait of Hans Jæger, 1888, by Sven Jørgensen

The Kristiania Bohemians (Norwegian: Kristiania-bohemen) were a political and cultural movement in the 1880s centered in Kristiania (now Oslo). Hans Jæger was the central figure in the movement, and other prominent members included Christian Krohg, Oda Krohg, Jon Flatabø, Haakon Nyhuus, Edvard Munch, and Nils Johan Schjander. The Kristiania Bohemians were naturalist artists and belonged to the period of naturalism, but the clear emphasis that they placed on feelings also points towards the next literary period, neo-romanticism. The movement consisted of about twenty men and a few women, and others loosely associated with the movement, such as Arne Garborg.

The Kristiania Bohemians are also known for their nine Bohemian Commandments, which had its origins in an article published in Impressionisten no. 8 in February 1889 and is often attributed to Hans Jæger. However, in the biographical novel Jæger – en rekonstruksjon (Jæger: A Reconstruction), Ketil Bjørnstad writes that the journal's publisher, Johan Collett Michelsen, wrote the piece together with Oda and Christian Krohg as a parody of Jæger, with whom they were in dispute.

== See also ==
- Fra Kristiania-Bohêmen, 1885 novel by Hans Jæger, which was confiscated shortly after its publication
