= Anders Andersen (Norwegian politician) =

Founder of the Norwegian Labour Party

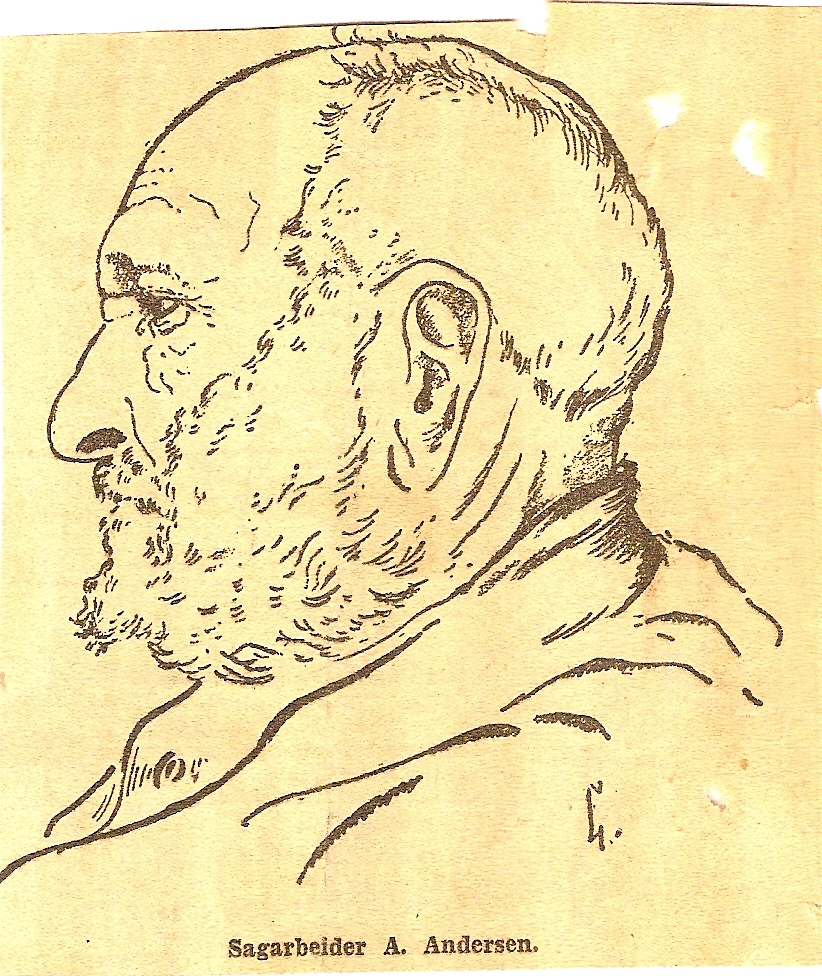
- Born: 22 October 1846 near Hønefoss, Sweden–Norway
- Died: 1 September 1931 (aged 84)
- Known for: Co-founder of the Labour Party
- Political party: Labour

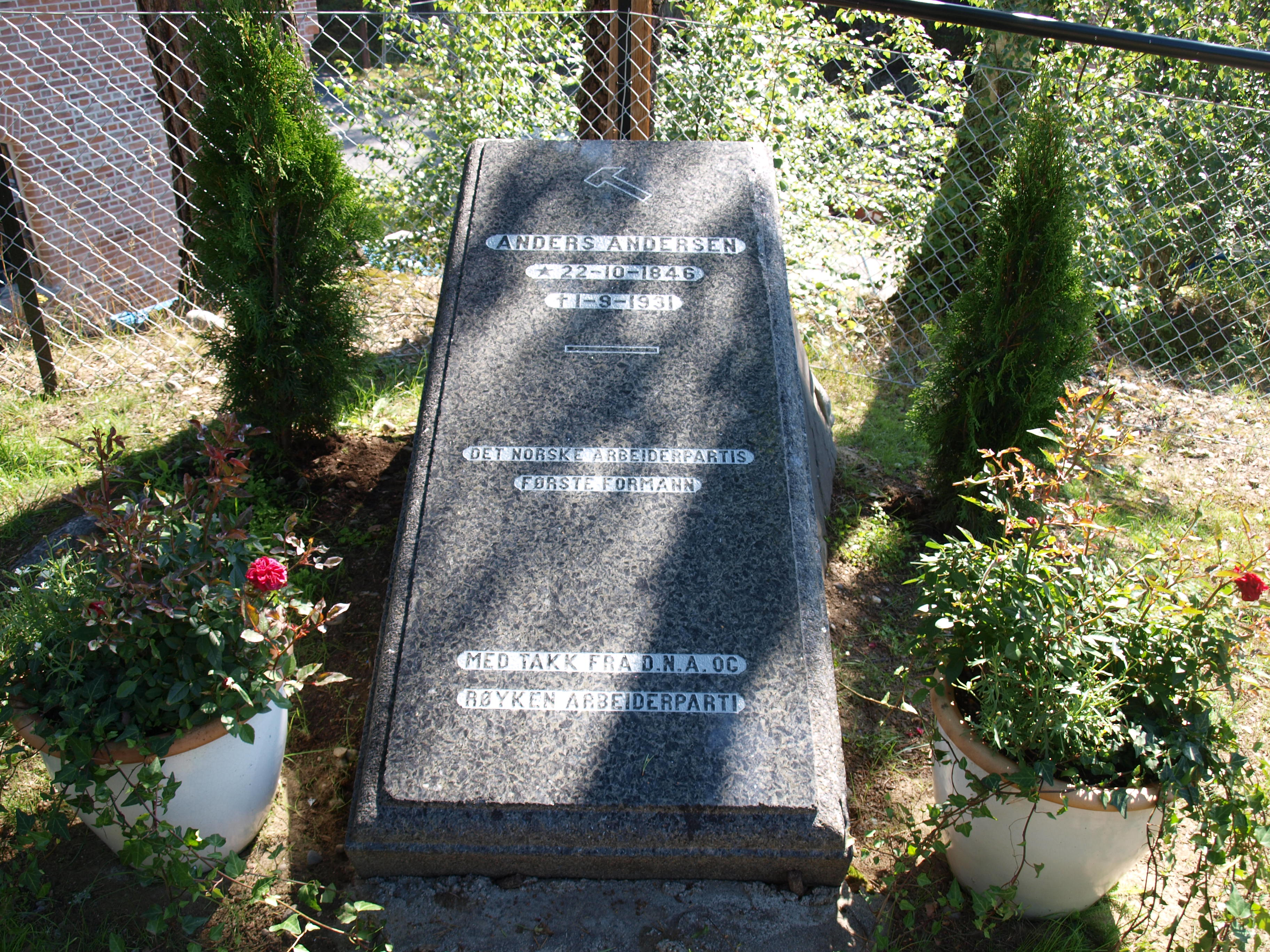
Anders Andersen headstone

Anders Andersen (22 October 1846 – 1 September 1931) was a sawmill worker who participated in forming the Norwegian Labour Party.

Anders Andersen was born just outside Hønefoss in Ringerike, Sweden-Norway. Around 1868, he moved to Arendal in Aust-Agder and lived there for 20 years. He was member of a recently founded local labour group called Samhold when he somewhat coincidentally became the first party leader in 1887. The labour group Samhold soon after ceased to exist due to local circumstances and it was not represented at the next party congress.

In 1889, Andersen moved from Arendal and settled at Røyken in Buskerud where he worked as a farm manager. He continued to be active in the labor movement, as a member of the municipal council and trade unionist. Not even among his colleagues in Røyken was it commonly known that he had been the first leader of the Labour Party. Anders Andersen died in 1931 near 85 years of age. After his death, the Labour Party paid for a headstone on his grave. The memorial has later been moved to Kistefos museum at Jevnaker in Oppland. He is honored each year on 1 May.
