= 1909 Norwegian parliamentary election =

- 2−25 October 1909

All 123 seats in the Storting 62 seats needed for a majority
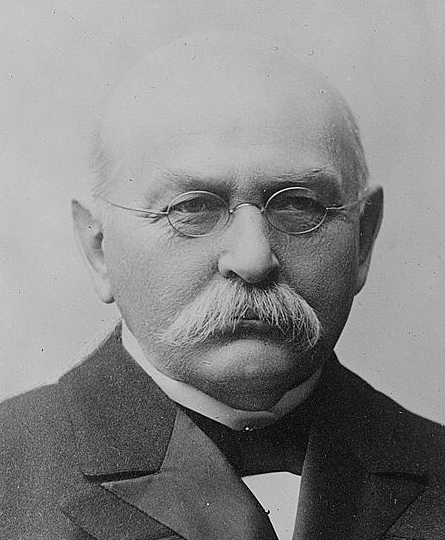

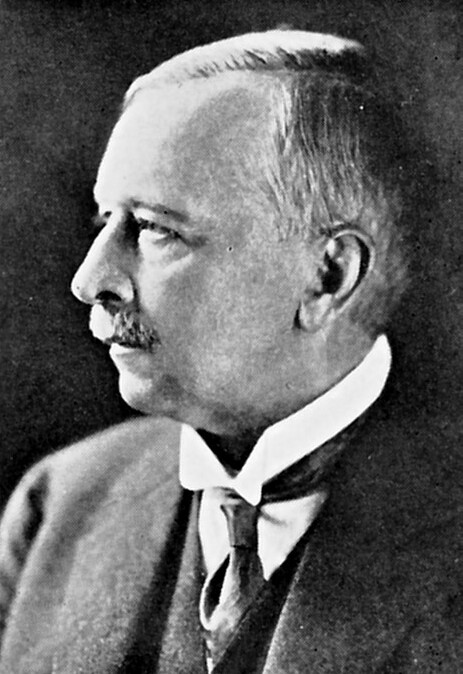

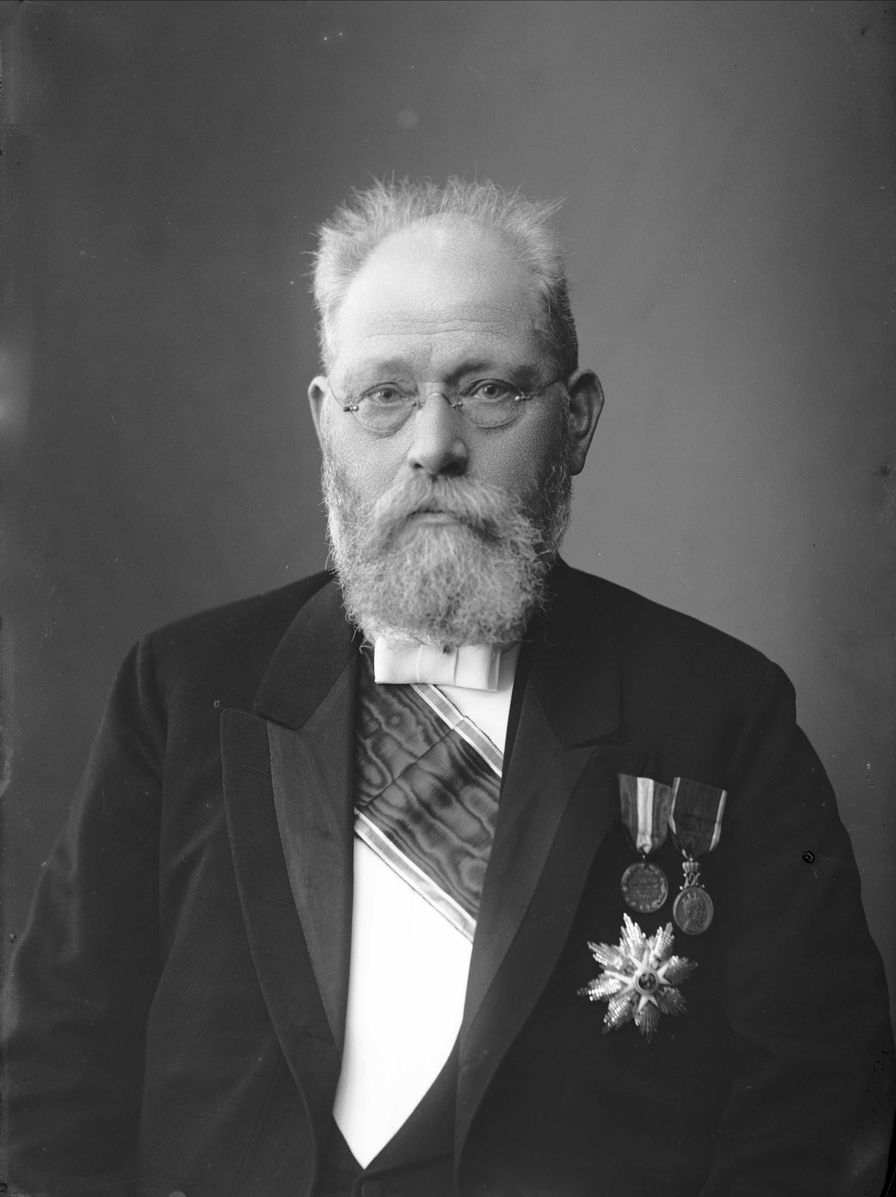

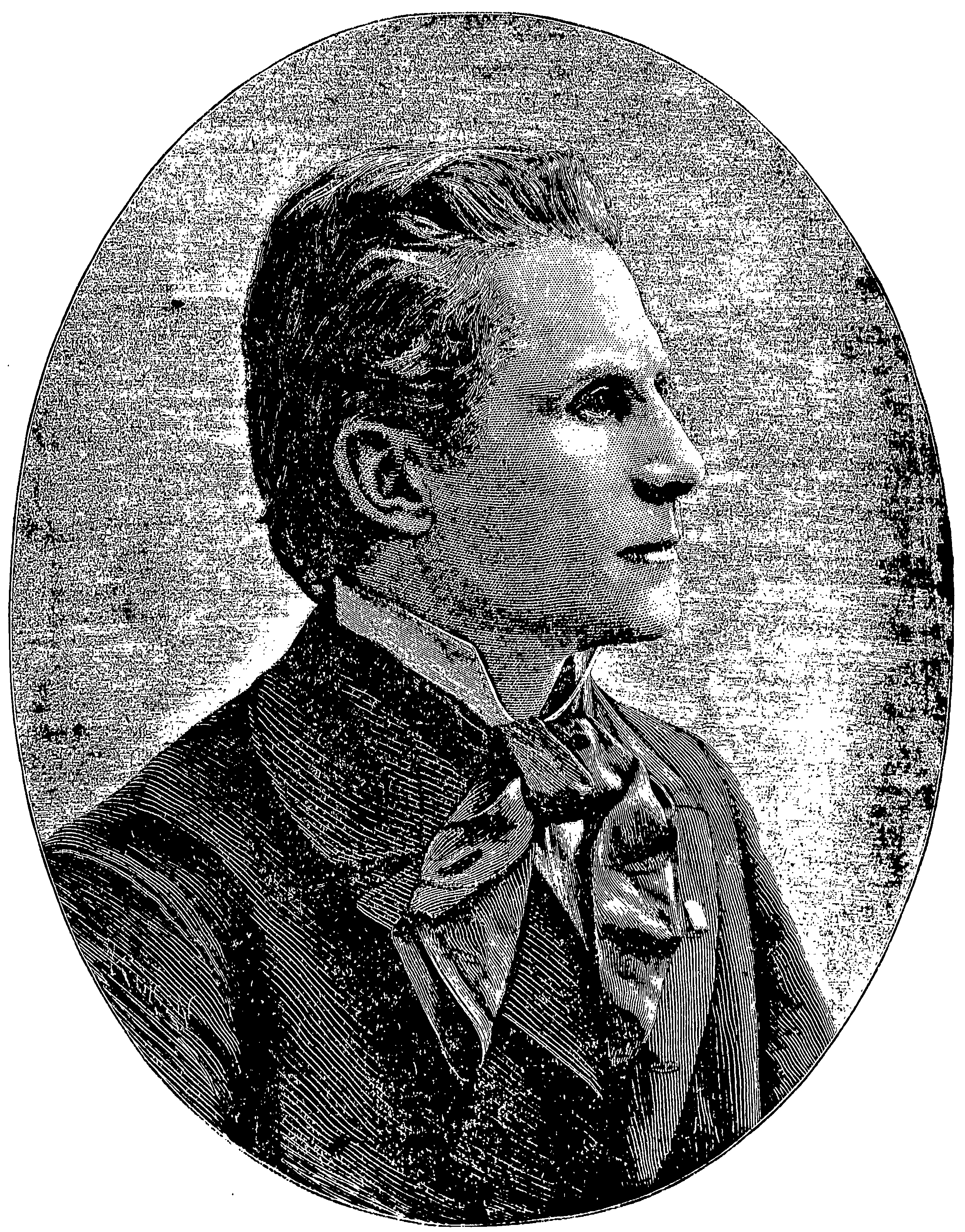

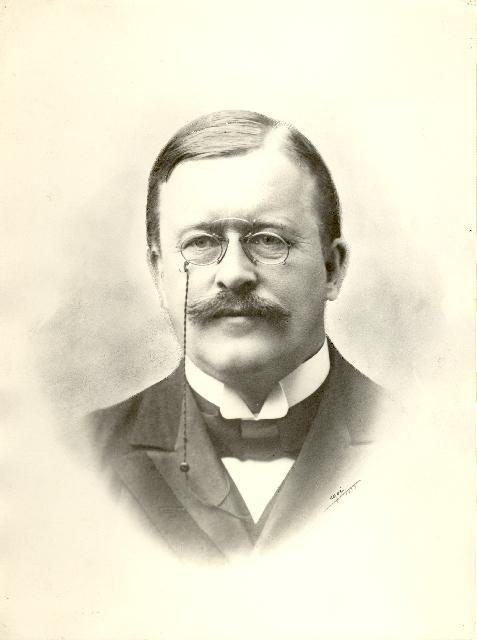
	First party	Second party	Third party
Leader	Gunnar Knudsen	Fredrik Stang	Abraham Berge
Party	Liberal	Conservative	Free-minded Liberal
Last election	45.14%, 73 seats	32.80%, 36 seats (Note: As Coalition Party)	–
Seats won	46	41	23
Seat change	▼27	▲5	New
Popular vote	128,367	175,388 (H+FV)	Alliance with H
Percentage	30.37%	41.49% (H+FV)	—
	Fourth party	Fifth party
Leader	Oscar Nissen	Johan Castberg
Party	Labour	Labour Democrats
Last election	16.02%, 10 seats	4.76%, 4 seats
Seats won	11	2
Seat change	▲1	▼2
Popular vote	91,268	15,550
Percentage	21.59%	3.68%
Prime Minister before election
Gunnar Knudsen
Liberal
Prime Minister after election
Gunnar Knudsen
Liberal

Parliamentary elections were held in Norway between 2 and 25 October 1909, with a second round held between 18 October and 11 November. The result was a victory for the alliance of the Conservative Party and the Free-minded Liberal Party, which won 64 of the 123 seats in the Storting.

== Results ==
Party	Votes	%	Seats	+/–
Conservative Party	175,388	41.49	41	+5
Free-minded Liberal Party	175,388	41.49	23	New
Liberal Party	128,367	30.37	46	–27
Labour Party	91,268	21.59	11	+1
Labour Democrats	15,550	3.68	2	–2
Teetotaler Party	5,076	1.20	0	–
Church Party	3,748	0.89	0	–
Independent Left Party	2,267	0.54	0	–
Other parties	942	0.22	0	–
Wild votes	78	0.02	–	–
Total	422,684	100.00	123	0
Valid votes	422,684	98.30		
Invalid/blank votes	7,294	1.70		
Total votes	429,978	100.00		
Registered voters/turnout	760,277	56.56		
Source: Nohlen & Stöver

=== National daily newspapers ===
Newspaper	Party endorsed	Notes
Bratsberg-Demokraten	Labour Party	
