= Gustav A. Olsen-Berg =

Norwegian typographer and politician

Gustav A. Olsen-Berg (March 31, 1862 – August 19, 1896) was a Norwegian typographer and politician (Norwegian Labour Party). He was the chairman of the Norwegian Labour Party 1893–1894.

== Work ==
- 1891: Editor-in-chief of Typografiske Meddelelser
- 1893-1894: Chairman of the Norwegian Labour Party
- 1896: Chairman of Typografisk forening
