= Kolbjørn Fjeld =

Norwegian librarian and publisher (1901–1978)

- Born: 4 June 1901; Eidskog, Norway
- Died: 4 May 1978 (aged 76); Oslo
- Education: Columbia University
- Occupations: Librarian and publisher
- Employer(s): Deichmanske bibliotek Tiden Norsk Forlag

Kolbjørn Fjeld (4 June 1901 – 4 May 1978) was a Norwegian librarian and publisher. He chaired the publishing house Tiden Norsk Forlag between 1933 and 1971.

== Biography ==
Fjeld was born in Eidskog Municipality on 4 June 1901, a son of schoolteacher Ole Fjeld and Sofie Gundersen. In 1933 he married dentist Randi Utheim Medbø.

He worked for the library Deichmanske bibliotek from 1919 to 1933. He graduated as a Master of Science from the Columbia University in 1930. From 1933 to 1971 he chaired the publishing house Tiden Norsk Forlag (except during World War II, when the occupants had the company closed).

He died in Oslo on 4 May 1978.
