= Nils Johan Schjander =

Nils Johan Schjander (1859 – October 18, 1903) was a Norwegian engineer and a member of the movement known as the Kristiania Bohemians. He is known for having taken part in a journey to Patagonia and writing a diary, published as En reise til Patagonia (A Journey to Patagonia). For the Kristiania Bohemians, Patagonia was a promised land where several dreamed of creating a free state. Schjander was involved in surveying and mapping Patagonia on behalf of the Argentine Southern Land Company between 1889 and 1891.
