= Hans Jæger =

Norwegian anarchist (1854–1910)

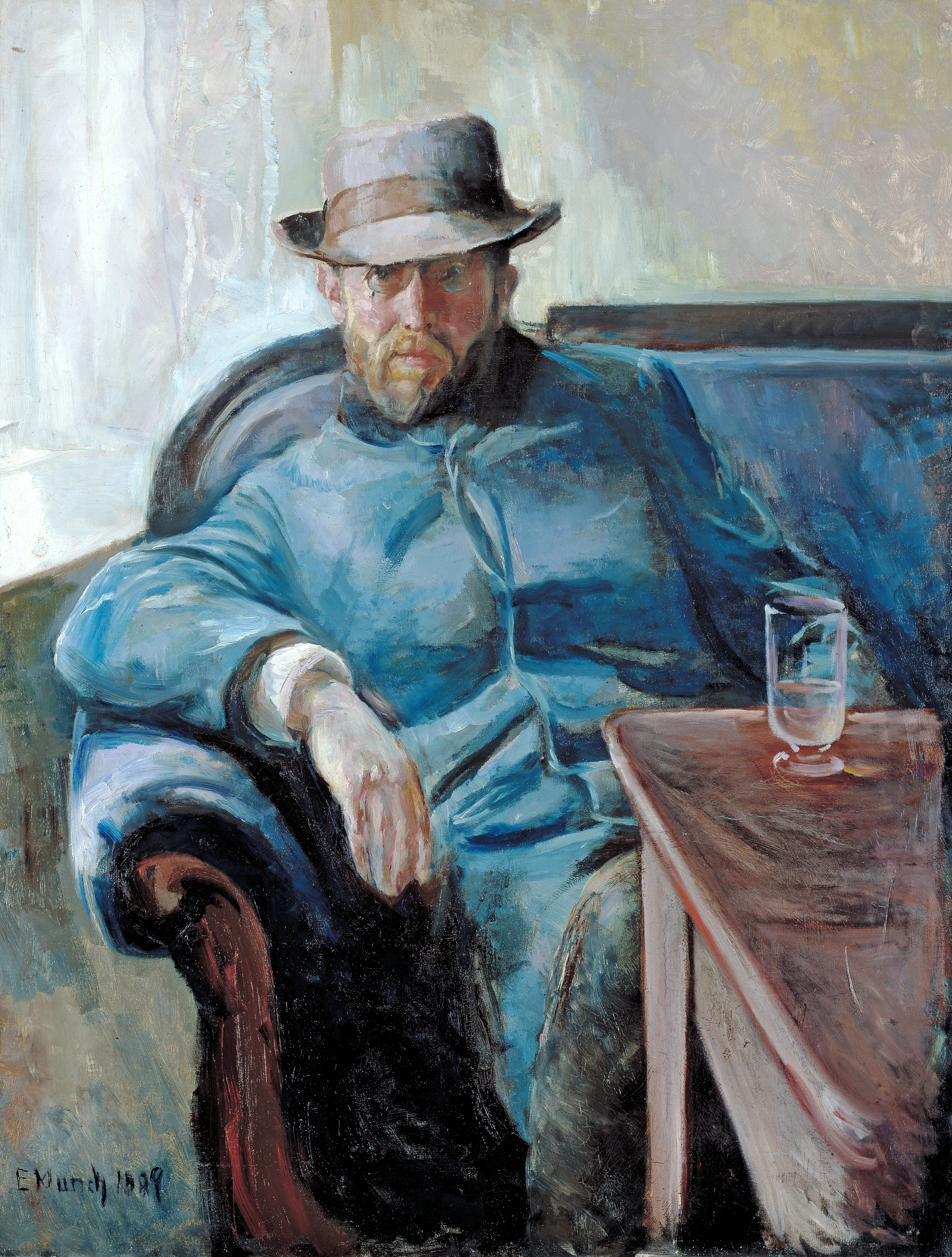
- Portrait of Hans Jæger by Edvard Munch (1889)
- Born: Hans Jæger; 2 September 1854; Drammen, Norway
- Died: 8 February 1910 (aged 55); Oslo, Norway
- Occupations: writer, philosopher, activist

Hans Henrik Jæger (2 September 1854 – 8 February 1910) was a Norwegian writer, philosopher and anarchist activist who was part of the bohemian group known as the Kristiania Bohemians.

== Biography ==
Hans Henrik Jæger was born on 2 September 1854 in the Norwegian city of Drammen. Soon after his birth, his family moved to Bergen, where his father worked as a police officer. Jæger's father died when he was only 10 years old and his mother died when he was 14, forcing Jæger to move in with his uncle, Niels Matthias Aalholm, in Arendal. The following year, Jæger began a career as a sailor, which took him to France and the United States. By the time he left the shipping business in 1874, he had risen through the ranks to become second mate on a packet boat. Planning to become a schoolteacher, he enrolled in the University of Oslo and began studying philosophy. To pay for his studies, he found a job as a clerk in Storting.

In 1878, Jæger anonymously published a treatise in which he attempted to refute the existence of God and the soul, drawing from the rationalist philosophy of Emmanuel Kant and the dialectical logic of Georg Wilhelm Friedrich Hegel. During this time, he also came under the influence of Johann Gottlieb Fichte, whose ideas on natural law and individual liberty inspired him. Jæger became famous in the Norwegian capital in 1881, after he gave a series of speeches arguing for the extension of civil rights to sex workers, for the abolition of marriage and social injustice, and for the practice of free love and socialism. At the Norwegian Students' Society, he gave lectures on the subject of determinism and free will. In 1883 and 1884, he wrote the realist plays Olga and En intellektuel forførelse; he hoped to undermine the existing social system by using his art to expose social realities.

In December 1885, he published his first major work, Fra Kristiania-Bohêmen. He explicitly conceived the book as an attack against traditional morality, Christianity and retributive justice, which he hoped would be overthrown in a social revolution. The Norwegian authorities immediately prohibited publication of the book and arrested Jæger, who they sentenced to 60 days in prison, ostensibly on charges of publishing "pornography". This led to a debate in Norwegian civil society over freedom of the press, with many liberal students criticising the liberal government of Johan Sverdrup for the suppression of the book. When Jæger was sentenced again for attempting to reprint the book the following year, he initially fled the country to Paris, but ultimately returned to Norway to serve his sentence. After his release from prison, in 1890, he returned to Paris and got a job in insurance. During this time, Jæger had an affair with Oda Krohg, which formed the basis for a trilogy of novels (Syk kjærlihet, Bekjendelser, and Fængsel og fortvilelse) which were banned in Norway for their sexually explicit content.

From Paris, he worked as a foreign policy correspondent for the Swedish newspaper Social-Demokraten, and upon his return to Norway in 1898, he was appointed as the newspaper's foreign editor. Around this time, Jæger became an anarchist and grew increasingly critical of his more moderate contemporaries. In 1902, he returned to Paris. In 1906, he published Anarkiets bibel, in which he outlined the contradictions of capitalism and his view of how to establish an anarchist society, without private property or competition. In 1907, he moved to Copenhagen, where he published the magazine Korsaren, which aligned itself against social democracy and parliamentary politics. After the magazine ceased publication and a short-lived anarchist organisation he founded collapsed, he returned to Oslo, where he died from cancer on 8 February 1910.

== Selected works ==
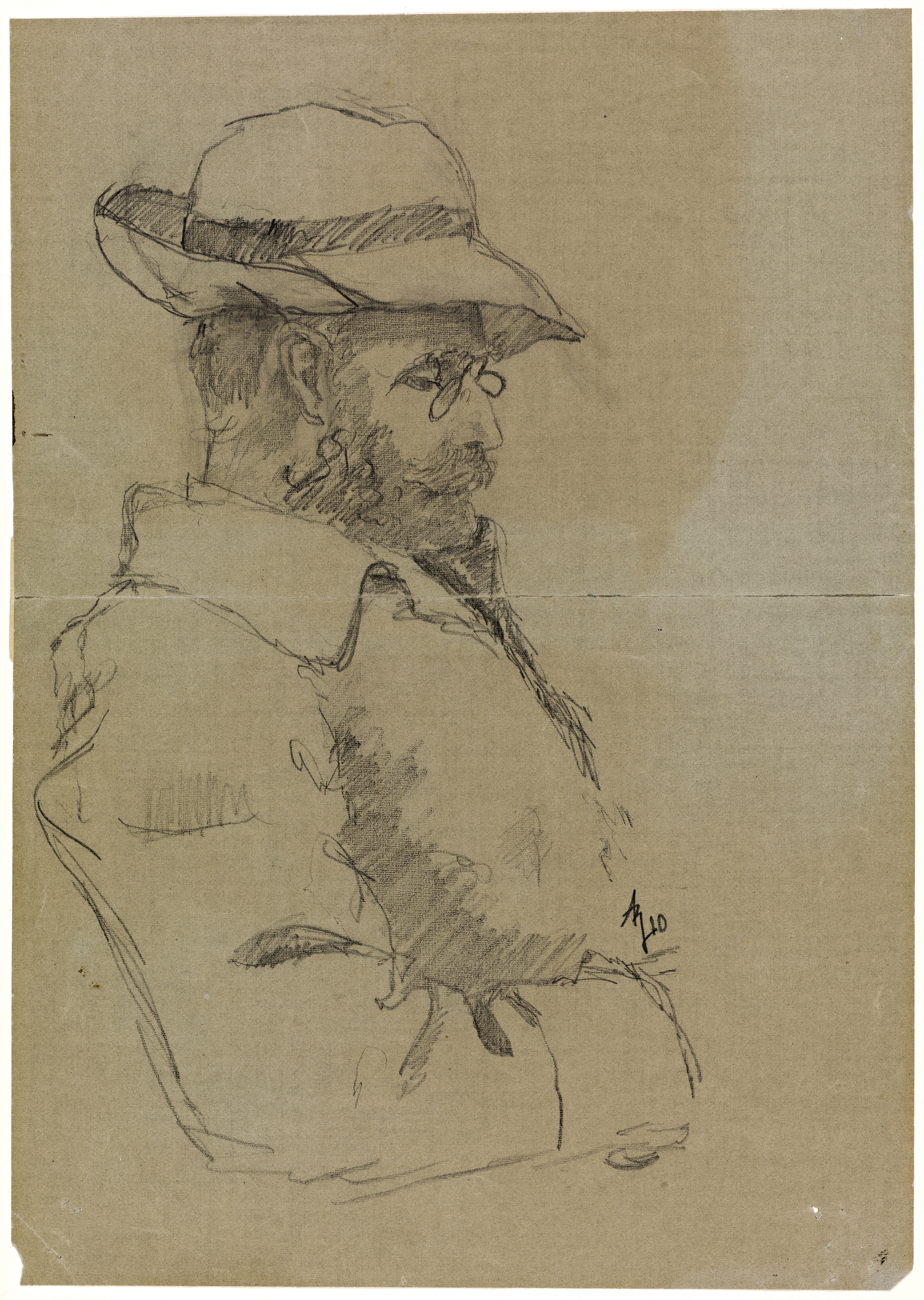
Portrait of Hans Jæger by Andreas Bloch (1910)

- Kants fornuftskritik (Kant's critique of pure reason) 1878
- Olga (play) 1883
- En intellektuel Forførelse (play) (An Intellectual Seduction) 1884
- Fra Kristiania-Bohêmen (From the Christiania Bohemians) 1885
- Julefortællinger av Hans Jæger (Christmas Stories by Hans Jæger, in reality the second volume of From the Christiania Bohemians) 1886
- Albertine (with Christian Krohg) 1886
- Min forsvarstale i høyesterett (My Defence Speech in the Supreme Court) 1886
- Kristianiabilleder (Images of Christiania) 1888
- Novelletter (Short Stories) 1889
- Bohemens erotiske bekjennelser (The Erotic Confessions of the Bohemians)
  - Syk kjærlihet (part 1 of 3) 1893 (Twisted Love)
  - Bekjendelser (part 2 of 3) 1902 (Confessions)
  - Fængsel og fortvilelse (part 3 of 3) 1903 (Prison and Despair)
- Anarkiets bibel (Anarchists' Bible) 1906 (via: archive.org)
- Socialismens ABC (written between 1906 and 1910, never finished) (The ABC of Socialism)

== Bibliography ==
- Fagerhus, Harald (2002). "Hans Jaeger and the Kristiania-bohemes". Norwegian Anarchism and Syndicalism during 100 years. Translated by Altemark, Mikael. OCLC 83102719 – via Anarchy Archives.
- Jensen, Lill-Ann (16 September 2024) [2009-02-14]. "Hans Jæger". In Bolstad, Erik (ed.). Norsk biografisk leksikon (in Norwegian). Oslo: Kunnskapsforlaget.
- Refsum, Christian (2025). "Norwegian Oversharing? Hans Jæger, Agnar Mykle and Karl Ove Knausgaard". In Neumann, Iver B. (ed.). Knausgaard in context. pp. 29–52. doi:10.18261/9788215068916-25-02. ISBN 978-82-15-06890-9.
