= Kyrre Grepp =

Norwegian politician

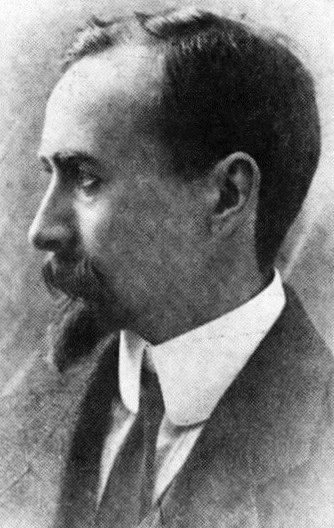

Olav Kyrre Grepp (6 August 1879 – 6 February 1922) was a Norwegian politician, leader of the Norwegian Labour Party. Grepp became a Communist by the end of his life and was active in the Comintern.

He studied literature and philosophy, however he became increasingly politically active. Grepp was elected after university studies in the Labor Party's central board in 1912. He was in favor of revolutionary tactics and strengthening the labor movement's extra-parliamentary aids and in 1918 pushed through the Labor Party's accession to the Communist International.

As the party's leader, despite cooperation with Moscow, Grepp managed to preserve some independence for the party. As an organizer and tactician, Grepp was probably one of the foremost in the Norwegian labor movement.

From 1904 he was married to the journalist Rachel Grepp and together they had five children, including the journalist Gerda Grepp. In his last years, Grepp was plagued by illness, and he gave his last public speech in 1920. He died of tuberculosis in 1922.

A street is named after Grepp in the Sagene borough of Oslo.

He was married to Rachel Grepp, with whom he had a daughter, Gerda Grepp.
