= Oscar Nissen =

Norwegian physician, newspaper editor and politician (1843–1911)

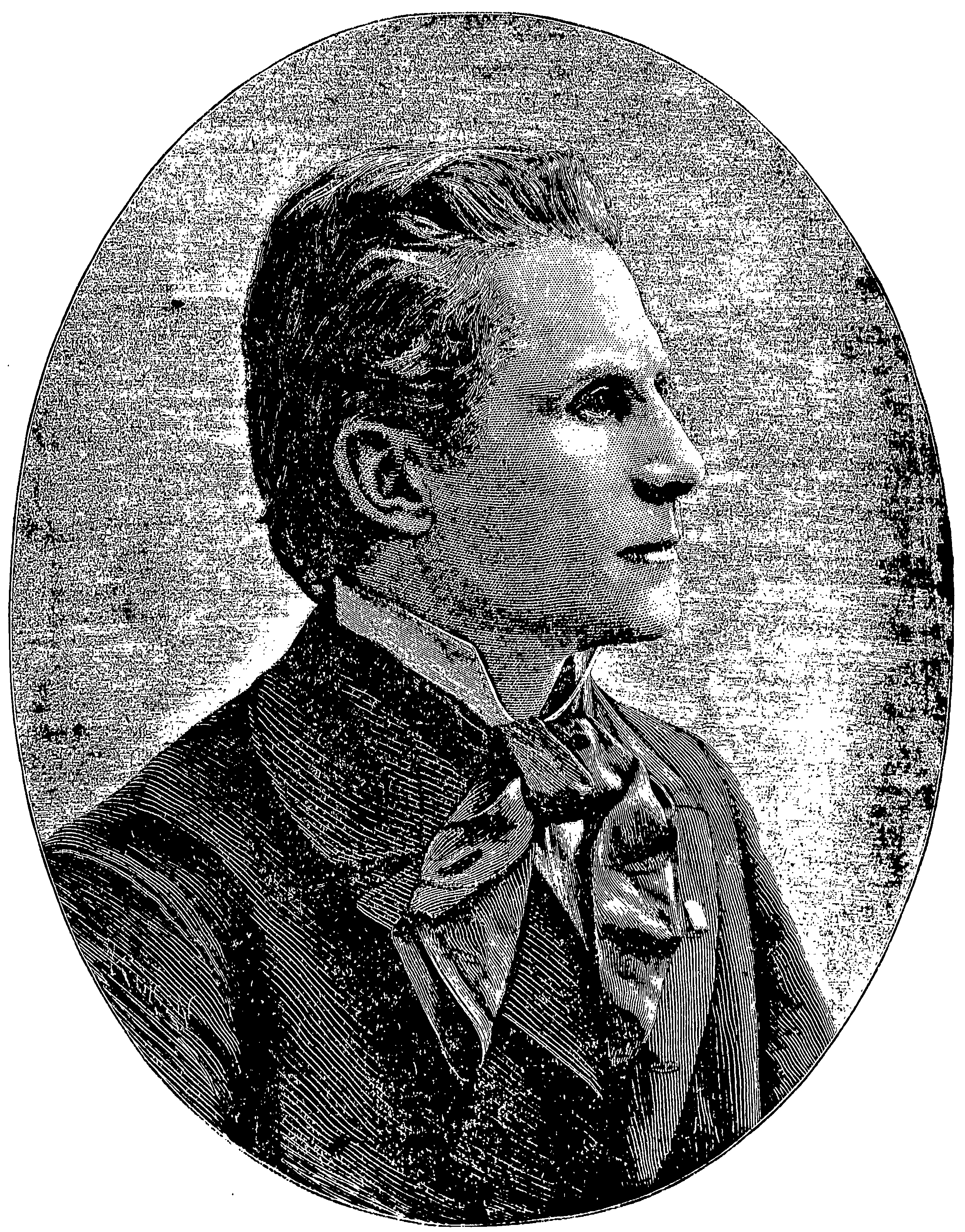

Chairman of the Norwegian Labour Party
- In office 1906–1911
- Preceded by: Christopher Hornsrud
- Succeeded by: Christian Holtermann Knudsen

Personal details
- Born: Elias Gottlieb Oscar Egede Nissen; 31 October 1843 Tromsø, Norway
- Died: 4 January 1911 (aged 67) Kristiania, Norway
- Party: Norwegian Labour
- Other political affiliations: Liberal Party of Norway
- Spouses: Erika Lie (1874-1895); Fernanda Nissen (1895-?)
- Relatives: Adam Egede-Nissen (nephew)

Elias Gottlieb Oscar Egede Nissen (31 October 1843 – 4 January 1911) was a Norwegian physician, newspaper editor and politician. He belonged to the Norwegian Labour Party from 1889 to his death, and was both party leader, party secretary as well as editor of the party organ Social-Demokraten for a period. He also made his mark as a campaigner for temperance and better health conditions. He was also chairman of the Norwegian Santal Mission.

== Personal life ==
Nissen was born in Tromsø as the son of physician Heinrich Nissen (1802–1866) and Fayette Ørbech (1806–1884). His father had migrated from Holstein to Norway in 1825, and his mother was born at Falster. Through his mother, Oscar Nissen was a descendant of missionary Hans Egede.

Nissen first married pianist Erika Lie. The marriage lasted from 1874 to 1895, and they had a daughter, Erika Nissen-Lie, born in 1878, and a son, Karl Nissen, born in 1879. Oscar Nissen married Fernanda Nissen in 1895. He was the uncle of politician Adam Egede-Nissen.

== Career ==
After spending some time at sea during his youth, he enrolled as a student of medicine in 1863. His study period was interrupted twice, as he volunteered in the 1864 Second Schleswig War and as a surgeon for six months in 1870 during the Franco-Prussian War. He finally graduated with the cand.med. degree in 1873, and specialized in gynecology.

Nissen was a devout Christian in his early life. From 1883 to 1887 he chaired the Norwegian Santal Mission. From 1884 to 1890 he edited the magazine Sundhedsbladet. Since 1876 Nissen was also a supporter of the temperance movement, and from 1884 to 1890 he edited the temperance magazine Menneskevennen. In the aftermath of the death of founder Asbjørn Kloster, he chaired the temperance organization Det norske Totalavholdsselskap from 1879 to 1887. This period witnessed a tenfold increase of membership. He retired from the organization as the 1887 national convention would not support his proposition on prohibition.

Nissen worked in Kristiania from 1884 as a specialist in women's diseases. He was not uncontroversial. At a meeting arranged by the Norwegian Students' Society on 17 November 1887, Nissen had made the claim that from his personal experience, only 10% of women had libido. He was lambasted by activist Ragna Nielsen, who tried, unsuccessfully, to channel her protest through the recently established (1884) Norwegian Association for Women's Rights.

Politically, Nissen originally belonged to the Liberal Party. However, towards the end of the 1880s he aligned more with the fledgling socialist movement. In 1889 he joined the Norwegian Labour Party, founded in 1887. In the same year he marked himself as a supporter of the strike among the match factory workers. It occurred in October 1889 when three hundred match factory workers, all female, laid down their work. They demanded a slight pay raise of 1 øre extra per gross packed as well as better sanitary conditions. Nissen was especially concerned about the danger of contracting phossy jaw, and famously spoke at a public meeting together with Bjørnstjerne Bjørnson. Nonetheless, the strike was given up in December.

He was the editor-in-chief of the party organ Social-Demokraten from 1894 to 1897, and served as the party secretary during the same period. He was also a member of Kristiania city council from 1898 to 1907. From 1906 to his death he was the chairman of the Labour Party. He died in Kristiania.

Party political offices
| Preceded by Olav Strøm | Party secretary of the Labour Party; 1894–1898 | Succeeded by Ludvig Meyer |
| Preceded by Christopher Hornsrud | Chairman of the Labour Party; 1906–1911 | Succeeded by Christian Holtermann Knudsen |
Media offices
| Preceded by Christian Holtermann Knudsen | Chief editor of Social-Demokraten; 1894–1898 | Succeeded by Ludvig Meyer |
