= Labour Party (Norway) =

Centre-left Norwegian political party

Labour Party Arbeiderpartiet Arbeidarpartiet
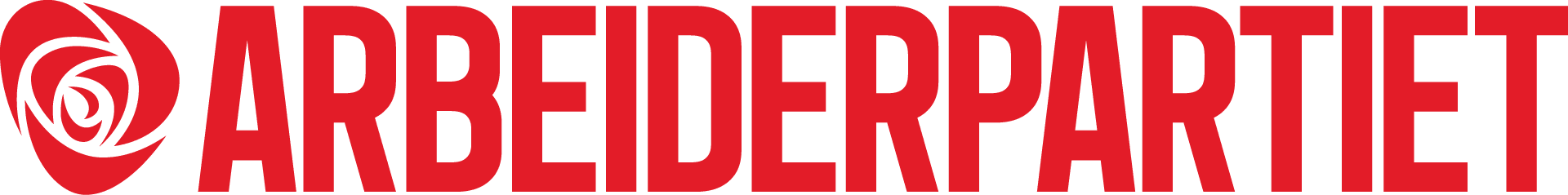
- Abbreviation: A Ap
- Leader: Jonas Gahr Støre
- Parliamentary leader: Tonje Brenna
- Founded: 22 August 1887; 139 years ago
- Headquarters: Youngstorget 2 A, 5th floor, Oslo
- Youth wing: Workers' Youth League
- Membership (2024): ▼43,952
- Ideology: Social democracy Pro-Europeanism
- Political position: Centre-left
- European affiliation: Party of European Socialists
- International affiliation: Progressive Alliance; Socialist International (1951–2016)
- Nordic affiliation: SAMAK; The Social Democratic Group
- Colours: Red
- Slogan: Trygghet for fremtida ('Safety for the future')
- Storting: 53 / 169
- County councils: 277 / 777
- Municipal councils: 2,023 / 10,620
- Sámi Parliament: 4 / 39

Website
- arbeiderpartiet.no

The Labour Party (Bokmål: Arbeiderpartiet; Nynorsk: Arbeidarpartiet, A or Ap; Northern Sami: Bargiidbellodat), formerly The Norwegian Labour Party (Norwegian: Det norske Arbeiderparti, DNA), is a social democratic political party in Norway. It is positioned on the centre-left of the political spectrum, and is led by Jonas Gahr Støre, the current Prime Minister of Norway.

The Labour Party is officially committed to social-democratic ideals. Its slogan is "safety for the future" (trygghet for framtida) and the party traditionally seeks a strong welfare state, funded through taxes and duties. Since the 1980s, the party has included more of the principles of a social market economy in its policy, allowing for privatisation of state-owned assets and services and reducing income tax progressivity, following the wave of economic liberalisation during the 1980s. During the first Stoltenberg government, the party's policies were inspired by Tony Blair's New Labour agenda in the United Kingdom and saw the most widespread privatisation by any government in Norway to that date. The party has frequently been described as increasingly neoliberal since the 1980s, both by political scientists and opponents on the political left. The Labour Party profiles itself as a progressive party that subscribes to co-operation on a national as well as international level.

Its youth wing is the Workers' Youth League. The party is a member of the Party of European Socialists and the Progressive Alliance. It was formerly a member of the Comintern (1919–1923), the International Revolutionary Marxist Centre (1932–1935), the Labour and Socialist International (1938–1940), and the Socialist International (1951–2016). The Labour Party has always been a strong supporter of Norwegian NATO membership and has supported Norway joining the European Union during two referendums. During the Cold War, when the party was in government most of the time, the party closely aligned Norway with the United States at the international level and followed an anti-communist policy at the domestic level in the aftermath of the 1948 Kråkerøy speech and culminating in Norway becoming a founding member of NATO in 1949.

Founded in 1887, the party steadily increased in support until it became the largest party in Norway at the 1927 parliamentary election, a position it has held ever since. That year also saw the consolidation of conflicts surrounding the party during the 1920s following its membership in the Comintern. It first formed a government in 1928 and has led the government for all but sixteen years since 1935. From 1945 to 1961, the party had an absolute majority in the Norwegian Parliament, to date the last time this has happened in the history of Norway. The electoral domination by the Labour Party during the 1960s and early 1970s was initially broken by competition from smaller left-wing parties, primarily from the Socialist People's Party. From the late 1970s, the party started to lose voters due to a rise in right-wing parties, leading to a swing to the right for the Labour Party under Gro Harlem Brundtland during the 1980s. In 2001, the party achieved its worst result since 1924. Between 2005 and 2013, Labour returned to power after committing to a coalition agreement with other parties in order to form a majority government. Labour entered opposition again after losing nine seats in 2013. The party lost a further six seats in 2017, yielding the second-lowest number of seats since 1924. Since the 2021 and 2025 elections, Labour has headed a minority government.

== History ==
=== Founding and early years ===
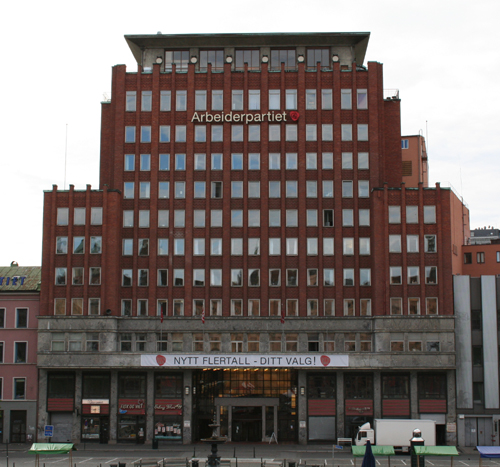
The party headquarters in Oslo

The party was founded in 1887 in Arendal and first ran in elections to the Storting in 1894. It entered the parliament in 1903 and steadily increased its vote until 1927, when it became the largest party in Norway. The party were members of Communist International (Comintern), a communist organisation, between 1918 and 1923.

From the establishment of Vort Arbeide in 1884, the party had a growing and notable organisation of newspapers and other press outlets. The party press system eventually resulted in Norsk Arbeiderpresse (Norwegian Labour Press). In January 1913, the party had 24 newspapers and six more newspapers were founded in 1913. The party also had the periodical Det 20de Aarhundre. In 1920, the party had 33 newspapers and 6 semi-affiliated newspapers. The party had its own publishing house, Det norske Arbeiderpartis forlag, succeeded by Tiden Norsk Forlag. In addition to books and pamphlets, Det norske Arbeiderpartis forlag published Maidagen (annual May Day publication), Arbeidets Jul (annual Christmas publication) and Arbeiderkalenderen (calendar). The party also published a monthly political magazine, Kontakt, between 1947 and 1954 which was edited by Torolf Elster.

From its roots as a radical alternative to the political establishment, the party grew to its current dominance through several eras. The party experienced a split in 1921 caused by a decision made two years earlier to join the Comintern and the Social Democratic Labour Party of Norway was formed. In 1923, the party left the Comintern while a significant minority of its members left the party to form the Communist Party of Norway. In 1927, the Social Democrats were reunited with Labour. Some Communists also joined Labour whereas other Communists tried a failed merger endeavor which culminated in the formation of the Arbeiderklassens Samlingsparti. The same year, Helga Karlsen became the party's first female Member of Parliament.

In 1928, Christopher Hornsrud formed Labour's first government, but it lasted only two weeks. During the early 1930s, Labour abandoned its revolutionary profile and set a reformist course. Labour then returned to government in 1935 and remained in power throughout the Second World War. The party was a member of the Labour and Socialist International between 1938 and 1940. When Norway was invaded by Nazi Germany in 1940, the Labour-led government and the Norwegian royal family fled to London, whence it led a government-in-exile for the duration of the war.

=== Post-war period ===
Immediately following the end of the Second World War, the Labour Party emerged victorious from the 1945 Norwegian parliamentary election. For the first time, the party secured an absolute majority in the Storting, taking 76 of 150 seats. Einar Gerhardsen of the Labour Party subsequently formed his first government, and he went on to dominate the post-war political scene over the following years. Gerhardsen is commonly referred to as Landsfaderen (Father of the Nation) and is generally considered one of the principal architects behind the reconstruction of Norway after the Second World War. The period from 1945 has been described as the golden age of the Norwegian Labour Party, and the party retained its parliamentary majority until the 1961 election. In 1963, the Kings Bay Affair drove the opposition to table a motion of no-confidence against the Gerhardsen's cabinet; the motion was ultimately successful, and Labour was forced to step down from government for the first time in 28 years. However, the incoming centre-right coalition proved short-lived, and Labour returned to government less than one month later, and remained in office until 1965.

The Labour Party later formed government in the periods of 1971–1972, 1973–1981, 1986–1989, and 1990–1997. Labour prime ministers in this period included party veterans Oscar Torp, Trygve Bratteli, and Gro Harlem Brundtland, and the party remained the largest in Norway throughout the remainder of the 20th century.

=== 21st century ===
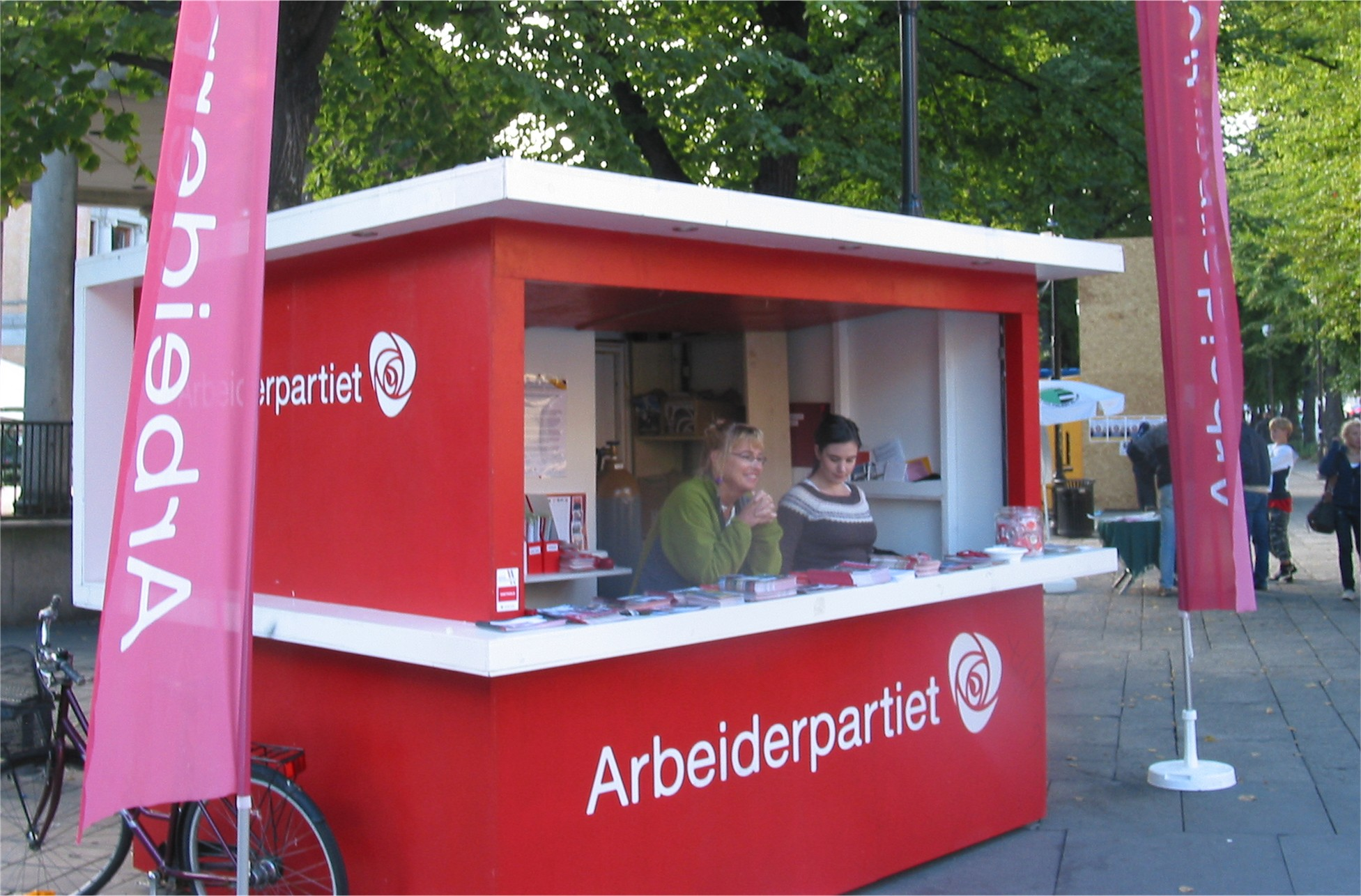
Campaign booth at Karl Johans gate ahead of the 2007 Norwegian local elections

In the year 2000, the centre-right coalition led by Kjell Magne Bondevik of the Christian Democrats was toppled in a confidence vote, and the Labour Party returned to power under Jens Stoltenberg, who became prime minister. However, after a period of intense infighting between Stoltenberg and former prime minister Thorbjørn Jagland, and a turbulent spell in government, the party collapsed to only 24.3% of the vote in the 2001 Norwegian parliamentary election, marking its worst result since 1924. The party returned to the opposition under Stoltenberg's leadership, before later recovering to 32.7% in the 2005 Norwegian parliamentary election. The Labour Party subsequently formed its first ever peace-time coalition government along with the Socialist Left and Centre parties. Their cooperation was dubbed the Red-green coalition, in emulation of similar constellations in Germany.

In 2011, the party changed its official name from the Norwegian Labour Party (Det norske arbeiderparti) to the Labour Party (Arbeiderpartiet). The party claimed there had been confusion among voters at polling stations because of the difference between the official name and the common use name of Labour Party. The name change caused Arbeiderpartiet to appear on the ballot, eliminating any potential confusion. On 22 July 2011, terrorist Anders Behring Breivik opened fire at the Labour Party's youth camp (ages 13–25), killing 69 people and killing eight more in Oslo with a bomb targeting a government building (which was led by the Labour Party). Stoltenberg's initial response to the 22 July attack was well received by the Norwegian public. As he reaffirmed his government's commitment to the values of openness and tolerance in the face of adversity or intolerance his approval rating soared as high as 94%, only to decrease sharply after the 22 July Commission report highlighted the laggard response time of police cost dozens of lives.

In the 2013 Norwegian parliamentary election, the Red-green coalition lost its majority in the Storting, but the Labour Party remained the largest party in the Storting. Jens Stoltenberg, who had served as prime minister for 10 of the past 13 years, remained party leader until he stepped down in 2014 after being appointed Secretary General of NATO. Later, Jonas Gahr Støre, a prominent profile in the Stoltenberg government, was chosen as new party leader on 14 June 2014. In the 2017 Norwegian parliamentary election, he led the party to a surprise defeat, as Labour fell 3.4 percentage points to 27.4%, and from 55 to 49 seats in the Storting, while the Conservative Party managed to retain a majority along with its smaller centre-right partners. Erna Solberg, Conservative prime minister since 2013, remained in office throughout the 2017–2021 term. In the same year, the Labour Party was targeted by hackers suspected to be from Russia.

In 2021, the Labour Party returned to government after eight years in opposition, following the 2021 parliamentary election. The party dropped to 48 seats from the 49 it had secured in 2017, but its centre-left coalition secured a landslide victory overall, taking 100 of the 169 seats in the Storting. The energy crisis was the most important issue for voters. Party leader Jonas Gahr Støre assumed the Norwegian premiership on 14 October 2021, at the helm of a minority coalition with the Centre Party. Soon after assuming power, the new coalition was faced with a series of crises, including the Russian invasion of Ukraine and subsequent energy price hikes. The government was criticized for its handling of these crises, and by August 2022, Støre had dropped to 31% in preferred prime minister polling, against 49% for Erna Solberg, the Conservative prime minister in the 2013—2021 period. Meanwhile, the Labour Party hit record-low ratings in voting intention polls in late 2022, with a number of polls placing it below the 20%-mark in September 2022. After the Centre Party withdrew from the cabinet, former Prime Minister Jens Stoltenberg returned as Finance Minister, a move credited with giving the Labour Party a significant boost in the polls. In the 2025 parliamentary election, Labour secured 28.0% of the vote and won 53 seats (an increase of five from their 2021 total), enabling the party to continue governing as a minority.

The Labour Party broadly supports LGBT+ rights and has promoted important reforms. The Labour Party's youth wing, AUF, as well as the party's LGBT+ network, were among the signatories of a 2025 call for an inclusive feminism.

== Organisation ==
The Labour Party organisation is divided into county- and municipality-level chapters, numbering approximately 2,500 associations in total. Historically, the party has maintained a close association with the Norwegian Confederation of Trade Unions (LO), and until the mid-1990s, a dual-membership agreement existed between the two organizations, with LO members automatically holding (indirect) membership in the Labour Party as well. The party had about 200,500 members at its peak in 1950. No records were kept about direct membership or indirect membership figures. The dual-membership clause was scrapped in 1995, and that year its membership level fell to just over 72,500 from 128,000 in 1990. In 1997, that figure dropped to 64,000 in 1997. In 2021, the party comprised 45,553 members according to its own official website. Since 2005, the party has maintained a policy requiring full gender parity at every level of organisation above ordinary membership.

The supreme body of the party is the Party Congress which is held every two years. The most senior body between these congresses is the National Delegate's Meeting which is made up of the party's executive board and two delegates from each of the 19 counties. The executive board itself consists of 16 elected members as well as the leadership of the party. The party is headed by a single leader, while the number of deputy leaders has fluctuated between one and two in different periods. As of 2022, the party leadership is made up of leader Jonas Gahr Støre, who has held the position since 2014, and deputy leader Bjørnar Selnes Skjæran, who was first elected to the position in 2021.

The party's youth organisation is the Workers' Youth League, and it maintains a women's wing known as the Labour Party Women's Network. The party participates in elections to the Sami Parliament of Norway, and work related to this has its own organisational structure with seven local groups, a bi-yearly congress, a national council and the Labour group in the Sami parliament.

== Prominent party members ==
=== Party leaders ===
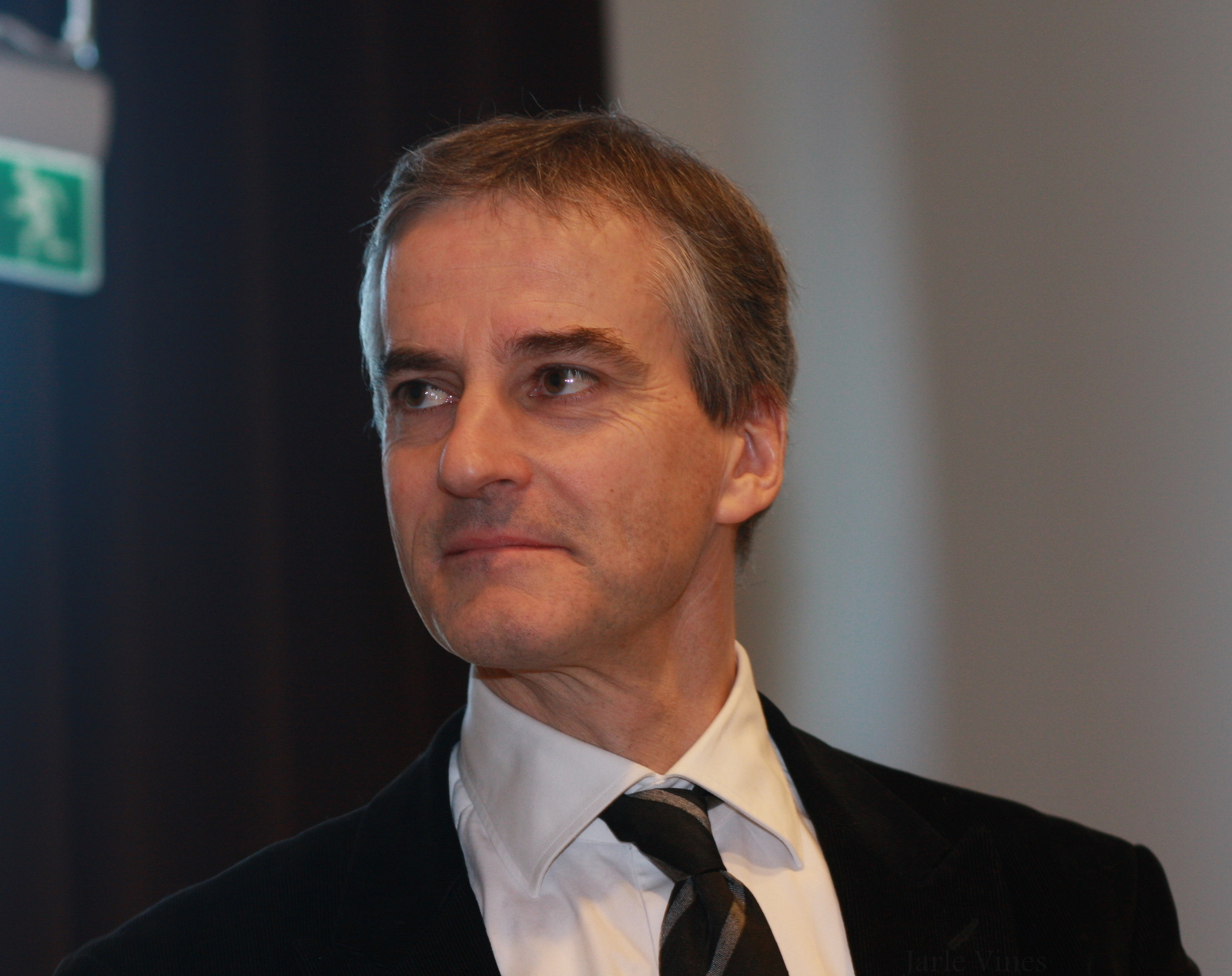
Jonas Gahr Støre, party leader since 2014 and prime minister since 2021.

1. Anders Andersen (1887–1888)
2. Hans G. Jensen (1888–1889)
3. Christian Holtermann Knudsen (1889–1890)
4. Carl Jeppesen (1890–1892)
5. Ole Georg Gjøsteen (1892–1893)
6. Gustav A. Olsen-Berg (1893–1894)
7. Carl Jeppesen (1894–1897)
8. Ludvig Meyer (1897–1900)
9. Christian Holtermann Knudsen (1900–1903)
10. Christopher Hornsrud (1903–1906)
11. Oscar Nissen (1906–1911)
12. Christian Holtermann Knudsen (1911–1918)
13. Kyrre Grepp (1918–1922)
14. Emil Stang (1922–1923)
15. Oscar Torp (1923–1945)
16. Einar Gerhardsen (1945–1965)
17. Trygve Bratteli (1965–1975)
18. Reiulf Steen (1975–1981)
19. Gro Harlem Brundtland (1981–1992)
20. Thorbjørn Jagland (1992–2002)
21. Jens Stoltenberg (2002–2014)
22. Jonas Gahr Støre (2014–present)

=== Labour Party prime ministers ===
1. Christopher Hornsrud (January–February 1928)
2. Johan Nygaardsvold (1935–1945) (Note: During the German occupation of Norway from 1940 to 1945, Johan Nygaardsvold was in exile in London.)
3. Einar Gerhardsen (1945–1951, 1955–1963, 1963–1965)
4. Oscar Torp (1951–1955)
5. Trygve Bratteli (1971–1972, 1973–1976)
6. Odvar Nordli (1976–1981)
7. Gro Harlem Brundtland (February–October 1981, 1986–1989, 1990–1996)
8. Thorbjørn Jagland (1996–1997)
9. Jens Stoltenberg (2000–2001, 2005–2013)
10. Jonas Gahr Støre (2021–present)

=== Party Congresses ===
- 1. landsmøte 1887 Arendal
- 2. landsmøte 1888 Kristiania
- 3. landsmøte 1889 Kristiania
- 4. landsmøte 1890 Kristiania
- 5. landsmøte 1891 Kristiania
- 6. landsmøte 1892 Kristiania
- 7. landsmøte 1893 Kristiania
- 8. landsmøte 1894 Bergen
- 9. landsmøte 1895 Skien
- 10. landsmøte 1896 Kristiania
- 11. landsmøte 1897 Kristiania
- 12. landsmøte 1898 Fredrikstad
- 13. landsmøte 1899 Kristiania
- 14. landsmøte 1900 Kristiania
- 15. landsmøte 1901 Kristiania
- 16. landsmøte 1902 Trondheim
- 17. landsmøte 1903 Kristiania
- 18. landsmøte 1904 Drammen
- 19. landsmøte 1906 Kristiania
- 20. landsmøte 1909 Hamar
- 1. ekstraordinære landsmøte 1911 13–16 April Kristiania
- 21. landsmøte 1912 4—9 April Stavanger
- 22. landsmøte 1915 22-26 may Trondhjem
- 23. landsmøte 1918 29 mars—1 April Oslo
- 2. ekstraordinære landsmøte 1919 7—10 juni Oslo
- 24. landsmøte 1920 22—25 may Oslo
- 25. landsmøte 1921 25—28 March 1921 Oslo
- 26. landsmøte 1923 24—28 February Oslo
- 3 ekstraordinære landsmøte 1923 2—4 November Oslo
- 27. landsmøte 1925 4—6 September Oslo
- 4. ekstraordinære landsmøte 1927 28—29 January Oslo
- Samlingskongressen. 30—31 January 1927 Oslo
- 28. landsmøte 1930 14—16 march Oslo
- 29. landsmøte 1933 26—28 may Oslo
- 30. landsmøte 1936 2-4 may Oslo
- 31. landsmøte 1939 3-5 November Oslo
- 32. landsmøte 1945 31-2 September Oslo
- 33. landsmøte 1949 17-20 February Oslo
- 34. landsmøte 1953 22-25 march Oslo
- 35. landsmøte 1955 19-21 march Oslo
- 36. landsmøte 1957 30, 31 may and 1 June Oslo
- 37. landsmøte 1959 7-9 may Oslo
- 38. landsmøte 1961 9-11 April Oslo
- 39. landsmøte 1963 23-25 may Oslo
- 40. landsmøte 1965 27-29 may Oslo
- 41. landsmøte 1967 21-23 may Oslo
- 42. landsmøte 1969 11-14 may Oslo
- 43. landsmøte 1971 9-11 may Oslo
- 5. ekstraordinær landsmøte 1972 21-22 April Oslo
- 44. landsmøte 1973 27-30 may Oslo
- 45. landsmøte 1975 20-23 may Oslo
- 46. landsmøte 1977 8-11 may Oslo
- 47. landsmøte 1979 6-9 may Oslo
- 48. landsmøte 1981 2-5 April Hamar
- 49. landsmøte 1983 22-24 April Oslo
- 50. landsmøte 1985 21-24 march Oslo
- 51. landsmøte 1987 26-29 march Oslo
- 52. landsmøte 1989 2-5 march SAS Scandinavian Hotell
- 53. landsmøte 1990 9-11 November Folkets Hus
- 54. landsmøte 1992 5-8 November Folkets Hus
- 6. ekstraordinære landsmøte 1994 18-18 June Folkets Hus
- 55. landsmøte 1995 10-12 februar Folkets Hus
- 56. landsmøte 1996 7-11 November Folkets Hus
- 57. landsmøte 1998 20-22 November Folkets Hus
- 58. landsmøte 2000 9-12 November Folkets Hus
- 59. landsmøte 2002 8-10 November Folkets Hus
- 60. landsmøte 2005 7-10 April Folkets Hus
- 61. landsmøte 2007 19-22 April Folkets Hus
- 62. landsmøte 2009 18-21 April Folkets Hus
- 63. landsmøte 2011 7-10 April Folkets Hus
- 64. landsmøte 2013 18-21 April Folkets Hus
- 7. ekstraordinære landsmøte 2014 14 June Folkets Hus
- 65. landsmøte 2015 16-19 April Folkets Hus
- 66. landsmøte 2017 20-23 April Folkets Hus
- 67. landsmøte 2019 4-7 April Folkets Hus
- 68. landsmøte 2021 15-17 April The Hub and Microsoft Teams.
- 69 landsmøte 2023 4-6 may Folkets Hus

== Election results ==
=== Storting ===
Election	Leader	Votes	%	Seats	+/–	Position	Status
1894	Carl Jeppesen	520	0.3	0 / 114	New	▲4th	No seats
1897	Ludvig Meyer	947	0.6	0 / 114	Steady	4th	No seats
1900	Christian Knudsen	7,013	3.0	0 / 114	Steady	4th	No seats
1903	Christopher Hornsrud	22,948	9.7	5 / 117	▲5	▼5th	Opposition
1906	Oscar Nissen	43,134	15.9	10 / 123	▲5	▲3rd	Opposition
1909	Oscar Nissen	91,268	21.5	11 / 123	▲1	▼4th	Opposition
1912	Christian Knudsen	128,455	26.2	23 / 123	▲12	▲2nd	Opposition
1915	Christian Knudsen	198,111	32.0	19 / 123	▼4	▼3rd	Opposition
1918	Kyrre Grepp	209,560	31.6	18 / 123	▼1	3rd	Opposition
1921	Kyrre Grepp	192,616	21.3	29 / 150	▲11	3rd	Opposition
1924	Oscar Torp	179,567	18.4	24 / 150	▼5	3rd	Opposition
1927	Oscar Torp	368,106	36.8	59 / 150	▲35	▲1st	Opposition (1927–1928)
1927	Oscar Torp	368,106	36.8	59 / 150	▲35	▲1st	Minority (1928)
1927	Oscar Torp	368,106	36.8	59 / 150	▲35	▲1st	Opposition (1928–1930)
1930	Oscar Torp	374,854	31.4	47 / 150	▼12	1st	Opposition
1933	Oscar Torp	500,526	40.1	69 / 150	▲22	1st	Opposition (1933–1935)
1933	Oscar Torp	500,526	40.1	69 / 150	▲22	1st	Minority (1935–1936)
1936	Oscar Torp	618,616	42.5	70 / 150	▲1	1st	Majority
1945	Einar Gerhardsen	609,348	41.0	76 / 150	▲6	1st	Coalition (1945)
1945	Einar Gerhardsen	609,348	41.0	76 / 150	▲6	1st	Majority (1945–1949)
1949	Einar Gerhardsen	803,471	45.7	85 / 150	▲9	1st	Majority
1953	Einar Gerhardsen	830,448	46.7	77 / 150	▼8	1st	Majority
1957	Einar Gerhardsen	865,675	48.3	78 / 150	▲1	1st	Majority
1961	Einar Gerhardsen	860,526	46.8	74 / 150	▼4	1st	Minority (1961–1963)
1961	Einar Gerhardsen	860,526	46.8	74 / 150	▼4	1st	Opposition (1963)
1961	Einar Gerhardsen	860,526	46.8	74 / 150	▼4	1st	Minority (1963–1965)
1965	Einar Gerhardsen	883,320	43.1	68 / 150	▼6	1st	Opposition
1969	Trygve Bratteli	1,004,348	46.5	74 / 150	▲6	1st	Opposition (1969–1971)
1969	Trygve Bratteli	1,004,348	46.5	74 / 150	▲6	1st	Minority (1971–1972)
1969	Trygve Bratteli	1,004,348	46.5	74 / 150	▲6	1st	Opposition (1972–1973)
1973	Trygve Bratteli	759,499	35.3	62 / 155	▼12	1st	Minority
1977	Reiulf Steen	972,434	42.3	76 / 155	▲14	1st	Minority
1981	Gro Harlem Brundtland	914,749	37.1	65 / 155	▼11	1st	Opposition
1985	Gro Harlem Brundtland	1,061,712	40.8	71 / 157	▲6	1st	Opposition (1985–1986)
1985	Gro Harlem Brundtland	1,061,712	40.8	71 / 157	▲6	1st	Minority (1986–1989)
1989	Gro Harlem Brundtland	907,393	34.3	63 / 165	▼8	1st	Opposition (1989–1990)
1989	Gro Harlem Brundtland	907,393	34.3	63 / 165	▼8	1st	Minority (1990–1993)
1993	Thorbjørn Jagland	908,724	36.9	67 / 165	▲4	1st	Minority
1997	Thorbjørn Jagland	904,362	35.0	65 / 165	▼2	1st	Opposition (1997–2000)
1997	Thorbjørn Jagland	904,362	35.0	65 / 165	▼2	1st	Minority (2000–2001)
2001	Thorbjørn Jagland	612,632	24.3	43 / 165	▼22	1st	Opposition
2005	Jens Stoltenberg	862,456	32.7	61 / 169	▲18	1st	Coalition
2009	Jens Stoltenberg	949,060	35.4	64 / 169	▲3	1st	Coalition
2013	Jens Stoltenberg	874,769	30.8	55 / 169	▼9	1st	Opposition
2017	Jonas Gahr Støre	801,073	27.4	49 / 169	▼6	1st	Opposition
2021	Jonas Gahr Støre	783,394	26.3	48 / 169	▼1	1st	Coalition (2021–2025)
2021	Jonas Gahr Støre	783,394	26.3	48 / 169	▼1	1st	Minority (2025)
2025	Jonas Gahr Støre	902,296	28.0	53 / 169	▲5	1st	Minority
