= Olaf Thommessen =

Norwegian politician

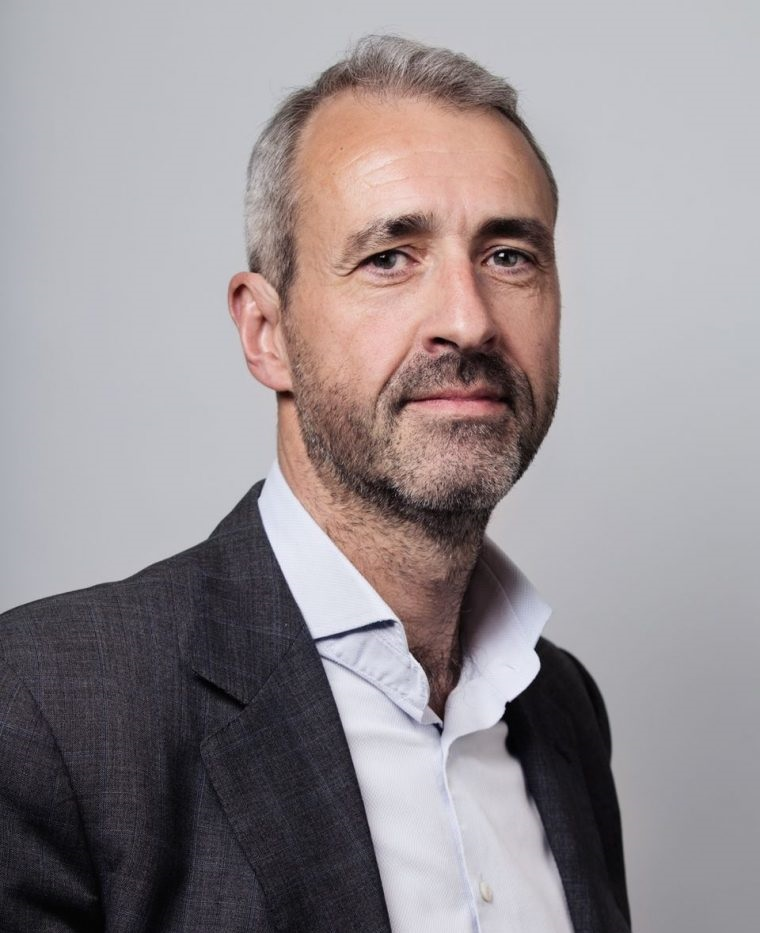
Thommessen in 2020

Olaf Henning Thommessen (born 1 August 1966) is a Norwegian businessperson and politician who was a deputy representative to the Parliament of Norway from Oslo from 2005 to 2009. He was the chief executive officer of SMB Norge, The Norwegian Association of Small & Medium Enterprises.

== Biography ==
Thommessen is a Roman Catholic of French and Norwegian descent. His mother, Annette Hilda Eliane Thommessen (née Arosa; 1932–1994), was a French national, and his father was Henrik Peter Thommessen, a son of Olaf D. Thommessen, grandson of Anne and Rolf Thommessen and great-grandson of Ola Thommessen. Annette and Henrik Thommessen were married from 1953 to 1978.

In 1996, Thommessen married to the Stockholm, Sweden-born model-actress Vendela, with whom he has two children. The couple separated in 2007, and Vendela and the children live in Nesodden.

In April 2019, he revealed that he had entered a relationship with entrepreneur Malin Sjoner. The couple had ended their relationship by November the same year.

== Career ==
Thommessen sat on the central board of the Liberal Party from 2002 to 2008. He was also second deputy leader of the party from 2004 to 2008. He withdrew in 2007. He served as a deputy representative to the Parliament of Norway from Oslo from 2005 to 2009, and was also a member of the Oslo city council.

In 2007 he released the autobiography På innsiden utenfor.

In June 2024, he announced that he would be seeking to return to parliament at the 2025 parliamentary election.
