= Olaf D. Thommessen =

Norwegian bookseller

Olaf Dobloug Thommessen (7 November 1906 – 1966) was a Norwegian bookseller.

== Personal life ==
He was the youngest son of Anne and Rolf Thommessen, and thus a paternal grandson of Ola Thommessen and maternal grandson of Mikkel Dobloug.

Together with Mimi Reimers (1906–1983) he had three sons, Rolf, (1930-2013), Henrik Peter Thommessen, (1931-2012) who married Annette Thommessen and Mikkel, (1945-) Mimi Reimers was a granddaughter of Herman Johan Foss Reimers and August Geelmuyden Spørck. Later he married Ellen Thykier, (1919-2016) and had a daughter, Trine, (1950-2011). Ellen Thykier was Danish and the daughter of the sculptor Niels Rasmussen Thykier and the physician Ellen Marie Kruse, Through his sister Susanna, Olaf D. Thommessen was a brother-in-law of Harald Hals.

== Career ==
From 1928 to 1938 he worked in his grandfather's and father's newspaper Tidens Tegn as journalist, subeditor and manager. In 1938 the family sold the newspaper. In 1940 he started the book shop A/S Bokhjørnet. He chaired the Oslo Booksellers Association from 1954, and then from 1956 to his death he chaired the Norwegian Booksellers Association.
