= Anne Thommessen =

Norwegian politician

Anne Thommessen, née Dobloug (4 February 1880 – 20 November 1968) was a Norwegian politician.

== Personal life and education ==
She was born in Kristiania as a daughter of Mikkel Dobloug (1844–1913) and his wife Susanna, née Baashuus (1851–1931). She finished her secondary education with a private exam at Gjertsen's School in 1897. She later studied philology, but the studies were interrupted because of marriage.

In October 1900 in Kristiania she married Rolf Thommessen. The couple eventually moved to Bærum, first to Ringstabekk. From 1908 they lived in Evje. At Evje farm they had one horse, two cattle, two pigs and 27 chicken. Anne Thommessen's marriage with Rolf Thommessen was dissolved in 1938.

Through this marriage Anne was a daughter-in-law of Ola Thommessen, one of Norway's most important newspaper editors. Anne and Rolf had one adopted daughter and six children of their own; born between 1901 and 1913. The youngest son, Olaf, was the father-in-law of Annette Thommessen. Their second youngest daughter Susanna was married to Harald Hals from 1932 to 1945.

== Career ==
Anne Thommessen received political positions already in the 1910s, while it was still uncommon for women to hold such positions. She was a member of Bærum school board from 1917 to 1926, and a member of Bærum municipal council from 1919 to 1925. After a hiatus she stood for election again in 1931, and became a deputy council member for the following term.

In 1933 she joined Arbeidsfylkingen, serving as a member of a women's fundraising committee. Arbeidsfylkingen was an organization to combat unemployment, founded in 1932 by Walter Fyrst, who in 1933 became a prominent member of Nasjonal Samling.
