= Gudbrand Helenus Hartmann =

- Born: 17 June 1832
- Died: 30 April 1900 (aged 67)
- Occupations: Schoolteacher and rector
- Children: Edle Hartmann; Egil Hartmann
- Relatives: Frederik Beichmann (son-in-law); Annæus Johannes Schjødt (son-in-law)

Gudbrand Helenus Hartmann (17 June 1832 – 30 April 1900) was a Norwegian schoolteacher, rector and civil servant.

He was born in Christiania to Paul Bøckmann Hartmann and Henrikka Severine Anker, and was the father of Edle Hartmann and Egil Hartmann.

Hartmann worked as schoolteacher in Larvik from 1857 to 1875. From 1875 he was rector at a secondary school in Tromsø, and from 1886 in Skien. He was also a municipal servant in Tromsø and Skien. He was decorated Knight of the Order of St. Olav in 1889.
