= Mikkel Dobloug (politician) =

Norwegian merchant, wholesaler, philanthropist, and politician

- Born: 23 December 1844; Vang, Norway
- Died: 18 October 1913 (aged 68)
- Occupations: Merchant, wholesaler, philanthropist, and politician

Mikkel Dobloug (23 December 1844 – 18 October 1913) was a Norwegian merchant, wholesaler, philanthropist, and politician.

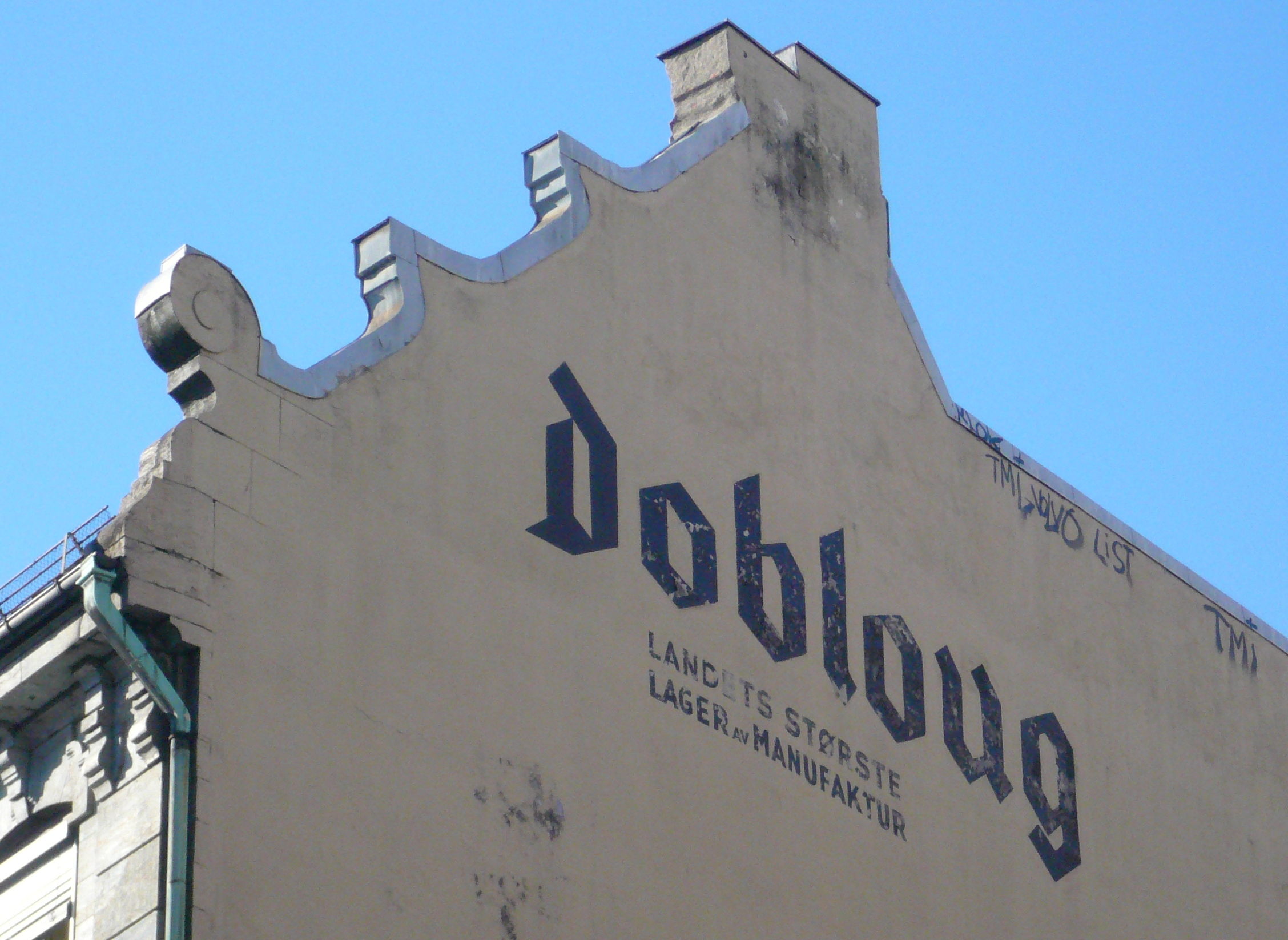
Wall advertisement on Dobloug (1901)

== Biography ==
Mikkel Mikkelsen Dobloug was born in Vang Municipality in Hedmark county, Norway. He was the son of farmer Mikkel Dobloug (1799–1844) and Anne Ry (1806-1879). He was the youngest of eight siblings and born after his father's death. In 1870, he founded the company Brødrene Dobloug in Christiania, along with his brother Jens Dobloug (1837-1891). After a few years, Jens left the business due to personal illness. The mercantile trade grew rapidly and became a nationwide enterprise. Alongside the retail sector, Dobloug was also established as a wholesaler.

He was a local politician for the Liberal Party. He was among the founders of the Free-minded Liberal Party (Frisinnede Venstre) in 1909. Together with newspaper editor Ola Thommessen, he contributed to the foundation of the newspaper Tidens Tegn. The neighborhood of Doblougløkken and the street Mikkel Doblougs gate in the Oslo district of St. Hanshaugen were both named in his honor.

== Personal life ==
He was married in 1878 to Susanna Nilsdatter Baashuus (1851-1931), daughter of farmer Nils Baashus (b. 1814) and Berthe Marie Roseth (b. 1816). They were the parents of five children. In 1912, they established the charitable foundation Svanhild og Sigrun Doblougs legat for oppdragelse af pigebørn in memory of two of his daughters. Their daughter, Anne Thommessen (1880-1968) was married to newspaper editor Rolf Thommessen. Their son Birger Dobloug (1881-1944) was a businessman and philanthropist for whom the Dobloug Prize (Doblougprisen) was named. Their son Ingar Dobloug (1888-1976) took over the Brødrene Dobloug firm after the death of his father. Dobloug closed its doors in 1986 after 116 years of operation.
