= Thorstein Guthe =

Norwegian physician and fencer

Personal information
- Born: 25 April 1912 Oslo, Norway
- Died: 24 June 1994 (aged 82) Oslo, Norway

Sport
- Sport: Fencing

Thorstein Guthe (25 April 1912 – 24 June 1994) was a Norwegian physician and fencer.

== Personal life and early career ==
He was born in Kristiania as a son of tailor Hans O. Guthe (1869–1929) and Hilda Kathrine Helgesen (1876–1950). In 1939, he married Laura Friele Joys, a daughter of Einar Joys. In 1950 he married Karen Hedevig Schjødt, a daughter of Annæus Schjødt, granddaughter of Annæus J. Schjødt and sister of Annæus Schjødt, Jr.

He competed in the team foil and individual épée events at the 1936 Summer Olympics.

He finished his secondary education in 1930. After studies in bacteriology in London from 1933 to 1934 and Paris from 1934 to 1935, he took the cand.med. degree at the University of Oslo in 1939. He then studied internal medicine at the University of Minnesota from 1939 to 1940. During the Second World War he was the head physician in Little Norway from 1940 to 1941, then at the Health Office for Seamen in New York City from 1941 to 1943. He then worked at the Norwegian embassy in the United States for one year, then the Ministry of Social Affairs-in-exile from 1944 to 1945. After the war he studied at the Johns Hopkins University, Baltimore from 1946 to 1947.

== Later career ==
He was a consultant for the United Nations from 1947, and was a physician for the World Health Organization in Geneva from 1948 to 1956. In 1956 he was promoted to chief physician in the department of treponematosis. He also worked with combatting the disease yaws. In 1963 he was acting director of infectious diseases in the World Health Organization. In 1971 he was hired in the private sector as corporate chief physician of Elkem.

He was decorated as a Knight of the Order of St. Olav. He died in June 1994 in Oslo.
