= Johan Beichmann =

Norwegian military officer, journalist and businessman

- Born: Johan Didrik Schlömer Beichmann; 30 May 1886; Kristiania, Norway
- Died: 10 February 1966 (aged 79); Oslo
- Occupations: military officer, journalist and businessman
- Parent(s): Frederik Beichmann; Edle Hartmann
- Awards: Norwegian: War Medal; Defence Medal 1940–1945; Haakon VII 70th Anniversary Medal; Danish: Order of the Dannebrog; British: Knight Commander of the Order of the British Empire

Johan Didrik Schlömer Beichmann KBE (30 May 1886 – 10 February 1966) was a Norwegian military officer, journalist and businessman. A resistance pioneer during the German occupation of Norway, he fled to London and eventually served as head commander of the Norwegian Army-in-exile.

== Personal life ==
Beichmann was born in Kristiania, the son of judge and civil servant Frederik Beichmann, and writer Edle Hartmann. He was married three times, first to Eva Jacobsen, second to Mona Smith, and third time to Anne Sophie Amalie Troughton.

== Career ==
Beichmann graduated as military officer from the Norwegian Military Academy in 1907. He studied electrical engineering at the Technische Universität Darmstadt (1908–1908), and graduated from the Norwegian Military College in 1911.

He worked as journalist for the newspaper Tidens Tegn from 1911 to 1912. From 1912 to 1917 he headed Infantry Regiment 16, and was also periodically assigned as topographer for the Norwegian Mapping and Cadastre Authority. From 1918 to 1923 he was again journalist for Tidens Tegn, and eventually manager for the newspaper from 1923 to 1933.

He was promoted major in 1933, and in 1934 to lieutenant colonel and commander of the Alta Battalion.

Beichmann was a resistance pioneer during the German occupation of Norway. In 1941 he was in command of local so-called "fighting groups", which eventually developed to become part of the resistance organization Milorg. He had to flee from Norway in the autumn of 1941, and eventually reached London. From 1942 to 1945 he served as head of the Norwegian Hærens overkommando in London, with the rank of major general.

His war decorations include the Norwegian War Medal, Defence Medal 1940–1945, and Haakon VII 70th Anniversary Medal, and he was decorated Knight Commander of the Order of the British Empire.

He died in Oslo on 10 February 1966.
