= Korsaren =

Norwegian satirical magazine

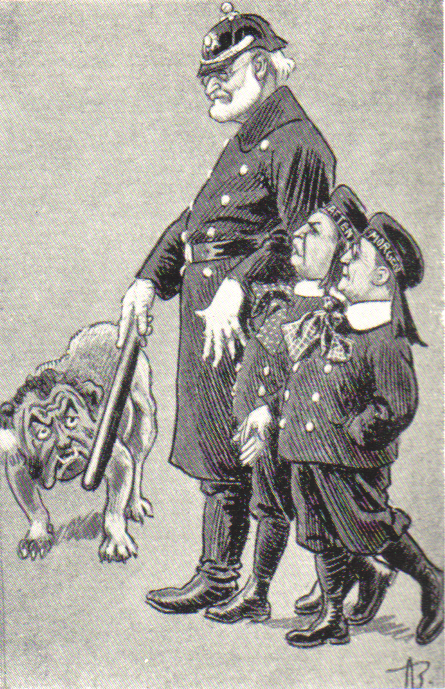
Caricature by Andreas Bloch from Korsaren 1905. President of the Storting Carl Berner protects the editors Amandus Schibsted (Aftenposten) and Nils Vogt (Morgenbladet) against Ola Thommessen (Verdens Gang).

Korsaren ('The Corsair') was a Norwegian satirical magazine published between 1879 and 1926.

== History and profile ==
Korsaren was established in 1879 by Jacob Breda Bull under the name Krydseren, mimicking an older publication of the same name. Until 1883, the magazine was published anonymously, from then on Schmidt was the editor. He ran the magazine until 1892. Bull sold the magazine in 1894, and it was relaunched as Korsaren. It was published in Kristiania, its editor-in-chief from 1894 to 1903 was Egil Hartmann, and its staff of caricaturists included Andreas Bloch and Gustav Lærum. In 1907, Korsaren got a sharper political profile with the Norwegian writer Hans Jæger and the Danish anarchist Jean Jacques Ipsen as editors. The corsair was to work against social democratic alliance politics and state parliamentarism. This organ came in ten issues, and was followed by Revolten, which came in eight issues.

Korsaren went defunct in 1926.
