= Gustav Lærum =

Norwegian sculptor

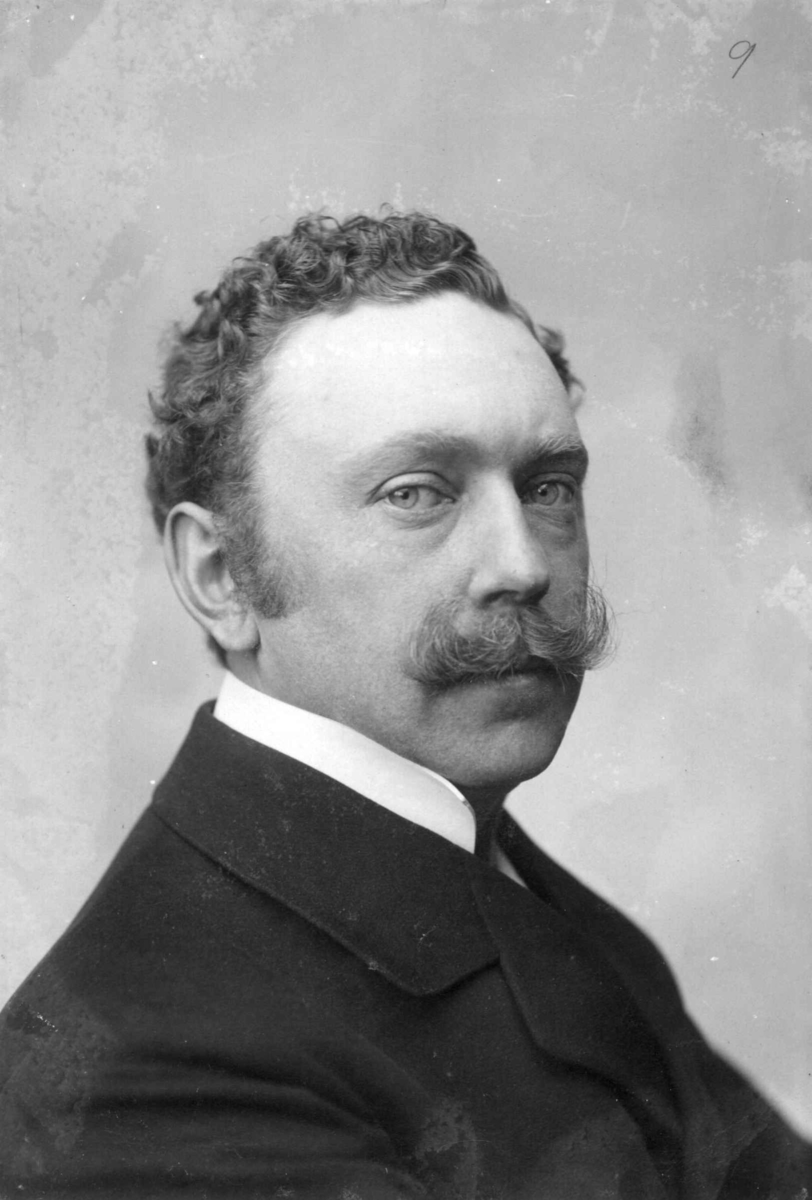
- Gustav Lærum in 1928
- Born: 2 June 1870; Fet, Norway
- Died: 21 May 1938 (aged 67); Oslo, Norway
- Occupations: Illustrator; Sculptor

Gustav Lærum (2 June 1870, in Fet – 21 May 1938) was a Norwegian satirical illustrator, caricaturist and sculptor.

He provided illustrations for the satirical magazines Korsaren, Tyrihans, and Vikingen, and also the newspaper Verdens Gang. Selected illustrations were published in Fra Uret til Grand, Norske Politici (1895), and Skyggebilder (1912). His sculptures include statues or busts of Prime Ministers Johan Sverdrup, Jørgen Løvland, and Gunnar Knudsen.
