= Øystein Thommessen =

Norwegian lawyer (1890–1986)

Øystein Thommessen (31 October 1890 – 1986) was a Norwegian lawyer.

He was born in Kristiania as a son of Jakob Peter Thommessen and Maja Johannessen. He was a nephew of Ola Thommessen and a first cousin of Rolf Thommessen. In April 1924 in Kristiania he married Ebba Lindeman.

He took his examen artium at Aars og Voss skole in 1908, and then graduated from the Royal Frederick University with the cand.jur. degree in 1912. He was a deputy judge in Aker from 1913 to 1916 and a junior solicitor from 1916, until taking the lawyer's credentials in 1919. From 1922 he worked as a law firm partner. His specialties were patent law, trademark law and tax law, and he wrote a seminal article on tax law in Norsk Retstidende in 1934, and a commentary on trademark law in 1961.

Between 1940 and 1945 he was a member of the Norwegian resistance movement. He was a member of the leading inner circle Kretsen from 1943, later Hjemmefrontens Ledelse. In cooperation with Tor Skjønsberg he had regular contact with the Norwegian legation in Stockholm, securing several monetary loans through contacts with the government-in-exile representatives stationed in Stockholm. He worked there himself from 1944, after he had to flee Norway. He was later a Norwegian delegate to the United Nations Conference on International Organization in 1945 and the Paris Peace Conference of 1946.

He was chairman of the Norwegian Museum of Cultural History from 1948 to 1966, and a board member of Gyldendal Norsk Forlag from 1941 to 1965, Elektrokemisk from 1952 to 1965 and Orkla Grube-Aktiebolag from 1956 to 1957. He was also a vice chancellor of the Order Council. He died in 1986.
