= Edle Hartmann =

- Born: 11 March 1862
- Died: 29 June 1946 (aged 84)
- Occupation: Writer
- Spouse(s): Frederik Beichmann (first husband); Annæus Johannes Schjødt (second husband)
- Children: Johan Beichmann
- Parent: Gudbrand Helenus Hartmann
- Relatives: Egil Hartmann (brother)

Edle Hartmann (11 March 1862 – 29 June 1946) was a Norwegian writer.

She was born in Larvik to Gudbrand Helenus Hartmann and Fredrikke Dorothea Christiane Michelet, and was a sister of jurist and publicist Egil Olaf Hartmann. She was married to jurist and civil servant Frederik Beichmann from 1885 to 1889. Among their children was Major General Johan Didrik Schlömer Beichmann. In 1900 she married barrister and politician Annæus Johannes Schjødt.

She wrote feuilletons for the newspapers Verdens Gang and Aftenposten, using the pseudonym "Sfinx". Two collections with her newspaper articles were published as Vi og voreses (1899) and Hjemme og gadelangs (1900). She further published the collection Fif og halvfif in 1902, illustrated by Olaf Gulbransson. In 1903 she published Blandet selskab, also illustrated by Gulbransson.
