= Nils Kjær =

Norwegian essayist and playwright (1870–1924)

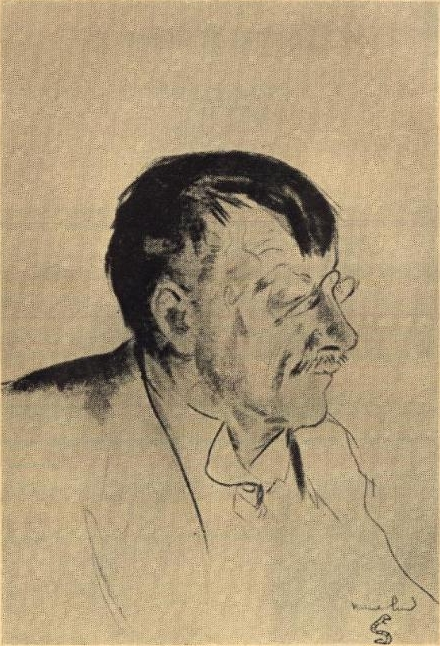
- Nils Kjær portrayed by Henrik Lund
- Born: 11 September 1870; Holmestrand, Norway
- Died: 9 February 1924 (aged 53)
- Occupations: Playwright; Short story writer Essayist; Literary critic Theatre critic.

Nils Kjær (11 September 1870 – 9 February 1924) was a Norwegian playwright, short story writer, essayist, literary critic and theatre critic.

== Personal life ==
Kjær was born in Holmestrand as the son of Nils Henrik Kjær and Christine Smestad. He married translator and teacher Fredrikke Margrete ("Maggen") Dons in 1896.

== Career ==
Kjær took his examen artium in 1890, and studied at the University of Oslo from 1890 to 1892. His first book was Essays; fremmede forfattere from 1895, a collection of articles published in Dagbladet and Kringsjaa. He made his début as a playwright with the tragedy Regnskabets dag from 1902. His satirical comedy Det lykkelige valg from 1913 was successfully performed on several Scandinavian stages. The performance at the National Theatre in Oslo (premièred on 29 January 1914) was produced by Gustav Thomassen, and saw Johanne Dybwad playing the character "Lavinia" and David Knudsen as the politician "Celius". His other plays were Mimosas hjemkomst from 1907, For træet er der haab from 1917, and Ønskekvisten. He issued an edition of Ludvig Holberg's comedies in 1898. His book Det evige Savn from 1907 contained two short stories.

Kjær wrote travel letters and participated in public debates, as well as reviewing literature and theatre. He delivered articles to the newspapers Morgenbladet and Verdens Gang, he was a theatre critic for Aftenposten from 1909 to 1921, and wrote for Tidens Tegn from 1922.

In an obituary in the periodical Samtiden 1924, Sigurd Hoel characterized Kjær as being more critical and analytical than creative, and having more talent for ridicule than for enthusiasm.
