= Ola Thommessen =

Norwegian newspaper editor

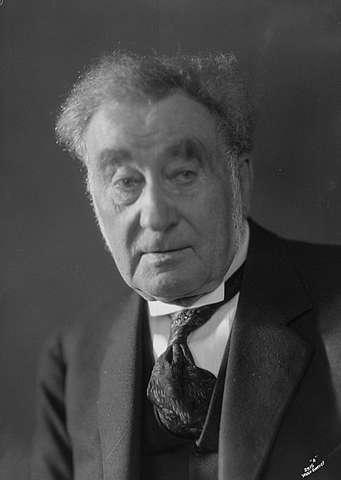
- Thommessen in 1928
- Born: 23 September 1851; Borre, Norway
- Died: 10 February 1942 (aged 90); Oslo, Norway
- Occupation: Newspaper editor
- Known for: Chief editor of Verdens Gang (1878–1910); Founder and editor of Tidens Tegn (1910–1917)
- Children: Rolf Thommessen
- Relatives: Olaf D. Thommessen (grandson); Anne Thommessen (daughter-in-law)

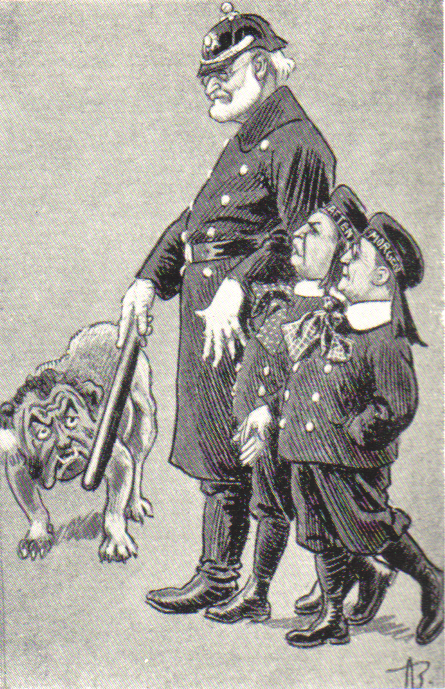
A caricature from 1905 (Andreas Bloch, Korsaren). Thommessen is depicted as an angry dog, and the conservative editors Amandus Schibsted (Aftenposten) and Nils Vogt (Morgenbladet) are shielded by politician Carl Berner.

Ola Thommessen (23 September 1851 – 10 February 1942) was a Norwegian newspaper editor. He was the long-time editor of Verdens Gang and Tidens Tegn.

== Early and personal life ==
Olaus Anthon Thommessen Holtan was born in Borre as the son of Thommes Kristoffersen Holtan (1817–1901) and Hella Marie Andersdatter (1824–1893). He was married twice, and was the father of newspaper editor Rolf Thommessen.

Thommessen studied at Heltberg's "student factory", and took the examen artium in 1870. He started studying philology, but abandoned the education to study law, finishing his cand.jur. degree in 1877.

== Professional career ==
Thommessen started working for Dagbladet in 1875. He worked for Verdens Gang from 1876, and as editor-in-chief from 1878 to 1910. Under his leadership Verdens Gang became the main publication for the Liberal Party, and a modern newspaper of high standard. The leadership period included the period of political turmoil in the 1880s. The newspaper supported the Liberal Party and Johan Sverdrup, and their endeavors to form a cabinet. Thommessen frequently corresponded with the writer Bjørnstjerne Bjørnson at this time, and was also a friend of Lars Holst, Oda Krohg, Mathilde Schjøtt as well as Maren, Ossian and Ernst Sars. Thommessen was a controversial person, and he is targeted in Knut Hamsun's novel Redaktør Lynge (1893), which is regarded as a personal attack on Thommessen, one of the strongest in the history of Norwegian literature. The novel still received good reviews in Verdens Gang.

Not long after the Liberal Party succeeded, and Johan Sverdrup became Prime Minister, Thommessen became estranged from the party. Around the turn of the century he instead advocated a bourgeois coalition in light of the growing socialist movement. Still, many of his political views aligned with those of the Liberal Party, such as universal suffrage for men which was introduced in 1898.

Thommessen left Verdens Gang in 1910, and founded the newspaper Tidens Tegn, which he led until 1917. The incidents leading to his resignation, a conflict with lawyer and share owner Ole Madsen, made him a legend. Among the outcomes was the formation of Norwegian Press Association in 1910. Tidens Tegn soon became one of the country's most important and largest newspapers, and many important cultural personalities were among the contributors, including Sven Elvestad, Olaf Bull, Hans E. Kinck, Herman Wildenvey, Nils Collett Vogt and Selma Lagerlöf. In 1920 his sons took over as editors of Tidens Tegn. The newspaper bought Verdens Gang in 1923.

He was a member of the Norwegian Association for Women's Rights.

In the interwar period Thommessen was known for his anti-communism. He was skeptic to the Norwegian Parliament, and advocated a strong bourgeois leadership as a leading member of Fedrelandslaget. Thommessen also wrote several books.

He died in 1942, 91 years old, surviving both his sons.
