= Annæus Schjødt Jr. =

Norwegian barrister (1920–2014)

Annæus Schjødt (13 February 1920 – 4 November 2014) was a Norwegian barrister.

== Personal life ==
He was born in Aker as a son of Annæus Schjødt (1888–1972) and Hedevig Schjødt, née Petersen (1892–1966). He was a grandson of Attorney General Annæus J. Schjødt. His sister Karen Hedevig Schjødt married chief physician Thorstein Guthe. From 1947 to 1965 he was married to Sissel Anker Olsen (1927–1987), a daughter of Kristofer Anker Olsen and sister of Sossen Krohg. From 1968 to 1976 he was married to Grethe Buck, a daughter of Bertel Otto Steen and Bodil Braathen. After their divorce in 1976, he married Mossad agent Sylvia Rafael (1937–2005) whom he had defended in 1974 for her participation in the Lillehammer affair. He died aged 94 on 4 November 2014.

== Career ==
He took the examen artium at Riis in 1938 and the cand.jur. degree in 1947. In between he served four years in the air force during the Second World War, in the UK and Canada. He served for two years in No. 331 Squadron RAF. He was decorated with the War Medal, the Defence Medal 1940–1945 and the Haakon VII 70th Anniversary Medal.

He worked as a deputy judge in 1948. He became a junior solicitor in his father's law firm in 1949 and became partner in 1951. From 1953 he was a barrister with access to work with Supreme Court cases. He is especially known for working with the Lillehammer case in 1974, where he defended his future wife Sylvia Rafael. He is also known from several libel cases. He was also chairman of Hjemmet, Knaben Molybdængruber and Braathens SAFE, and a board member of the Norwegian Bar Association, Wittusen & Jensen, Elektrokontakt, Schibstedgruppen, Bertel O. Steen, Ingeniør F. Selmer, Tostrupgaarden, Hotel Bristol, A. Johnson & Co., Avon Rubber, Rank Xerox, Forsikringsselskapet Minerva and Forsikringsselskapet Viking. He retired in 1992, and moved to Pretoria, South Africa with his wife. She died in 2005, and Schjødt moved back to Norway in 2006.
