= Egil Hartmann =

Norwegian journalist (1859–1906)

Egil Olaf Hartmann
- Born: 1 April 1859
- Died: 3 November 1906 (aged 47)
- Occupations: Jurist, journalist, magazine editor and archivist
- Known for: Editor of the satirical magazine Korsaren
- Parent: Gudbrand Helenus Hartmann
- Relatives: Edle Hartmann (sister)

Egil Olaf Hartmann (1 April 1859 – 3 November 1906) was a Norwegian jurist, archivist, journalist and magazine editor.

He was born in Larvik in Vestfold. He was the son of Gudbrand Helenus Hartmann and Fredrikke Dorothea Christiane. The family lived briefly in the 1870s at Tromsø, and then moved to Skien. He earned his cand.jur. in 1887. He was appointed to the National Archival Services of Norway in 1894 and promoted to the position of archivist in 1898. He was a journalist for the newspaper Morgenbladet from 1890 to 1904, and edited the satirical magazine Korsaren from 1894 to 1903. The article collection Blink; fra dagliglivets psykologi was published posthumously in 1908.
