= Olaf Krohn =

Norwegian satirical illustrator and painter (1863–1933)

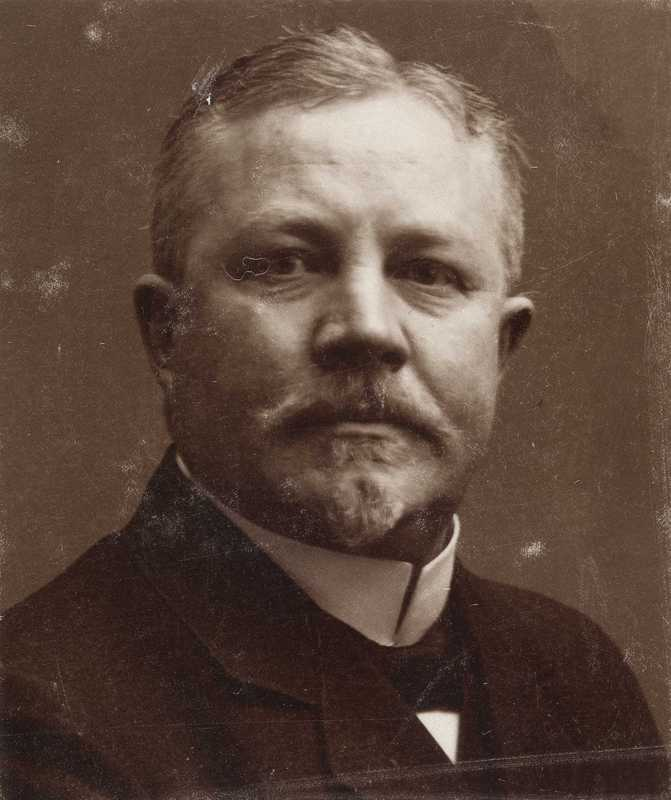
- Born: 4 June 1863
- Died: 18 June 1933 (aged 70)
- Occupation: Satirical illustrator

Olaf Krohn (4 June 1863 – 18 June 1933) was a Norwegian satirical illustrator, educated as painter.

He is particularly known for his illustrations in the satirical magazine Vikingen. He published the series Theaterkatten from 1897 to 1929. Among his other publications are Joujou; aarsrevue med vers from 1886, and Oslo-short-stories from 1929. He is represented in the National Gallery.

== Gallery ==
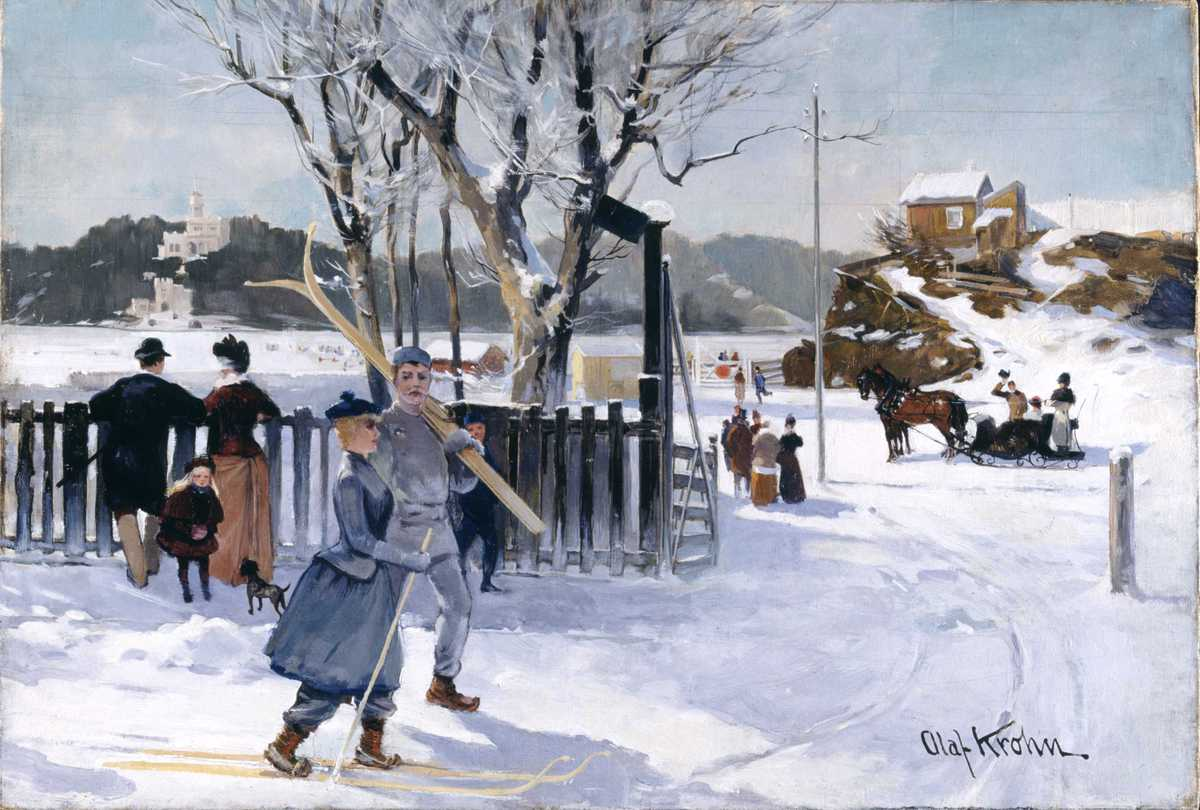
Folk life motif from Skarpsno in Oslo, oil on canvas, 41.3 x 60.4 cm
Original: Oslo Museum

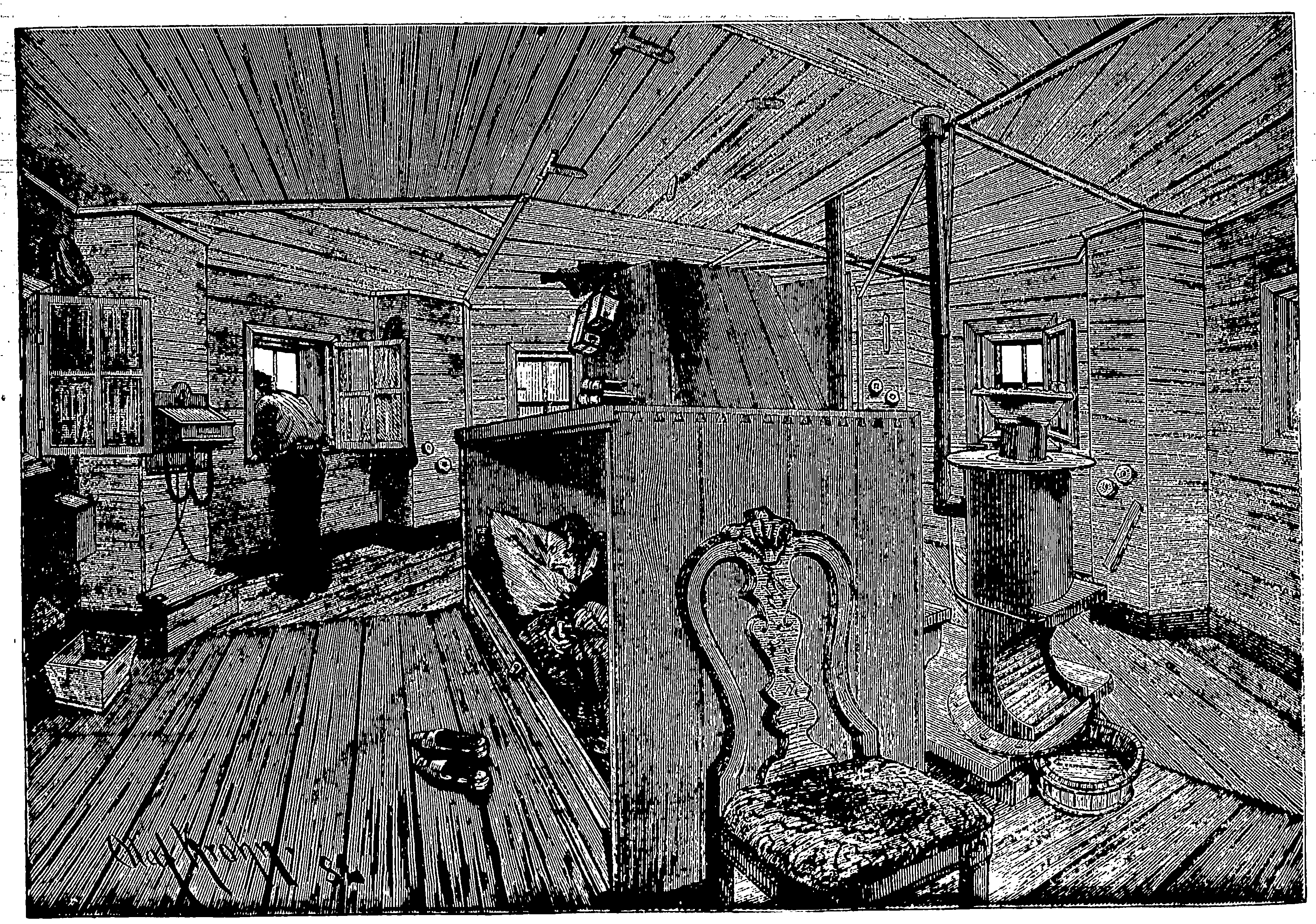
At the Tower Watcher. Illustration for a report about the tower at Our Savior's Church in Kristiania.

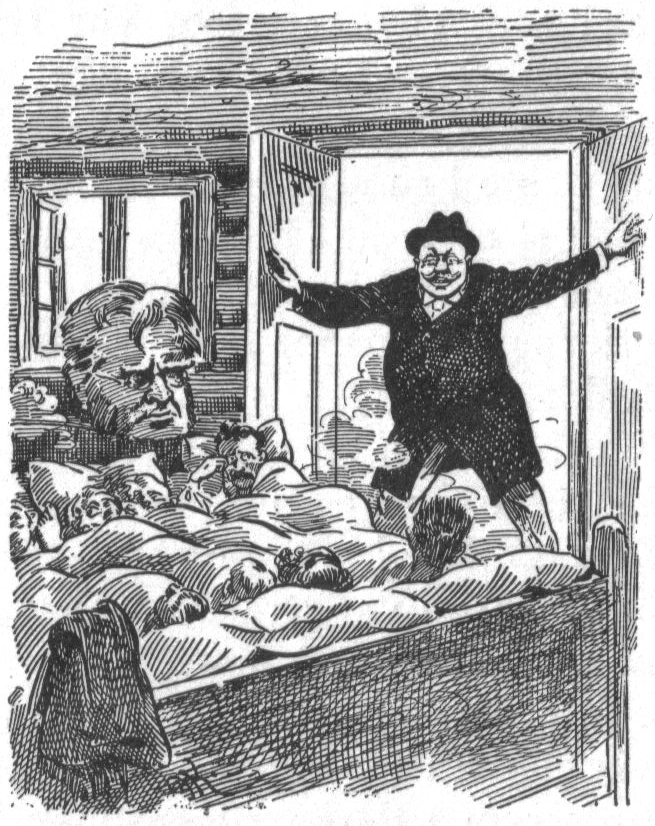
The big spring bed at Aulestad". Gunnar Heiberg in the door, Bjørnstjerne Bjørnson's head by the window.
