= August Schneider =

Norwegian artist (1842–1873)

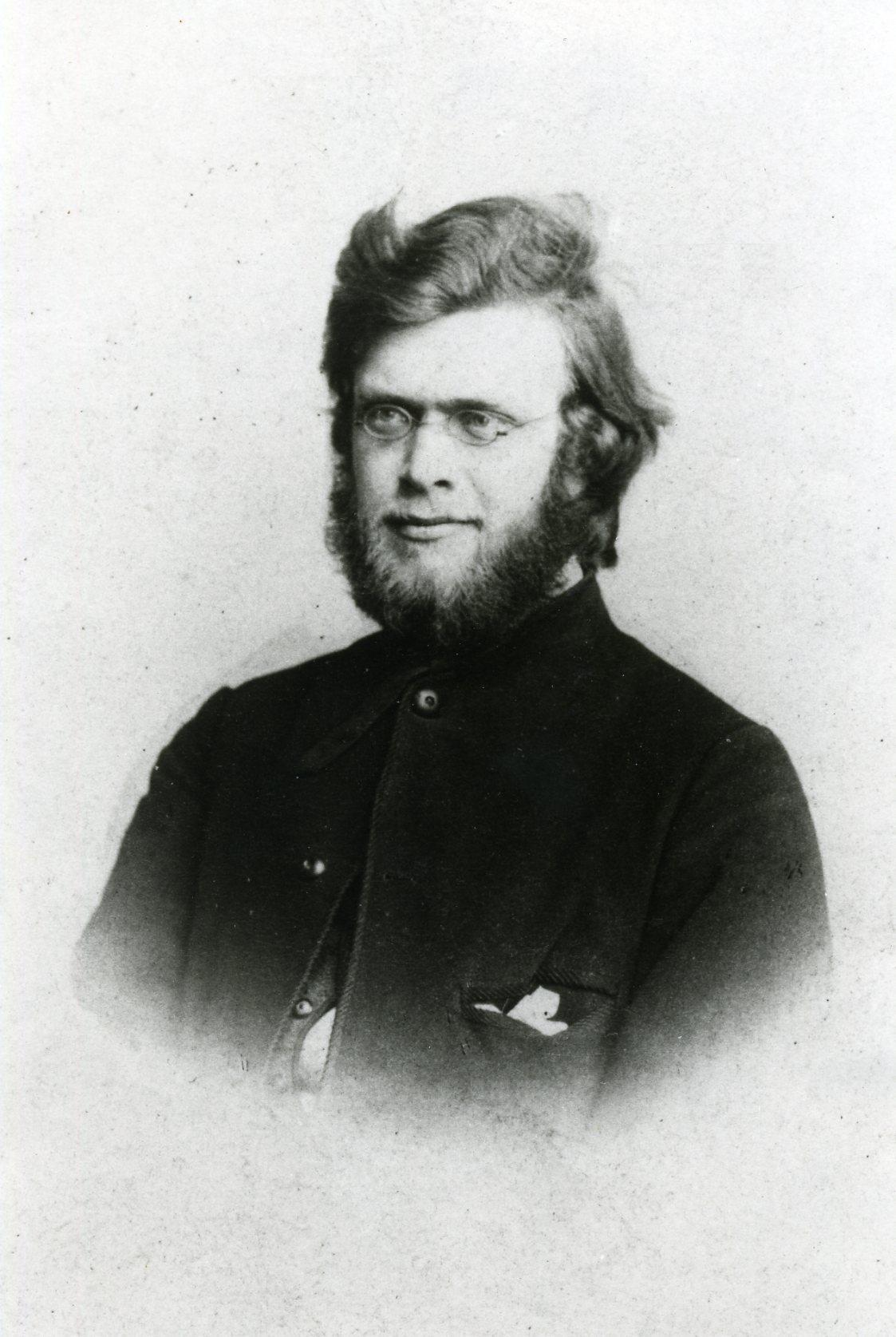
- Photo by Christian Olsen, Chra. 1866.
- Born: Gerhard August Schneider; 6 January 1842; Flekkefjord, Norway
- Died: 14 January 1873 (aged 31); Antwerp, Belgium
- Education: J.F. Eckersberg’s Art School in Kristiania (1867–1868); Det kongelige Akademie for de skiønne Kunster, Copenhagen (1868–1870); Koninklijke Academie voor Schoone Kunsten te Antwerpen or Académie Royale des Beaux-Arts à Anvers (1871–1872)
- Known for: Drawing and Painting
- Notable work: Made illustrations for Norwegian Fairy Tales by Peter Christen Asbjørnsen, i.e. Peik med Narrestikkene, etc., Paa Havets Bund – The Art Carnival in Oslo 1867; Hallingdandsen. Two oil paintings and a lot of drawings at the National Museum for Art (National Gallery) in Oslo.
- Movement: Realism, influenced by Ernest Meissonier (1815–1891)
- Patrons: Schäffers legate, king Carl XV

Gerhard August Schneider (6 January 1842 – 14 January 1873) was a Norwegian artist and illustrator of folk tales.

== Biography ==
(Gerhard) August Schneider was born in Flekkefjord in the county of Vest-Agder, Norway. He was educated from Stavanger Cathedral School in 1860. The family's career choice for him was to study medicine at the University of Christiania (Oslo), but by making illustrations for weekly magazines, he spent more time on art than on the medical program at the University. After his father died he interrupted and ended his medicine studies, and through a competition in 1867, he won a free scholarship at Johan Fredrik Eckersberg’s School of Art in Christiania. With a grant from Schäffer's endowment August Schneider continued his art studies at the Academy in Copenhagen, as a pupil of Frederik Vermehren from 1868 to 1870, and from 1870 until his death at age 31 the Royal Academy of Fine Arts in Antwerp, Belgium.

Schneider's illustrations and informative articles made him a sought-after contributor to magazines, especially Illustreret Nyhedsblad, and occasionally for Skilling-Magazin, Norsk Folkeblad, Almuevennen and Danish publication, Illustreret Tidende. From 1863until 1868 he was permanent illustrator in the witty magazine Vikingen. His drawings were printed after xylography, and had often a political focus. Schneider was a habile portrait painter too.

Schneider made several trips to the valley of Setesdal and was touched by cultural traditions in the valley. He proved himself an accomplished painter of folk life and customs, leaving a rich sketchbook. His main contribution to art was his drawings for P. Chr. Asbjørnsen's Norske Huldre-Eventyr og Folkesagn (1879), and later editions. His illustrations for fairy tales and legends were developed in discussions with the tale collector and publisher Asbjørnsen himself, and built upon studies of peasants, house construction and his own collection of oral tales in Setesdal.

== Bibliography ==
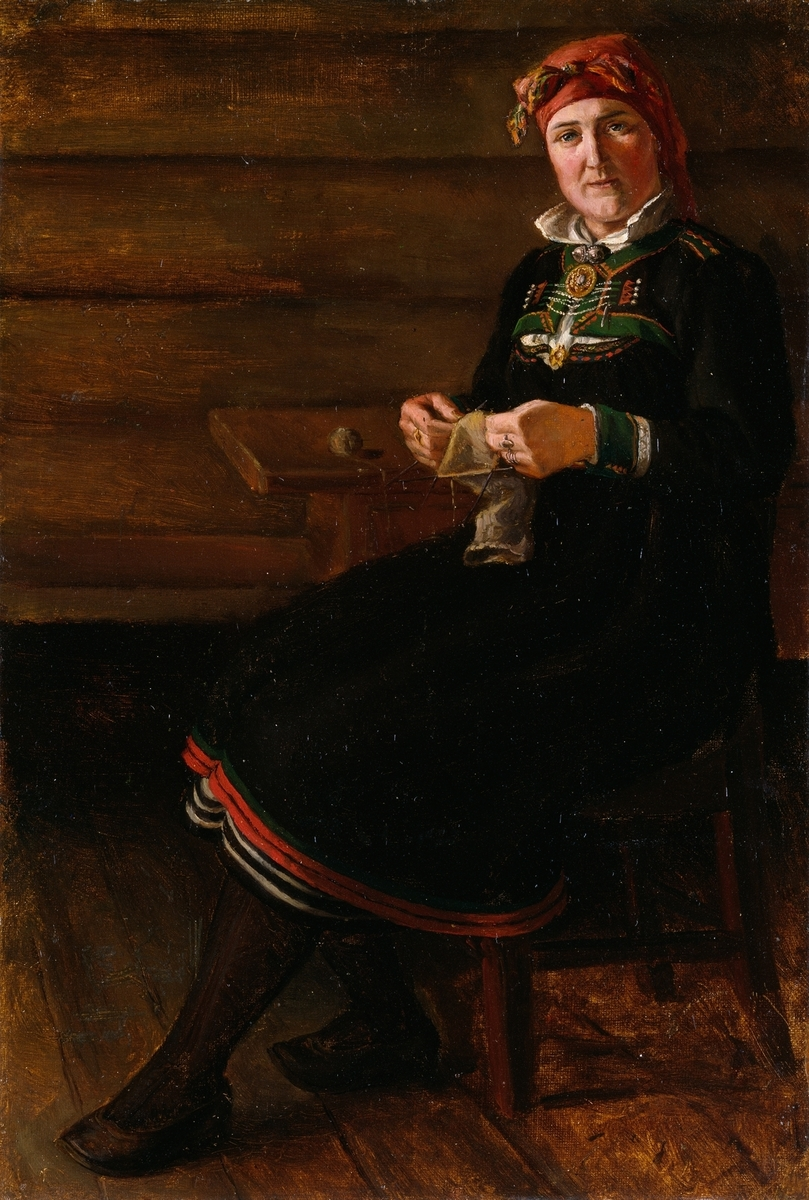
Sittende kvinne i Setesdals-bunad (ca 1870)

- Peter Christen Asbjørnsen: Norske Folke-Eventyr. Ny Samling. (Med Bidrag fra Jørgen Moes Reiser og Optegnelser.) Jacob Dybwad. Christiania 1871.
- Peter Christen Asbjørnsen and Jørgen Moe: Norske Folke- og Huldre-Eventyr i Udvalg. Gyldendalske Boghandels Forlag (F. Hegel & Søn). Kjøbenhavn 1879.
- Erik Henning Edvardsen: Kvitebjørn kong Valemon 1. Gerhard August Schneider – arkitekten bak norske evnetyrillustrasjoner. Norsk Folkeminnelags skrifter nr. 155. Aschehoug. ISBN 82-03-19015-4. Oslo 2005.
- Erik Henning Edvardsen: Kvitebjørn kong Valemon 2. Gerhard August Schneider – den illustrerte eventyrutgaven som aldri utkom. Norsk Folkeminnelags skrifter nr. 157. Aschehoug. ISBN 978-82-03-19197-8. Oslo 2007.
- Erik Henning Edvardsen: Kvitebjørn kong Valemon 3. Gerhard August Schneider – Setesdals folkloristiske oppdager. Norsk Folkeminnelags skrifter nr. 163. Aschehoug. Oslo 2010. ISBN 978-82-03-19864-9.
- Alfred Sinding-Larsen: "Gerhard August Schneider. Med hans tegning til Eventyret 'Gutten og Fanden'". In: Ny illustreret Tidende No. 7. Christiania 15. Februar 1874, p. 51.
