= Johan Ludvig Vibe =

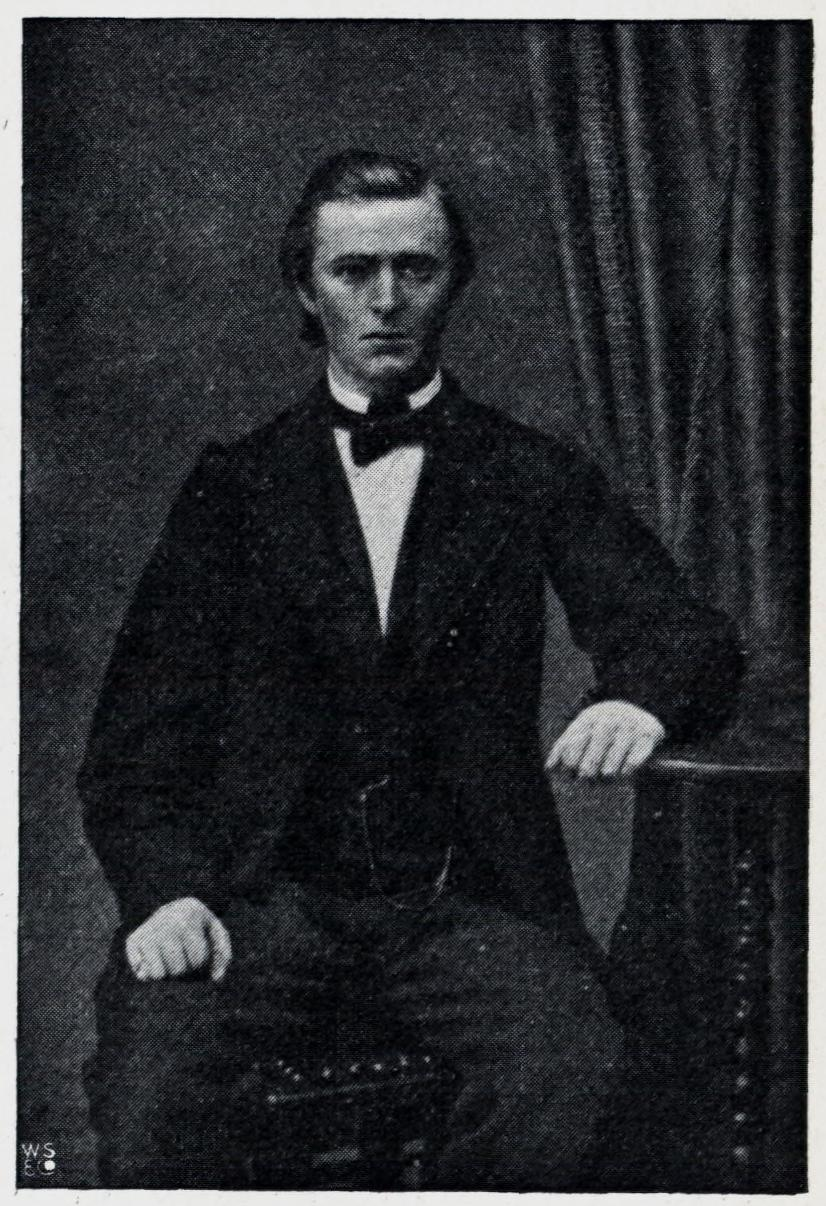
Johan Ludvig Vibe

Johan Ludvig Nils Henrik Vibe (23 November 1840 – 25 March 1897) was a Norwegian topographer, writer, magazine editor and theatre director.

== Biography ==
Vibe was born in Kristiania (now Oslo), Norway, on 23 November 1840. He co-founded the satirical magazine Vikingen in 1862. From 1877 to 1879 he served as artistical director for Christiania Theater. Among his works are Alexander Møllers erindringer from 1875, and contributions to the multi-volume series Norges land og folk.

Vibe died on 25 March 1897.
