= Herman Johan Foss Reimers =

Norwegian judge and politician

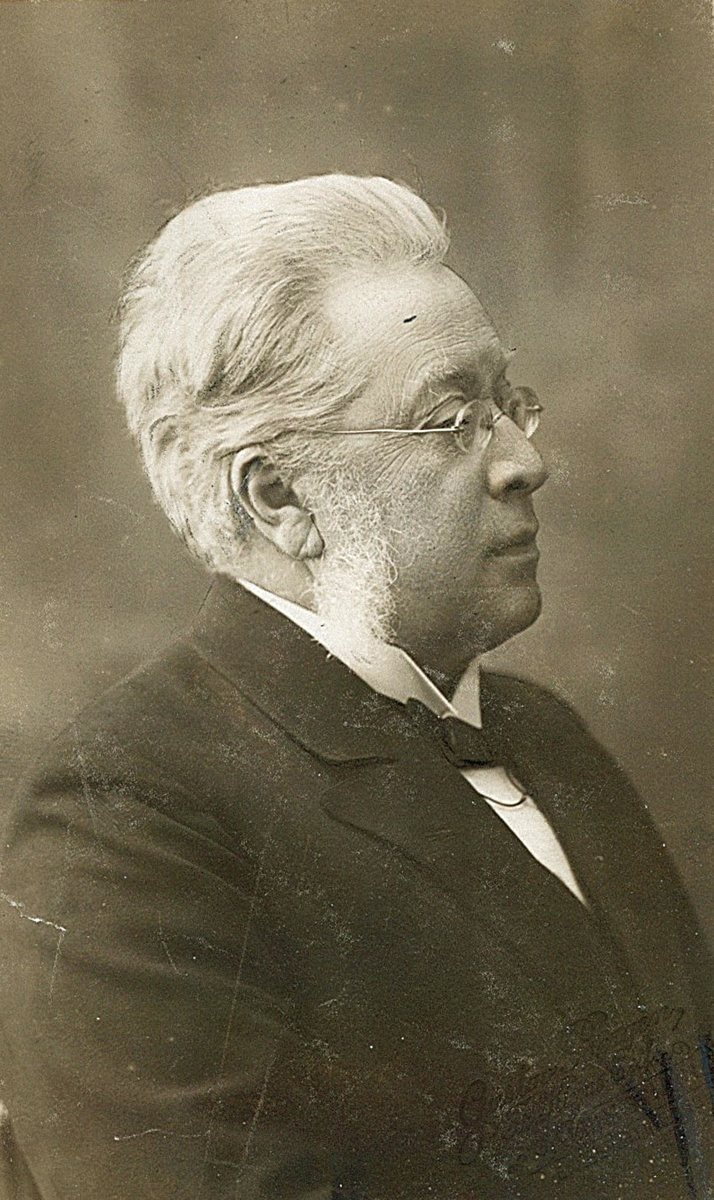
Herman Johan Foss Reimers, ca. 1920

Herman Johan Foss Reimers (15 September 1843 – 7 February 1928) was a Norwegian judge and politician for the Conservative Party.

== Background ==
Reimers was born at Bergen in Hordaland, Norway. He was cand. jur. in 1867.

== Career ==
Reimers served in the Ministry of Finance in 1878. From April to June 1884, he was Councillor of State and Chief of the Norwegian Minister of Finance as a part of the short-lived Schweigaard's Ministerium in the cabinet of Prime Minister Christian Homann Schweigaard. From 1884, he was a Supreme Court Assessor.

He was a member of Kristiania (now Oslo) city council from 1887 to 1892, and he served the term 1889–1891 as a member of the Parliament of Norway, representing the constituency of Østerrisør.

== Personal life ==
His granddaughter, Mimi Reimers, married Olaf D. Thommessen.

Political offices
Preceded by Christian Homann Schweigaard	Norwegian Minister of Finance; April 1884–June 1884	Succeeded by Baard Madsen Haugland
