= Jan Bull =

Norwegian writer (1927–1985)

Jan Bull (7 January 1927 – 16 December 1985) was a Norwegian author and theater instructor. Born in Paris, he was son of the Norwegian poet Olaf Bull and the grandson of author Jacob Breda Bull.

== Bibliography ==
- 13 poetry – poetry (1957).
- Marianne – (1959)
- Sommerfuglene (1960)
- Den siste fuglen – poetry (1961)
- Sodoma – poetry (1964)
- En vanligvis godt underrettet kilde – poetry (1967)
- Masker – poetry (1976)
- Døden ville lese Dickens – novel (1981)

== Awards ==
1981– Riksmål Society Literature Prize
