= Coat of arms of Lillehammer =

The coats of arms of Lillehammer was approved by Royal resolution on April 4, 1898. It was created by the artist Andreas Bloch (1860–1917). The design depicts a Birkebeiner (soldier of a Norwegian faction during a war in the 12th and 13th centuries). This motif was chosen following a public competition. The official coat of arms also features a golden mural crown with three towers.

== Sources ==
- Heraldry of the World: Lillehammer
