= Sylvia Raphael =

South African–Israeli spy (1937 – 2005)

- סילביה רפאל
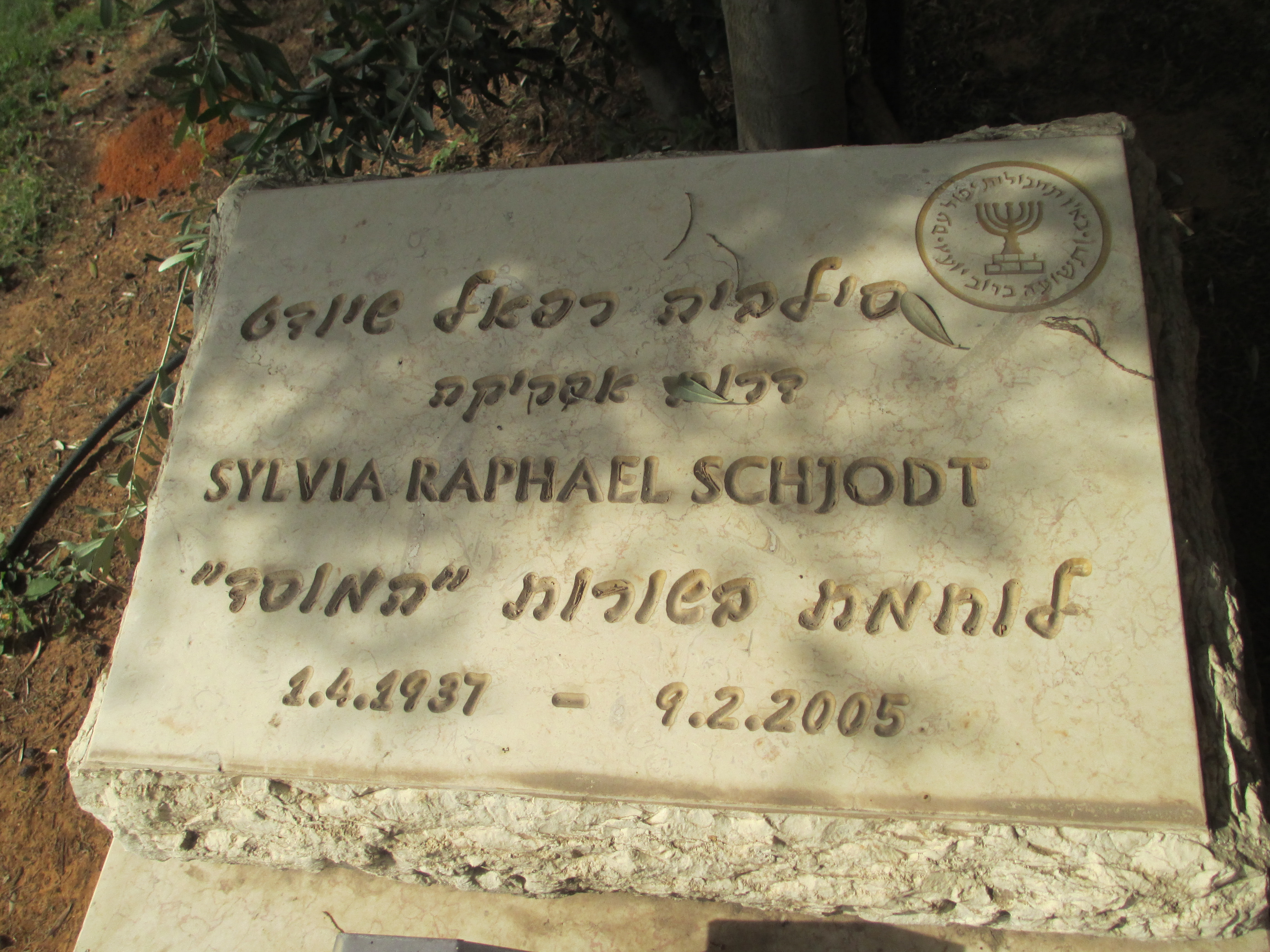
- Sylvia Raphael's grave in the Ramat HaKovesh cemetery
- Born: 1 April 1937; Graaf Reinet, South Africa
- Died: 9 February 2005 (aged 67); Pretoria, South Africa
- Employer: Mossad
- Notable work: Operation Wrath of God
- Spouse: Annæus Schjødt Jr.
- Call sign: Patricia Roxborough
- Status: Released and deported from Norway in 1975
- Criminal charges: Murder, espionage, use of forged documents
- Penalty: 5.5 years in prison

Sylvia Raphael Schjødt (born 1 April 1937 – 9 February 2005) was a South African-born Israeli Mossad agent, convicted of murder for her involvement in the Lillehammer affair in Norway.

== Biography ==
Sylvia Raphael was born in Graaf Reinet, South Africa to a Jewish father and Christian mother. She was raised as a Christian. In 1963, after witnessing an antisemitic incident in her native country, she immigrated to Israel. She lived on a kibbutz and later worked as a teacher before moving to Tel Aviv, where she was recruited by Mossad.

Raphael married her Norwegian defense attorney, Annæus Schjødt. In 1977, she was deported but two years later obtained a residence permit. In 1992, she settled in her native South Africa. She died in February 2005, aged 67, from cancer.

Raphael is buried in the cemetery of Kibbutz Ramat HaKovesh.

== Espionage career ==
After training she attained the rank of “combatant,” the highest rank for a Mossad agent, which qualified Raphael to operate in foreign countries. She was sent to Paris in the guise of a freelance journalist with a Canadian passport in the name of real-life Canadian photojournalist Patricia Roxborough.

When the Israeli government decided to track down the Black September operatives who committed the Munich massacre in Munich, West Germany, in 1972, Raphael provided valuable intelligence that led to the killing of three. She was then assigned to a Mossad team. This was a covert operation directed by Mossad to assassinate individuals involved in the 1972 Olympics Munich massacre called Operation Wrath of God.

Raphael was part of a group of Mossad agents who murdered Morocco-born waiter Ahmed Bouchiki (brother of Chico Bouchikhi) in Lillehammer, Norway, on 21 July 1973, in a case of mistaken identity that became known as the Lillehammer affair. The agents claimed to have mistaken Bouchiki for Ali Hassan Salameh, the chief organizer for Black September who had planned the Munich massacre.

Raphael was arrested shortly after the killing. On February 1, 1974, the Eidsivating Court of Appeal convicted her of planned murder (the most serious murder conviction under Norwegian law), espionage, and use of forged documents. Despite being sentenced to five-and-a-half years in prison, she was released after serving 15 months and deported from Norway as a foreign criminal in May 1975, as foreigners convicted of serious crimes are routinely deported after serving their sentences.

== Commemoration ==
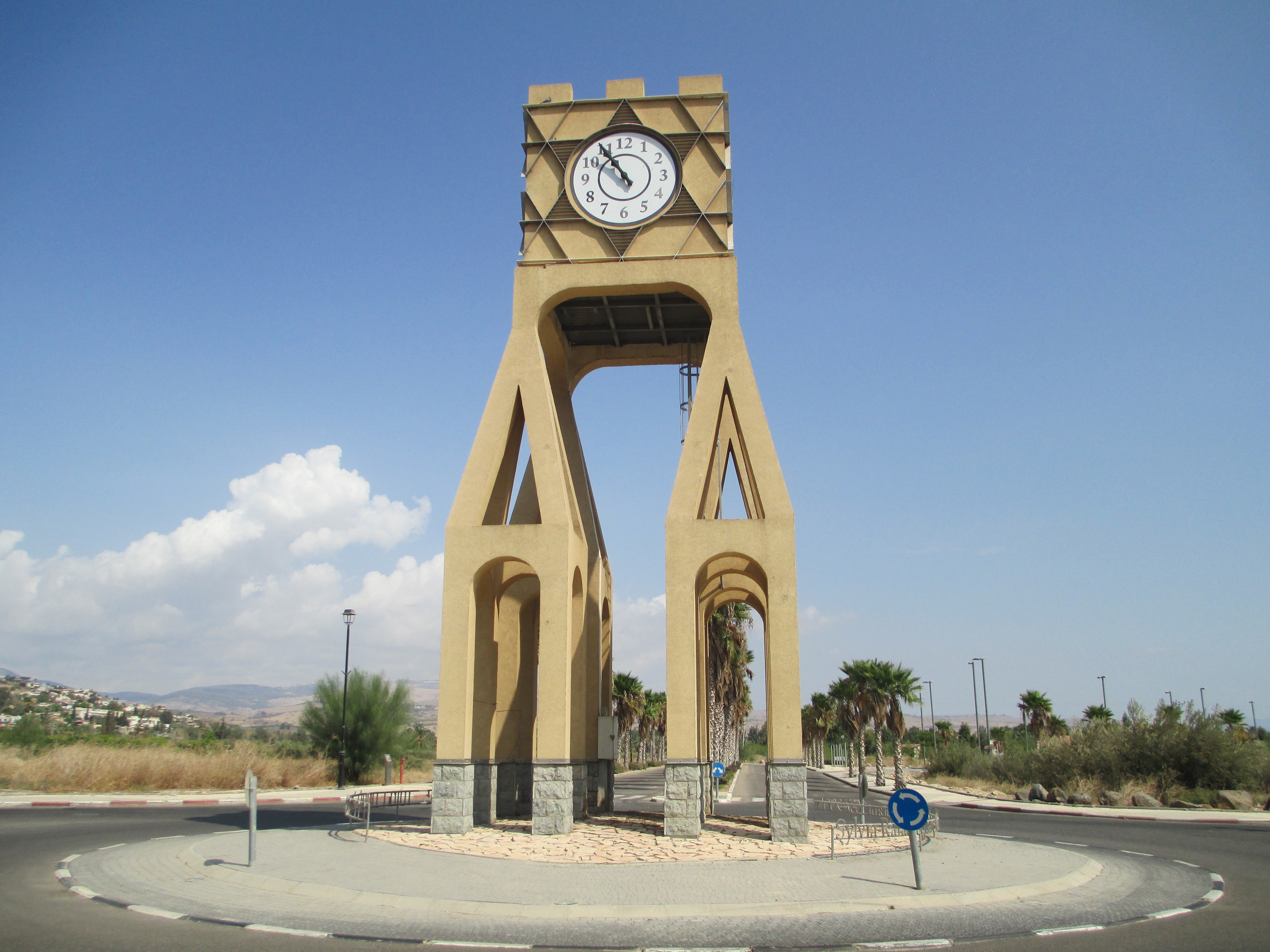
Sylvia Raphael roundabout

A roundabout named after her was erected in the Israeli town of Migdal.

In 2016, director Saxon Logan compiled a documentary movie on her life called Sylvia: Tracing Blood.

In 2023, an exhibit of her photography opened at the Yitzhak Rabin Center in Tel Aviv presenting her output as a photojournalist. The show includes portraits of Gamal Abdel Nasser and Anwar Sadat, scenes of flooding in Yemen, social unrest in Djibouti, as well as daily life in Lebanon and Jordan.
