= Annæus Schjødt =

Norwegian lawyer (1888–1972)

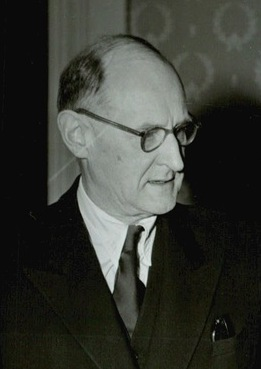
Annaeus Schjødt, 1952.

Annæus Schjødt (7 March 1888 – 12 October 1972) was a Norwegian lawyer. He is best known as the prosecutor of Vidkun Quisling.

== Personal life ==
He was born in Kristiania as a son of Attorney General Annæus Johannes Schjødt (1857–1923) and Laura Marie Rømcke (1860–1893). In October 1914 he married Hedevig Petersen (1892–1966). The two were the parents of Annæus Schjødt Jr. and Karen Hedevig Schjødt, who married chief physician Thorstein Guthe.

== Career ==
He took the examen artium in 1907 and the cand.jur. degree in 1911. He worked in Hadeland and Land District Court from 1913 to 1914. He was a junior solicitor in the law firm Bredal, Christiansen & Fougner from 1914, and lawyer from 1917 to 1920. He started his own firm in 1936. By the mid-1930s the firm was called Fougner, Schjødt, Grette og Smith.

During the occupation of Norway by Nazi Germany, Schjødt and his wife joined the resistance organization 2A. He had to flee to Sweden in the spring of 1942 and at the Norwegian legation in Stockholm he became leader of the refugee office. His wife was active in the sub-department, the sports office. During Schjødt's time the office moved to Kjesäter. In the autumn of 1943 the couple were ordered to move to London where the Norwegian government-in-exile was seated. Schjødt became leader of Norges Luftfartstyre. He also used his background in law to lead the commissions London-utvalg I and London-utvalg II, which prepared the principles for treason trials against Norwegians after the war.

After the war, Schjødt was chosen as the prosecutor in the most high-profiled treason case in Norway, the Court of Appeal case against Vidkun Quisling. He called for the death sentence, which was unanimously agreed to in the Court of Appeal, and also in the Supreme Court. Other cases include the treason trials against Kjeld Stub Irgens and Axel Heiberg Stang and the review trial of Halldis Neegård Østbye.

He was a board chairman of Forsikringsselskapet Viking and board member of Forsikringsselskapet Minerva and Avviklingsinstituttet. In 1965 he was decorated as a Commander of the Order of St. Olav. He died in October 1972 in Oslo.
