= Vikingen =

Norwegian satirical magazine

Vikingen (meaning The Viking in English) is a former Norwegian satirical magazine, published from 1862 to 1947. Among the contributors were the satirical illustrators Olaf Krohn, Andreas Bloch, Gustav Lærum and Olaf Gulbransson.

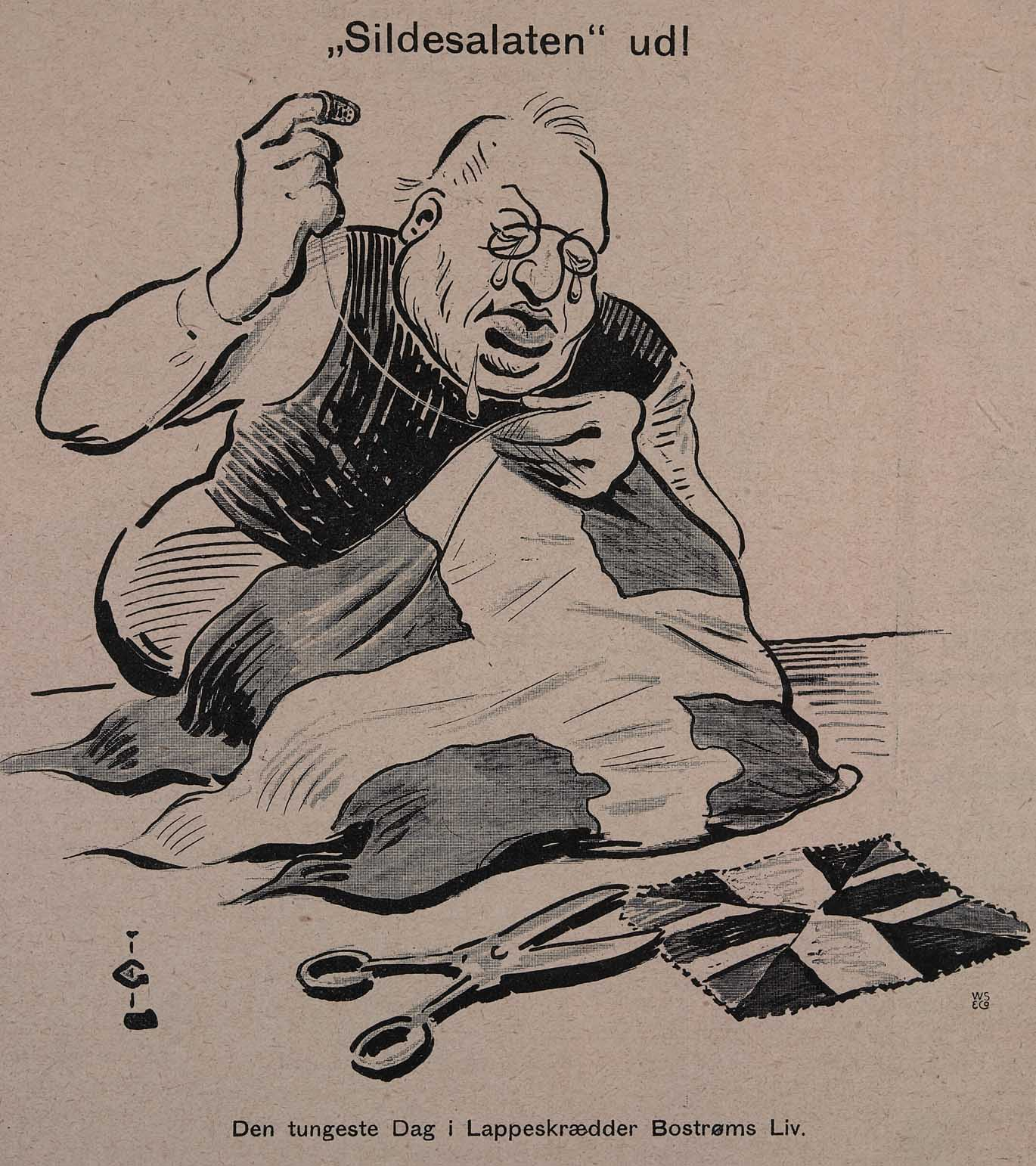
Swedish prime minister Erik Gustaf Boström with the union badge of Sweden and Norway. Caricature by Gustav Lærum in Vikingen 1905

== History and profile ==
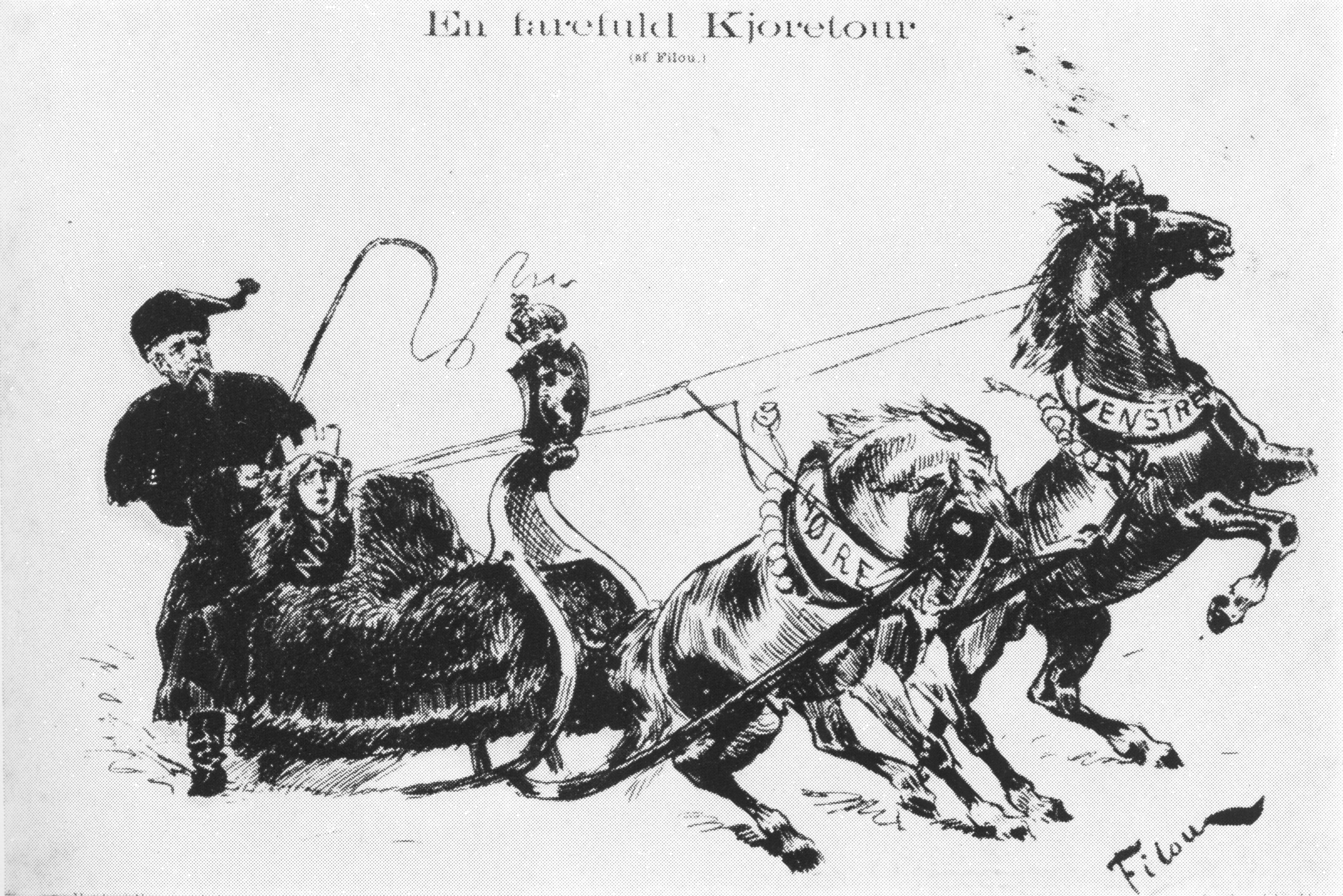
A dangerous ride during the impeachment in Norway, 1884. Caricature drawn for Vikingen by Olaf "Filou" Krohn.

The weekly comic magazine Vikingen was established by printer Henning Tønsberg in Kristiania in 1862. The first issue was published on 4 October 1862. Johan Ludvig Vibe, Johan Schønheyder and Olaf Skavlan were also instrumental in the establishment of the magazine and they worked as editors.

In the beginning the magazine had only 11 subscribers, but the magazine attracted some attention and it soon became an important, if not exactly serious, organ of public debate, humour and satire.

Contemporary celebrities were frequently featured. Among the first people frequently parodied in the magazine's columns was the young playwright Henrik Ibsen; he strongly disliked being a subject of rumors. To keep the writers' identity hidden, editorial meetings were held in secret at a back room of Jacob L'Orsas Café. The first illustrator was August Schneider, who designed the magazine's first title vignette in 1862, and further was member of the editorial council. He was many years later followed by the likes of Olaf Krohn, Andreas Bloch, Gustav Lærum and Olaf Gulbransson.

The magazine ceased publication in 1947.

== Cultural references ==
The magazine startles the unnamed hero of Knut Hamsun's novel Hunger (1890) when it is offered to him while lost in thought.
