= Andreas Bloch =

Norwegian artist (1860–1917)

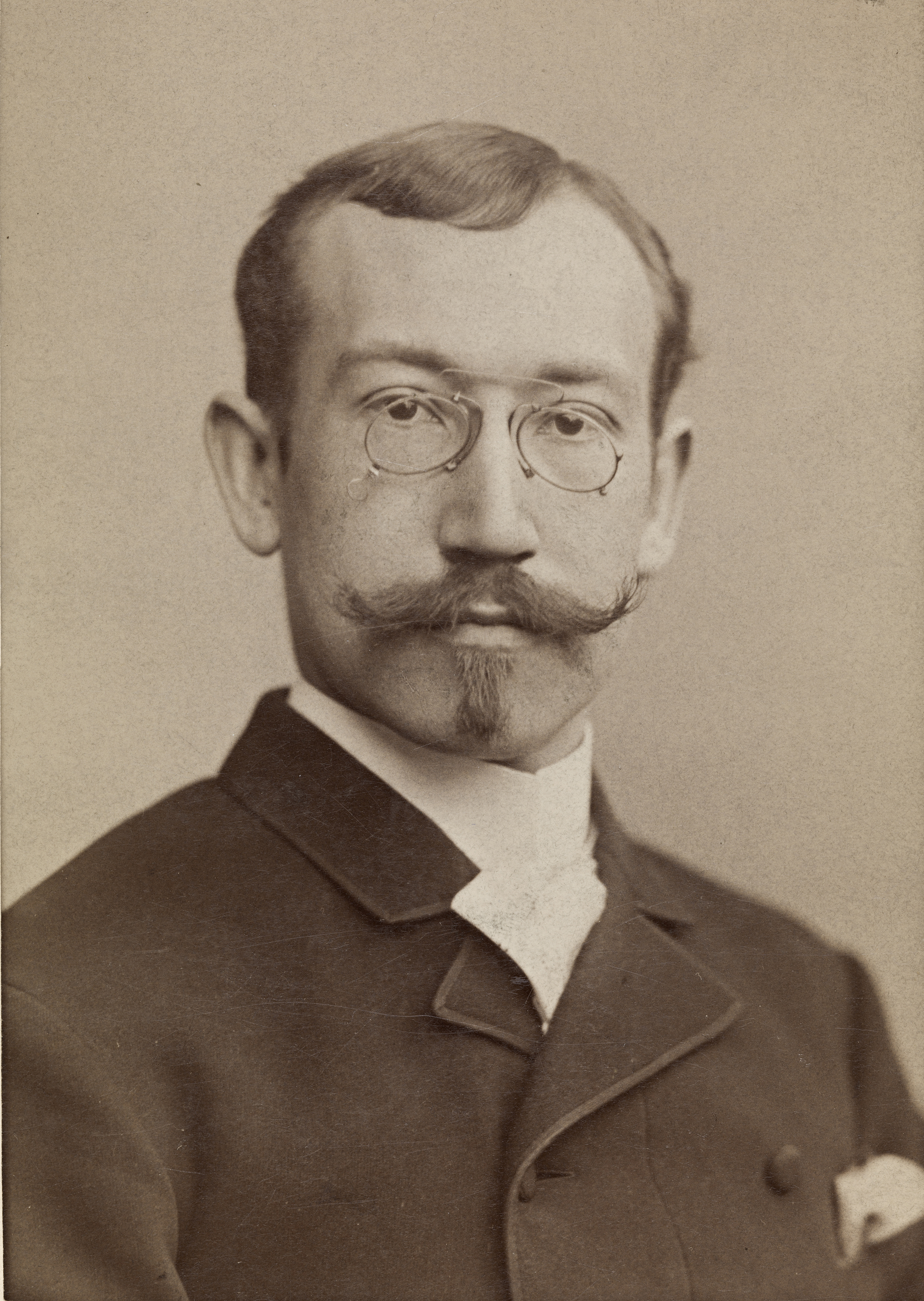
- Bloch (1884)
- Born: 29 July 1860; Skedsmo, Norway
- Died: 11 May 1917 (aged 56); Kristiania
- Occupations: Painter, illustrator and costume designer

Andreas Bloch (29 July 1860 – 11 May 1917) was a Norwegian painter, illustrator and costume designer.

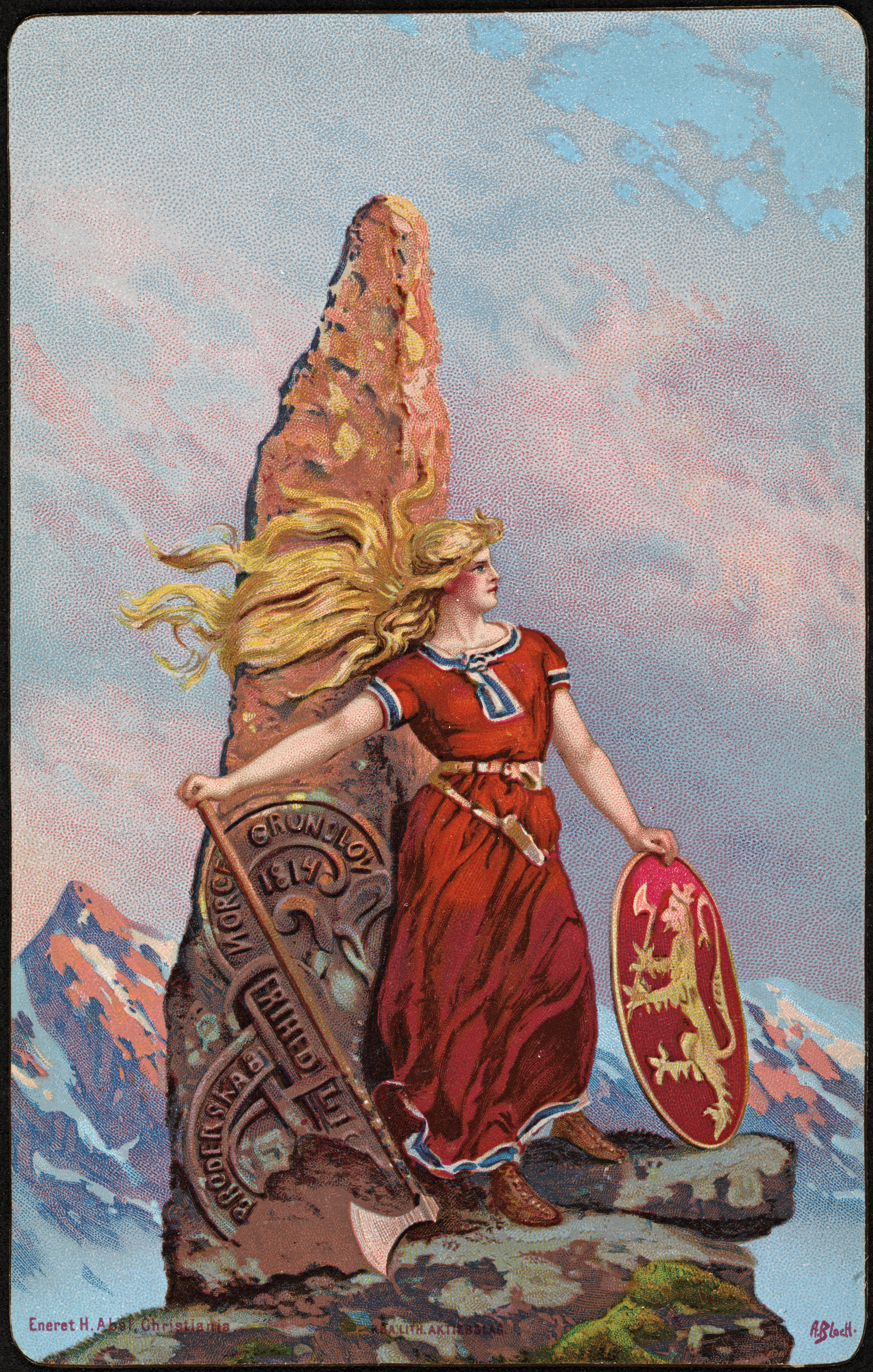
Romantic nationalist postcard, text Frihed, Lig(hed), Broderskab, Norge(s) Grundlov 1814. ("Liberty, Equality, Fraternity, Constitution of Norway 1814") Andreas Bloch (1905)

== Biography ==
Andreas Schroeter Schelver Bloch was born on the Hellerud farm in Skedsmo, in Akershus county, Norway, as the son of Jens Peter Blankenborg Bloch (1817–1892) and Anne Julie Margrethe Schroeter (1827–1895).

Andreas Bloch was a student at the art school of Knud Bergslien from 1878 until 1879. He studied at the Art Academy of Düsseldorf (Kunstakademie Düsseldorf) under Johann Peter Theodor Janssen from 1880 until 1881, and made study tours to Belgium, Paris and Leipzig.

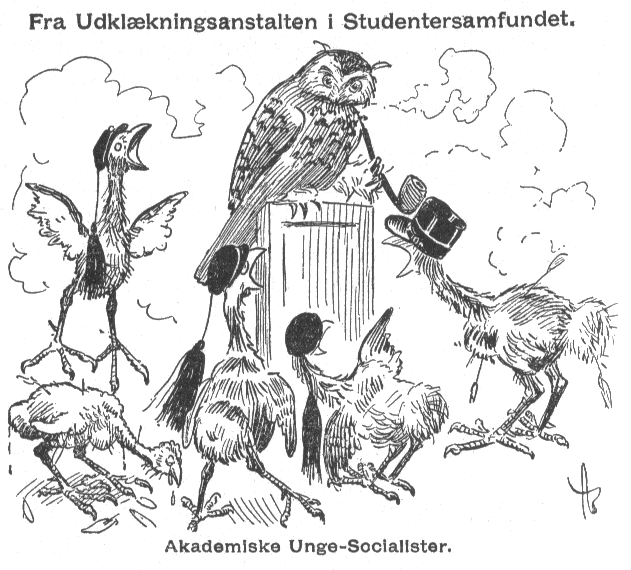
Caricature from Korsaren. Andreas Bloch (1908)

Bloch is remembered primarily for his drawings. He delivered illustrations to the satirical magazines Vikingen, Krydseren and Korsaren, illustrated numerous books, and designed costumes for Christiania Theater and Nationaltheatret. He designed posters and theatrical costumes, as well as portraits. He designed the Coat of arms of Lillehammer. He also designed the Holmenkollen Medal, an honorary skiing award issued by the Skiforeningen in Norway since 1895.

Bloch illustrated books by several Norwegian authors including works by children's author, Margrethe Aabel Munthe (Aase fiskerpike, 1912), by educator, Nordahl Rolfsen, (Vore fædres liv, 1898), by adventurer Henrik August Angell (Vor sidste Krig 1807–1814, 1905) and author Jacob Breda Bull (Af Norges Frihedssaga, 1899 ). He delivered illustrations to Fridtjof Nansen's expedition books Paa ski over Grønland (on his Greenland expedition) and Fram over Polhavet (Nansen's Fram expedition).

He also painted some historical subjects including the coronation of King Haakon VII of Norway and Queen Maud (Kong Haakon og Dronning Mauds kroning i Nidarosdomen, 1906) in Nidaros Cathedral. His works are represented in both the National Gallery and in Oslo City Museum.

== Personal life ==
He was married in 1890 to Ingeborg Elise Tellefsen (1869-1918). He died in Kristiania in 1917. Bloch was buried at Skedsmo Church.

== Drawings by Andreas Bloch ==
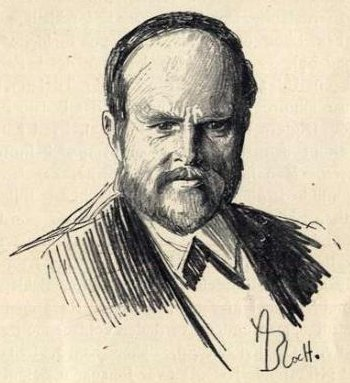
Jacob Breda Bull
(1905)

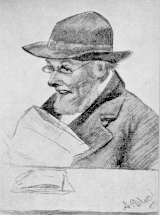
Ivar Aasen
(1886)

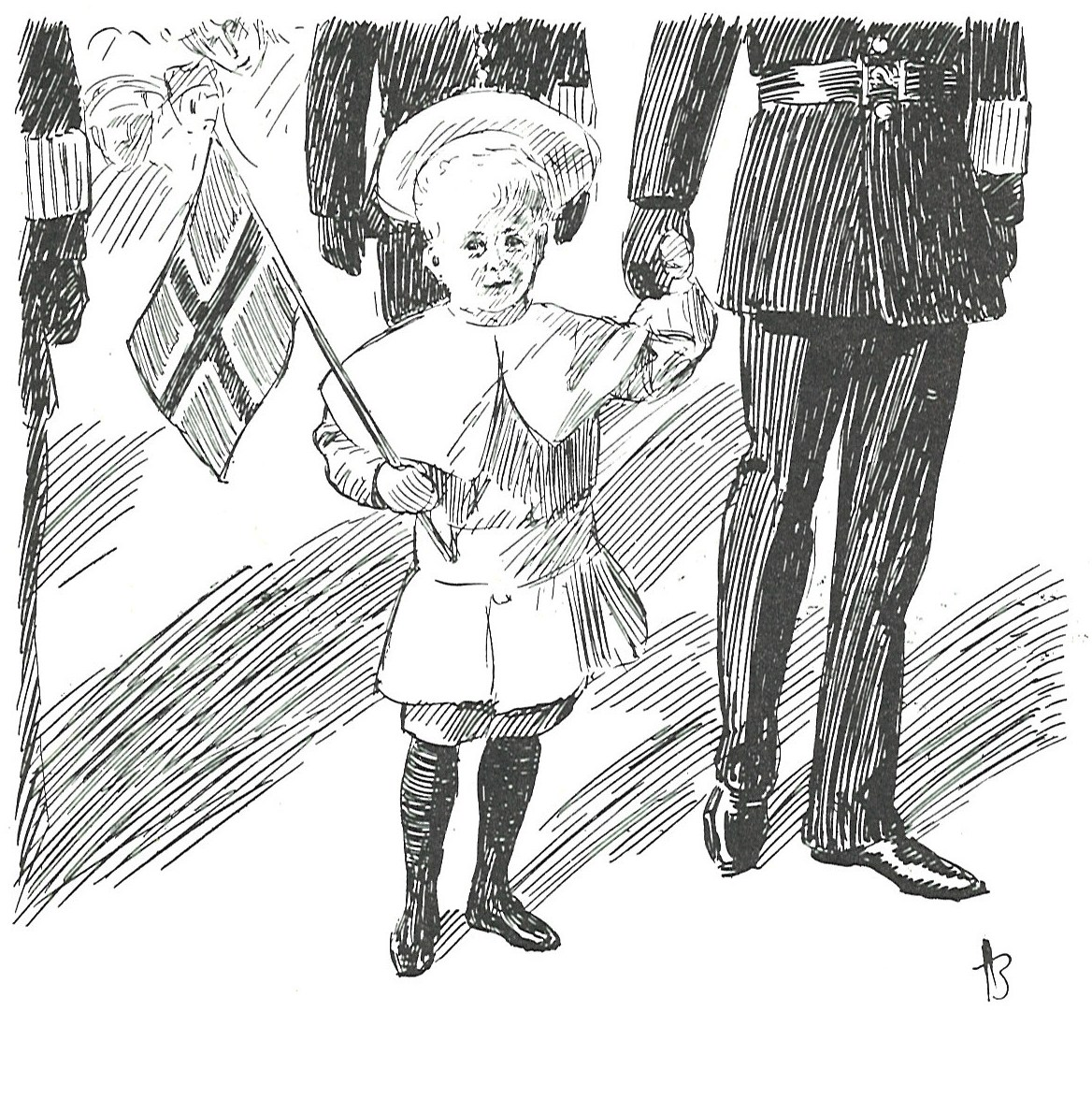
Crown Prince Olav
(1906)

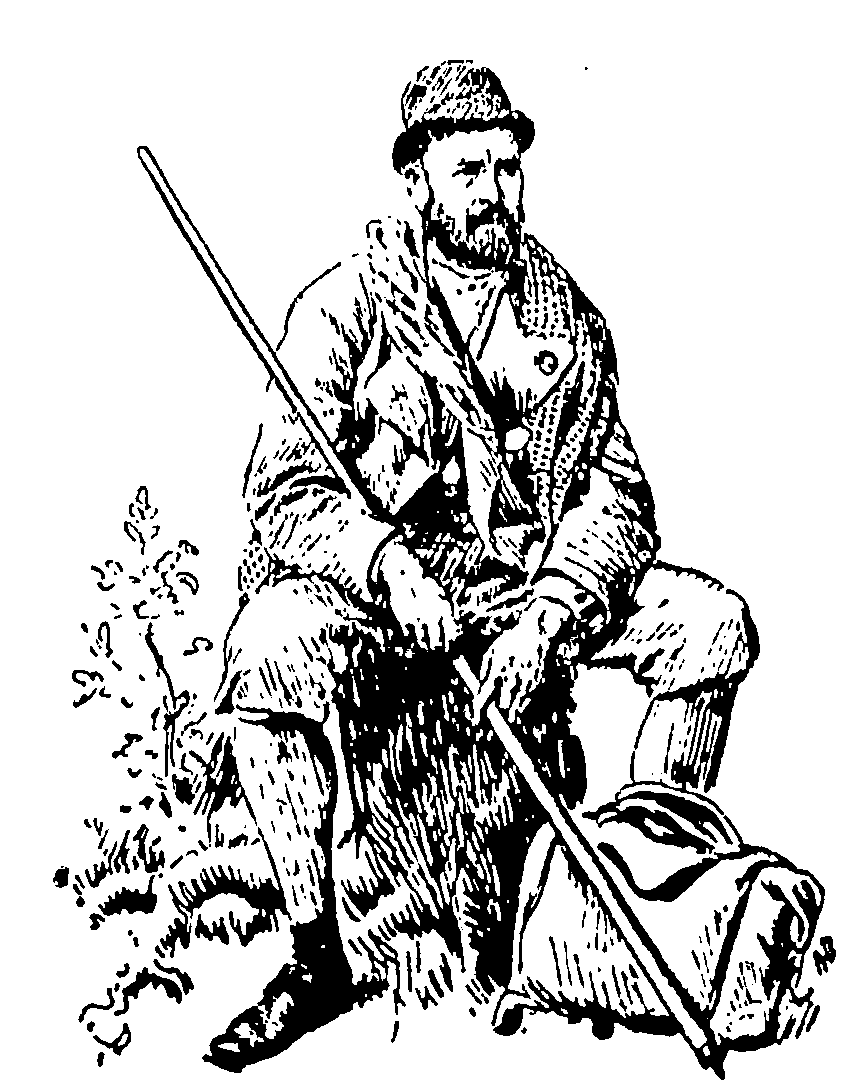
Emanuel Mohn
(1891)
