= Frederik Beichmann =

Norwegian judge and civil servant (1859–1937)

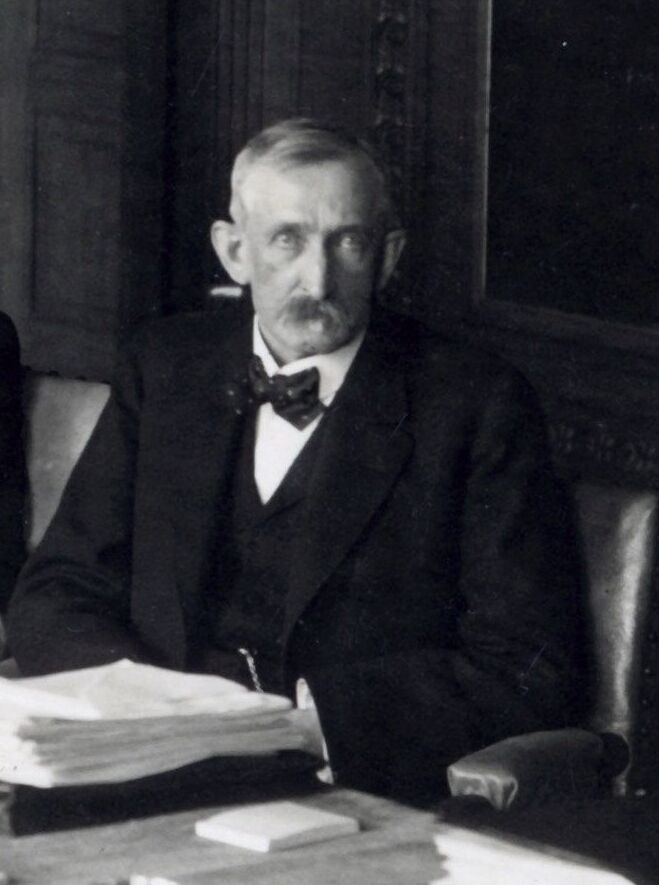
- Born: 3 January 1859; Christiania, Norway
- Died: 29 December 1937 (aged 78); Trondheim
- Occupations: Jurist; Civil servant
- Spouse: Edle Hartmann
- Children: Johan Beichmann
- Awards: Order of St. Olav

Frederik Valdemar Nikolai Beichmann (3 January 1859 – 29 December 1937) was a Norwegian judge and civil servant

He was born in Christiania to military officer Johan Diderik Schlømer Beichmann and Alette Faye. He was married to Edle Hartmann from 1885 to 1899.

Beichmann was appointed at the Ministry of Justice from 1883 to 1898. He moved to Trondheim in 1899, where he served as judge. From 1921 to 1933 he was member of the International Court of Justice in The Hague, and was President of the Institut de Droit International from 1931 to 1932. He was decorated Knight of the Order of St. Olav in 1899, and Commander with Star in 1911.
