= Tidens Tegn =

Norwegian newspaper (1910–1941)

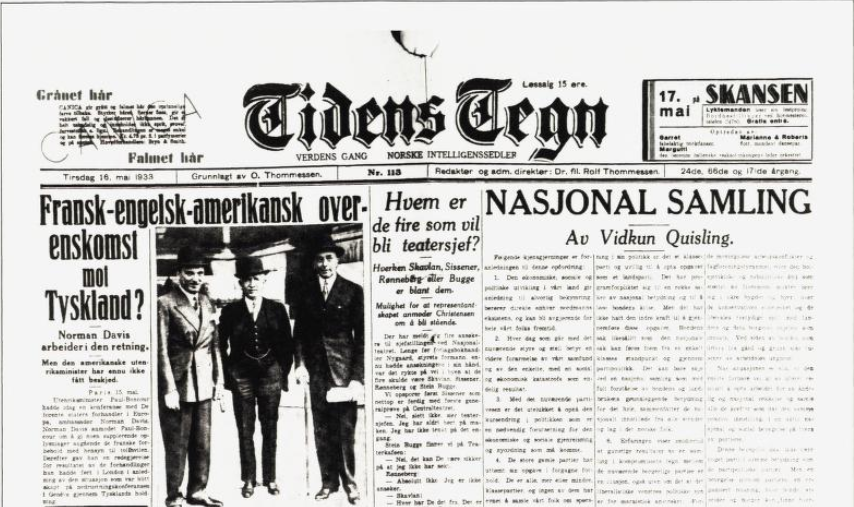
Tidens Tegn 16 May 1933

Tidens Tegn (English: Sign of the Times) is a former Norwegian newspaper, issued in Oslo from 1910 to 1941.

== Editors ==
The founder and first editor-in-chief of Tidens Tegn was Ola Thommessen, who edited the newspaper until 1917. Thommessen had recently left the editor chair of Verdens Gang in protest, bringing much of Verdens Gang´s staff with him. From 1917 to 1938 the editor-in-chief was Rolf Thommessen, son of the founder. Another son Bjørn Thommessen was central as well. Jonas Schanche Jonasen edited the newspaper from 1938 to 1940, when he fled from the country to Great Britain. Ranik Halle was editor from 1940 until the newspaper was discontinued in 1941.

== 1910s and 1920s ==
Politically the newspaper supported the Liberal Left Party (Norwegian: Frisinnede Venstre, later called the Frisinnede Folkeparti). The newspaper became one of the most important and largest in Norway during the 1910s and 1920s. Among the contributors were Einar Skavlan, Olaf Bull, Sven Elvestad, Hans E. Kinck, Herman Wildenvey, Christian Krohg, Nils Collett Vogt, Ronald Fangen, Sigurd Bødtker, Nils Kjær, Erling Winsnes, Carl Nærup and Selma Lagerlöf. Tidens Tegn bought Verdens Gang in 1923, and then acquired Ørebladet in 1924. The newspaper issued an evening edition called Oslo Aftenavis from 1924 to 1932, and the Saturday supplement Film og radio ("Film and Radio"). Tidens Tegn and Oslo Aftenavis were the first Norwegian tabloid newspapers.

== 1930s ==
The newspaper achieved a bad reputation in the late 1920s and the 1930s. The paper published Vidkun Quisling's series of articles Russland og vi, and also early political documents from the Fascist party Nasjonal Samling. During the 1930s the number of subscribers decreased significantly, the newspaper had financial problems, and editor Rolf Thommessen was forced to resign. The new editors did not want to continue the publication during the German occupation of Norway, and Tidens Tegn was discontinued in 1941. One of the editors, Jonas Schanche Jonason, had to leave Norway for London during this period. In 1945 a new newspaper with an old name, Verdens Gang, took over Tidens Tegn’s properties.
