= Rolf Thommessen =

Norwegian politician

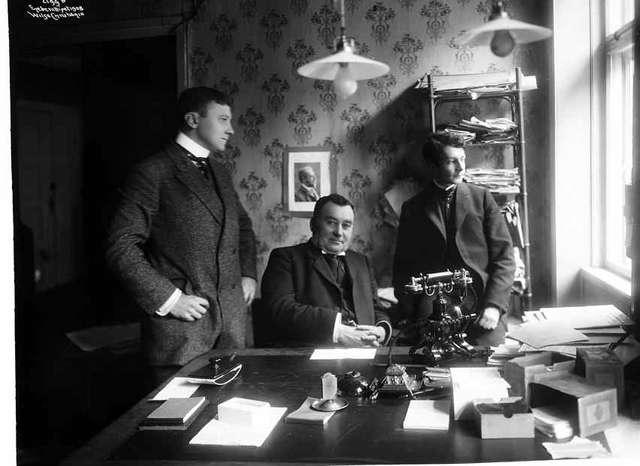
Rolf Thommessen standing on the left, his father, Ola, seated.

Rolf Thommessen (22 July 1879 – 9 December 1939) was a Norwegian journalist, newspaper editor and politician. He edited the newspaper Tidens Tegn from 1917 to 1938. He was a member of the Parliament of Norway from 1928 to 1930, representing the Liberal Left Party (Norwegian: Frisinnede Venstre).

== Personal life ==
Rolf Thommessen was born in Kristiania as the son of newspaper editor Ola Thommessen (1851–1942) and his wife Helga Mathæa Clausen (1854–1931). He was a first cousin of Øystein Thommessen and a granduncle of musician Olav Anton Thommessen. He was married to Anne Dobloug, daughter of Mikkel Dobloug, between 1900 and 1938. He lived in Sandvika and Evje most of his life, and in Risør for a period before his death. He died in Oslo in 1939.

For some time he owned the sailing yacht Wyvern (launched in 1897), which he renamed Havfruen ("the mermaid").

== Professional career ==
=== Art historian ===
Thommessen finished his secondary education in 1897. He then studied art history in Kristiania, under Lorentz Dietrichson, and at the British Museum and in Paris and Berlin. He worked as an art critic for the newspaper edited by his father, Verdens Gang, from 1901 to 1910. He received the dr.philos. degree from the University of Kristiania in 1908, with the thesis Kunstneren i den græske kunst, about Greek art. He issued several books on art history, and worked as an assistant at the Museum of History from 1908 to 1910 and as a research fellow at the university from 1909 to 1910.

=== Newspaper editor ===
When Thommessen's father founded the newspaper Tidens Tegn in 1910, Thommessen joined as editorial secretary, as co-editor from 1915, and took over as editor-in-chief from 1917. He edited the newspaper until 1938, and was also chairman of the board. Tidens Tegn was one of the largest newspapers in Norway in the 1920s, with many influential contributors. Due to the political developments, however, Tidens Tegn lost its popularity during the 1930s. In 1938 Thommessen was forced to resign as editor, and sell his shares.

=== Politics and organisations ===
Thommessen chaired Norsk Luftseiladsforening from 1925 to 1926, and was an important supporter of Roald Amundsen's polar expeditions. He was also a board member of the National Gallery of Norway from 1904 to 1908, and of the Norwegian Press Association from 1910 to 1918.

He was elected to the Parliament of Norway in 1927, representing the constituency Akershus and the Liberal Left Party. He was vice mayor of Bærum from 1929 to 1931. From 1933 he chaired his party, but the Liberal Left Party soon faded away.

He was decorated with the Royal Norwegian Order of St. Olav. A road in Evje in Bærum was named after him in 1949.
