= Annette Thommessen =

French activist (1932–1994)

- Born: Annette Arosa; 20 May 1932; Paris, France
- Died: 6 December 1994 (aged 62)
- Occupation: Organizational leader
- Children: Olaf Thommessen
- Awards: Fritt Ord Award (1992)

Annette Thommessen (20 May 1932 – 6 December 1994) was a French-born organizational leader who settled in Norway. Engaged for the benefit of refugees, she received the Fritt Ord Award in 1992.

== Biography ==
Thommessen was born in Paris on 20 May 1932, to Maurice Arosa Roosevelt and Raymonde Schaeffer, and married Henrik Peter Thommessen in 1953. She moved to Norway in 1954, and was the mother of politician Olaf Thommessen.

From 1978 onwards she was engaged in the treatment of the Vietnamese boat people, refugees from Vietnam after the Vietnam War. She initiated the establishment of the Norwegian Organization for Asylum Seekers, which she chaired from 1984 to 1994. She received the Fritt Ord Award in 1992, and the Humanist Award in 1993.
