= Annæus Johannes Schjødt =

Norwegian politician

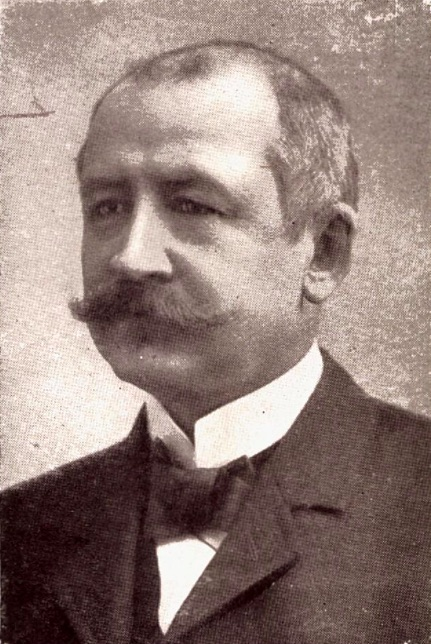
- Regjeringsadvokat Annæus Schjødt
- Born: 2 May 1857; Christiania
- Died: 23 April 1923 (aged 65)
- Occupations: Barrister; Politician
- Known for: Attorney General of Norway; Member of Parliament
- Spouse: Edle Hartmann (second wife)
- Children: Annæus Schjødt
- Relatives: Annæus Schjødt Jr. (grandson)

Annæus Johannes Schjødt (2 May 1857 – 23 April 1923) was a Norwegian barrister.

He was born in Christiania to Simon Peter Schjødt and Andrea Emilie Schriver. He was married to Laura Marie Rømcke from 1885 to 1892, and to writer Edle Hartmann from 1900. He was the father of jurist Annæus Schjødt.

Schjødt was barrister with access to work with the Supreme Court from 1885. He was member of the Storting from 1894 to 1900. He served as Attorney General of Norway from 1917. He was a co-founder (1884) and board member of the Norwegian Association for Women's Rights.

He was decorated Knight of the Order of St. Olav in 1910.
