= Evje, Akershus =

Evje
- Village
- Interactive map of Evje
- Coordinates: 59°53′59″N 10°30′50″E
- Time zone: UTC+01:00 (CET)

Evje is a district in the municipality of Bærum, Norway. Its population (2007) is 4,010.
