= Sven Elvestad =

Norwegian journalist and author (1884–1934)

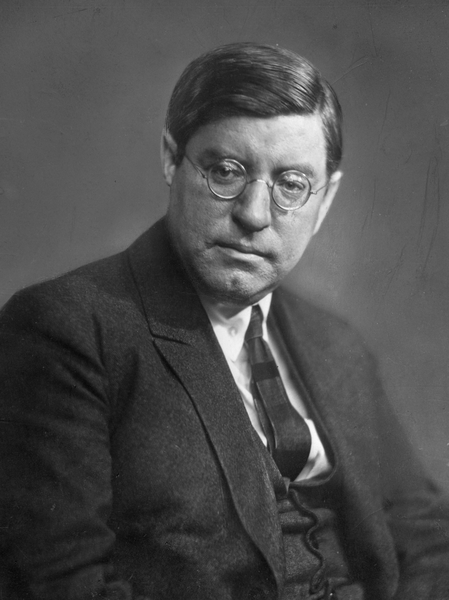
- Born: Kristoffer Elvestad Svensen; 7 September 1884; Fredrikshald, Norway
- Died: 18 December 1934 (aged 50); Skien, Norway
- Other name: Stein Riverton
- Occupations: Journalist; Writer of detective stories

Sven Elvestad (7 September 1884 – 18 December 1934) was a Norwegian journalist and author. He is best known for his detective stories, which were published under the pen name Stein Riverton and translated into several languages, including German and English.

Elvestad was born Kristoffer Elvestad Svendsen, in Fredrikshald (now Halden), a small town near the Swedish border. After, as a young office boy, embezzling money from his employer, he changed his name and started a new life as a journalist in Kristiania (Oslo).

As a reporter, he often staged his own sensations. Among his most famous stunts, was spending a day in a circus lion's cage. But he was also the first foreign reporter to interview Adolf Hitler (whom he, despite his fascist sympathies, described as "a dangerous man").

He started writing crime stories, first as semi-documentary reports from the view of the reporter or as told by the retired police detective Asbjørn Krag (modelled on one or two well-known policemen). Soon Krag was developed into a classical private detective (though still with excellent connections to the police force).

In 1908 Elvestad (under the pen name Kristian F. Biller) created the police detective Knut Gribb: a character that was taken over by several other writers in various magazines and series of paperbacks, and still exists.

Some of Elvestad's Gribb mysteries were later published as Asbjørn Krag books, with the Riverton name on the cover. While this Krag, like Gribb, is a tough, clean-shaven policeman, the classical Krag is a thoughtful and somewhat mysterious, balding man in early middle age, wearing a goatee and pince-nez.

Riverton's masterpiece was published already in 1909: Jernvognen (The Iron Chariot). This is a thriller, narrated in a neo-romantic style reminiscent of Knut Hamsun by a guest at a seaside hotel in Southern Norway. Two violent deaths are connected to a local ghost legend. The possible connections puzzle the narrator, and he finds himself threatened by the visiting detective, Krag. The narrative is complex, with a point of view that lets the author juggle several levels of knowledge: what puzzles the reader might, or might not, also puzzle the narrator and the murderer. In this novel, Elvestad used a certain narrative trick that was later ascribed to Agatha Christie.

In later thrillers (of which some were published under his real name) Elvestad plays on Freudian theories of the subconscious. In his latest mysteries, he abandons the Krag character (who was nameless in books attributed to Elvestad) and aims at a more modern, realistic style. Though some of Riverton/Elvestad's stories are high-class thrillers, the quality of his work varies.

The Norwegian Riverton Prize is named after him.
