= Olaf Bull =

Norwegian poet

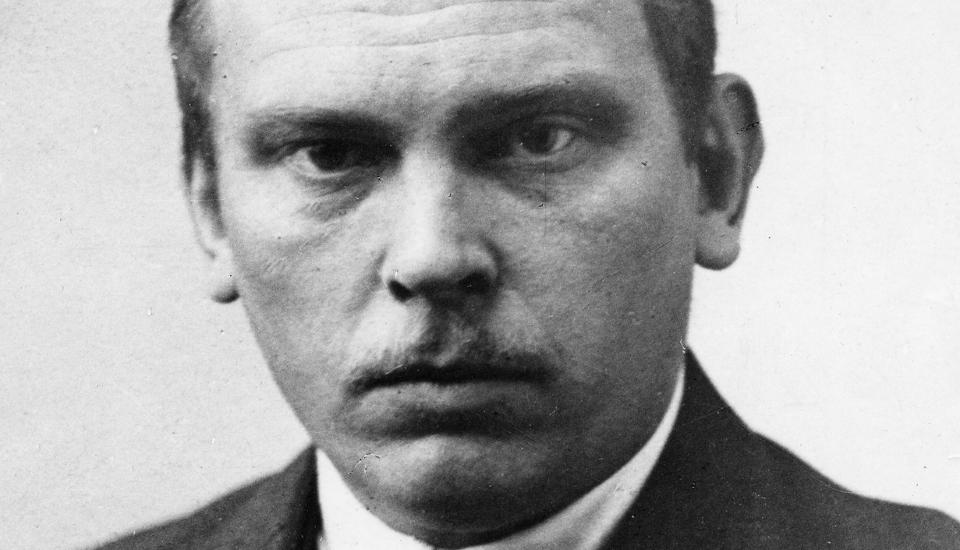
- Born: 10 November 1883; Kristiania, Norway (now Oslo)
- Died: 29 June 1933 (aged 49); Oslo, Norway
- Known for: 6 Nobel nominations

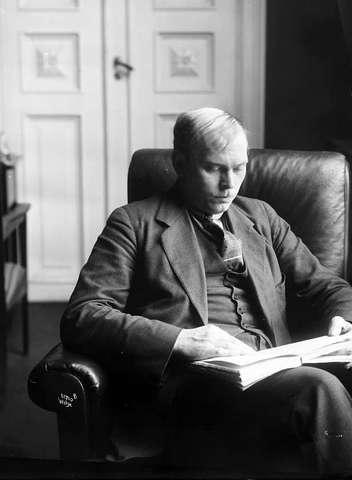
Olaf Bull (1919)

Olaf Jacob Martin Luther Breda Bull (10 November 1883 – 29 June 1933 ) was a Norwegian poet. He was nominated for the Nobel Prize in Literature six times.

== Biography ==
Olaf Bull was born in Kristiania (now Oslo), Norway. His parents were author Jacob Breda Bull (1853–1930) and his second wife Maria Augusta Berglöf (1854–1922). Bull grew up and was mostly raised in Kristiania. At the age of 13, he lived for some time in Hurum in Buskerud, where his father worked as a journalist and editor. In 1899, he started gymnasium at Aars og Voss' skole. He attended Kristiania Cathedral School prior to his graduation from private school in 1902. After his graduation he lived with his family in Rome before returning to Kristiania in 1903 to begin his studies at the university.

Olaf Bull could be considered a polymath because in addition to both modern and classical literature, he mastered philosophy, history, politics, art and science. He spent several years as a journalist for Posten and Dagbladet . He was known as the “Oslo-poet,” but he lived for extended periods in both Italy and in France where his son, poet Jan Bull (1927–1985) was born.

Olaf Bull was married three times and divorced twice. Economic issues coupled with abuse of alcohol had a strong impact on his life. He had a nervous disposition and developed signs of depression. His last year was characterized by illness and alcoholism. He had physical ailments, including partial paralysis and liver damage. Olaf Bull died at age 49 at Ullevål Hospital in Oslo. His urn was placed at Vår Frelsers gravlund.

== His poetry ==
Bull's poetry collection Digte (Poems) (1909) formed the foundation upon which he came to be recognized as Norway's foremost poet. Olaf Bull composed his poetry using what is called in Norwegian sentrallyrikk – poems about “central themes” such as love, sorrow and death. He used fixed stanza patterns and was known for his strong and emotional depictions. His poetry and work conveys a melancholy sense that all is transitory. In spite of this disconsolate tone, his recurring and powerful use of mood, faultless form and expressive voice communicate his belief that, although evanescent, art and beauty are important.

Giovanni Bach described his work in this way:

"His poems reveal a masculine power and a forceful affirmation of his own individuality, notwithstanding the extreme pessimism that often envelopes them in a voluminous thick black veil. His poetry is deeply felt, rich in imaginative and intellectual quality."

Bull utilized his extensive knowledge and artistic strength, but showed an underlying fear and depression. Olaf Bull was known to be anti-authority and was regarded an “outsider” in society, but his poetry demonstrated that he never totally broke with traditional form and structure. Much of his poetry showed a powerful longing for the eternal and persistent. This longing was most apparent when he wrote about classical motifs.

== Bull and Joyce ==
While James Joyce was working on Finnegans Wake, he wanted to insert references to Scandinavian languages and literature, hiring five teachers of Norwegian. Bull was the first one. Joyce wanted to read Norwegian works in the original language, including Peter Andreas Munch's Norrøne Gude- og Heltesagn (Norse Tales of Gods and Heroes). He was looking for puns and weird associations across the barriers of language, which was something Bull well understood. Lines from Bull's poems echo through "this spider's web of words", as Joyce himself called Finnegans Wake, and Bull himself materializes under the name "Olaph the Oxman", a pun on his surname.

In his letters home, Bull mentioned nothing about Joyce, most likely because he often asked his family for money, which would sound unconvincing with him at the same time being a teacher for a world-famous author. It is not known how Joyce got in contact with Bull, but both frequented the bookstore Shakespeare and Company in Paris which was run by Sylvia Beach, who may have brought them in contact with each other. In 1926 Ulysses was issued as an unlicensed copy in the United States, meaning that Joyce would receive no money for it. Together with Beach he wrote a protest letter, intending it to be signed by well-known writers from the whole of Europe. Beach mentions in her memoirs that Joyce was particularly eager to have Bull sign it. Beach tracked Bull, who had left Paris to live in the French countryside. On behalf of Joyce she sent a man there to have the protest signed. Bull's wife Suzanne provided him with a copy of Bull's signature.

== Bibliography ==
=== Works published during his lifetime ===
- Digte (Poems), Gyldendal, 1909
- Nye Digte (New Poems), Gyldendal, 1913
- Mitt navn er Knoph (My Name is Knoph), Narveson, 1914
- Digte og noveller (Poems and Short Stories), Gyldendal, 1916
- Samlede digte 1909–1919 (Collected Poems), Gyldendal, 1919
- Stjernerne (Stars), Gyldendal, 1924
- Metope, Gyldendal, 1927
- De hundrede aar (The Hundred Years), Gyldendal, 1928
- Kjærlighet (Love), Gyldendal, 1929
- Oinos og Eros, Gyldendal, 1930
- Ignis ardens, Gyldendal, 1932

=== Play ===
- Kjærlighetens farse:tre akter (Love's Farce: Three Acts), Aschehoug, 1919, published 1948. Written together with Helge Krog.

=== Posthumously published works ===
- Ekko og regnbue: notater fra en dikters verksted (Echo and Rainbow: Notes From a Poet's Workplace), Gyldendal, 1987. Edited by Frans Lasson.
- Olaf Bull: brev fra en dikters liv (Olaf Bull: Letters from a Poets Life), 2 vols., Gyldendal, 1989. Edited by Frans Lasson
- Ild og skygger: spredte notater fra et dikterliv (Fire and Shadows: Scattered Notes from a Poet's Life), Nørhaven, Viborg, 1991. Edited by Frans Lasson

== Other sources ==
- Suzanne Bull (1974) Ni år: mitt liv med Olaf Bull (Oslo: Aschehoug) ISBN 978-8203061691
- Nete Smith, ed. (2004) Twentieth Century Norwegian Writers (Gale Dictionary of Literary Biography, vol. 297) ISBN 978-0787668341
- Fredrik Wandrup (1995) Olaf Bull og hans samtid. En uro som aldri dør. (Oslo: Gyldendal) ISBN 978-8205219762
