= Verdens Gang (1868–1923) =

Norwegian newspaper

Verdens Gang is a former Norwegian newspaper, issued in Oslo from 1868 to 1923.

It was established as a weekly magazine in 1868, later expanded to three issues a week, and was issued daily from 1885. It was the most widespread political newspaper in Norway for many years, and had considerable influence. The founder and first editor-in-chief was Peder Olsen, who edited the newspaper until his death in 1876. Later Prime Minister Johan Sverdrup was editor from 1876 to 1878, and Ola Thommessen from 1878 to 1910. Øvre Richter Frich held the position from 1910 to 1911, and Axel Otto Normann from 1915 to 1922.

The newspaper was particularly important during the editorship of Ola Thommessen. In addition to turning it into a daily newspaper, he consolidated its ties with the Liberal Party (founded 1884), giving Verdens Gang a strong position in the political scene. Internationally known writers like Bjørnstjerne Bjørnson and Georg Brandes contributed to the newspaper. When Thommessen left in 1910, Verdens Gang declined rapidly, as he brought much of the staff with him, immediately forming a competitor Tidens Tegn. The background was a conflict between Thommessen and Olaf Madsen, an important shareholder and member of the board of directors. Madsen's primary goal was economic profit, and according to Thommessen, Madsen meddled in the affairs of the newspaper, inflicting upon the editorial independence.

Thommessen won widespread support in the conflict, and Tidens Tegn quickly became Norway's largest newspaper, and attracted a variety of known writers, including Sven Elvestad, Olaf Bull, Herman Wildenvey and Selma Lagerlöf. The situation for Verdens Gang was worsened by the depression that followed World War I. In 1920 it absorbed another newspaper Norske Intelligenz-Seddeler, but in 1923 it became defunct—as it was absorbed by Tidens Tegn.

The name Verdens Gang was revived in 1945, used by a new newspaper. The new Verdens Gang, often shortened VG, became Norway's largest newspaper in 1981.
