= LO Stat =

- LO Stat
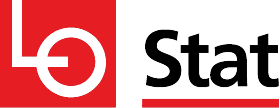
- Founded: 1939 as Statstjenestemannskartellet, (Renamed 1996)
- Headquarters: Oslo, Norway
- Location: Norway
- Key people: Tone Rønoldtangen
- Affiliations: Norwegian Confederation of Trade Unions (LO)
- Website: www.lostat.no

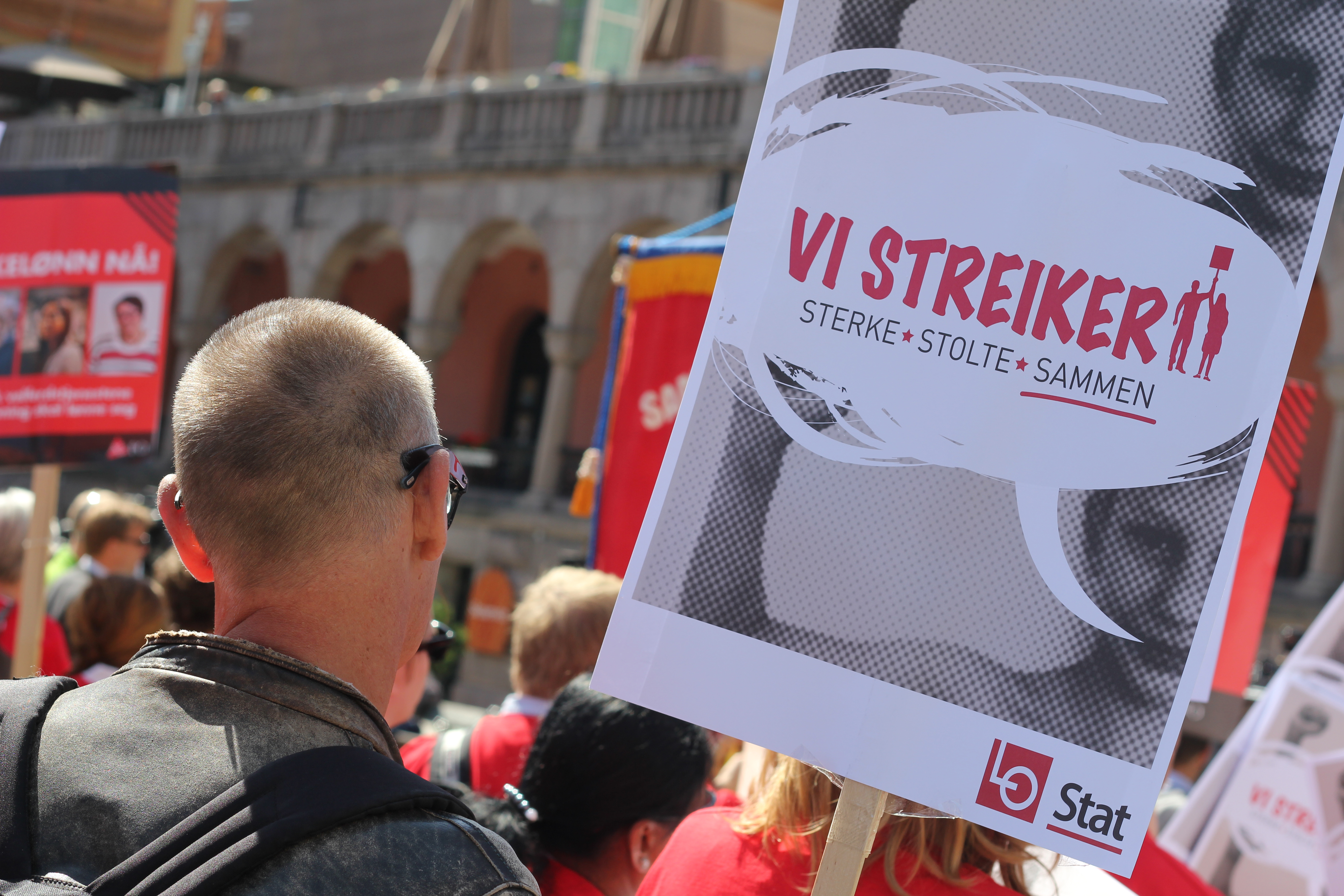
A demonstration in connection with a strike for Norwegian government employees in Oslo in 2012.

LO Stat (LO State) is one of two bargaining structures within the Norwegian Confederation of Trade Unions (LO). LO Stat is the counterpart in negotiations over state employees' wages and conditions with the government and the employer's organisation, Spekter.

It organizes employees of (1) the Norwegian state (Government employees) or (2) of companies that are member bodies of the employers' association Spekter. It was created in 1939 under the name Statstjenestemannskartellet ('the Cartel of Public Servants'). In 1996 it was renamed to LO Stat. It was one of four cartels until 2004, when LO Industri and LO Service were abolished, leaving only LO Stat and, for municipal employees, LO Kommune.

A former chair is Tone Rønoldtangen, unil 2016.

== Affiliated unions ==
The Electrician and IT Workers’ Union (El & IT), Norwegian Union of Municipal and General Employees, (Fagforbundet, NUMGE), Norwegian Engineers’ and Managers’ Association (Forbundet for Ledelse og Teknikk, FLT), Norwegian Union of Social Educators and Social Workers (Fellesorganisasjonen, FO), Norwegian Union of Employees in Commerce and Offices (Handel og Kontor i Norge, HK), Industri Energi, Norwegian Union of Industry and Energy Workers (IE), Norwegian Musicians’ Union (Musikernes fellesorganisasjon, NM), Norwegian Union of General Workers (Norsk Arbeidsmandsforbund , NAF), Norwegian Prison and Probation Officers’ Union (Norsk Fengsels- og Friomsorgsforbund, NFF), Norwegian Union of Railway Workers (Norsk Jernbaneforbund, NJF), National Union of Norwegian Locomotivemen (Norsk Lokomotivmannsforbund, NLF), Norwegian Union of Military Officers (Norges Offisersforbund, NOF), Norwegian Transport Workers' Union (Norsk Transportarbeiderforbund, NTF), Norwegian Civil Service Union (Norsk Tjenestemannslag, NTL), Norwegian Union of Postal and Communication Workers (POSTKOM), Norwegian Union of School Employees (Skolenes Landsforbund, SL).
