= Mari Sanden =

Norwegian trade unionist

Mari Sanden (1951 – June 14, 2022) was a Norwegian trade unionist.

She was hired at Dikemark Hospital after taking the examen artium in 1971. The hospital is located in Asker, where Sanden also resides, but was owned by Oslo Municipality. She became a full-time trade unionist in 1985. In early 1994 she became leader of the Norwegian Union of Municipal Employees in Oslo after Bjørgulv Froyn. The union had 30,000 members at the time.

Later in 1994, the leader of the Union of Municipal Employees died, and Mari Sanden was the closest challenger to Jan Davidsen for the leadership. She lost with 61 against 334 votes. In 1997 she was mentioned as a possible candidate as deputy leader of the Norwegian Confederation of Trade Unions after Gerd-Liv Valla.

Sanden was the leader of the trade union, which changed its name to the Union of Municipal and General Employees in Oslo after a 2003 merger. When Jan Davidsen was finally succeeded as national leader in 2013, by Mette Nord, Sanden was the leader of the electoral committee.
