= NTF =

NTF may refer to:

== Biology ==
- Neurotrophic factors, a family of biomolecules

== Organizations ==
- National Society for Road Safety (Swedish: Nationalföreningen för trafiksäkerhetens främjande), a Swedish road safety organization
- National Task Force, of the Swedish police
- National Turkey Federation, US
- Nigeria Trust Fund
- Norsk Toppfotball, a Norwegian football organization
- Norwegian Tobacco Workers' Union (Norwegian: Norsk Tobakkarbeiderforbund)
- Norwegian Transport Workers' Union (Norwegian: Norsk Transportarbeiderforbund), a trade union in Norway
- Norwegian Union of Textile Workers (Norwegian: Norsk Tekstilarbeiderforbund)
- Number Theory Foundation, US

== Technology ==
- Nachrichtentechnische Fachberichte, a German engineering journal
- National Transonic Facility, a US wind tunnel
- National Transfer Format, for geospatial information, UK
- No Trouble Found, a maintenance term

== See also ==
- NTFS, a file system developed by Microsoft
- NFT (disambiguation)
