= Campaign for the Welfare State =

Norwegian think tank

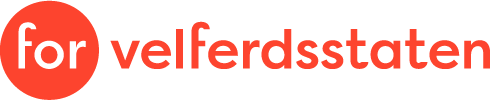
- Formation: 1999; 27 years ago
- Type: Public policy think tank
- Location: Oslo, Norway
- Members: 23 organizations with ca. 1 million members
- Director: Asbjørn Wahl
- Website: velferdsstaten.no

The Campaign for the Welfare State (Norwegian: For velferdsstaten) is a progressive public policy advocacy organization and think tank in Norway, founded in 1999 by six trade unions to promote the welfare state as a political system and associated policies, and to oppose economic liberalism and privatization and strengthen democratic control of the society's resources in particular. It is a broad alliance of 23 trade unions and other organizations representing 1 million members (out of a population of 5 million). Its director is Asbjørn Wahl. The organization organizes the annual Welfare Conference (Velferdskonferansen). Its offices are housed by the Norwegian Union of Municipal and General Employees.

== Members ==
The following national trade unions and associations are members of the organization:

- Arbeidssøkerforbundet
- El&IT-forbundet
- Norwegian Union of Municipal and General Employees
- Norwegian Union of Social Educators and Social Workers
- FO-studentene
- Union of Employees in Commerce and Offices
- Industri Energi
- LO Kommune
- Kvinnefronten
- Kvinnegruppa Ottar
- Landsutvalget for Udelt og Fådelt Skole
- Norwegian Farmers and Smallholders Union
- Norsk Fengsels- og Friomsorgsforbund
- Norsk Folkehøgskolelag
- Norsk Lokomotivmannsforbund
- Norsk Pensjonistforbund
- Norwegian Civil Service Union
- Norwegian Transport Workers' Union
- SAFE
- Skolenes Landsforbund
- Tyrilistiftelsen
- Union of Education Norway
- The Welfare Alliance
