= Gerd Kristiansen =

Norwegian licensed practical nurse (born 1955)

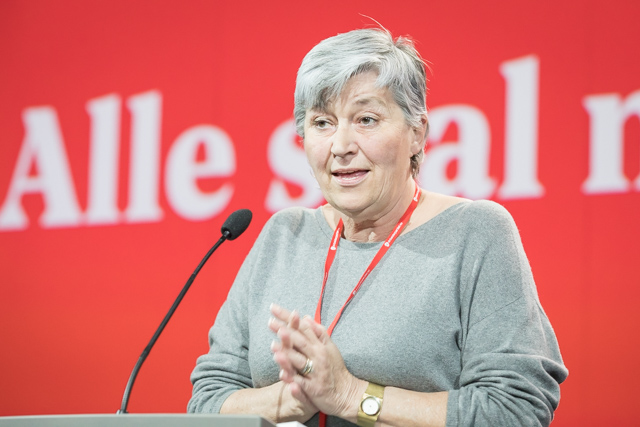
Gerd Kristiansen in 2017

Gerd Kristiansen (born 1 August 1955 in Harstad) is a Norwegian licensed practical nurse. She served as the leader of the Norwegian Confederation of Trade Unions from 2013 to 2017.

== Career ==
Gerd Kristiansen was born in the village of Fauskevåg in Harstad municipality and grew up on a farm. At the age of 17 she became a single mother. She took some courses in economics but also worked as a fisher in the North Sea and the Barents Sea. In the early 1980s she worked on a fishing boat that shipwrecked outside Kiberg, but all on board survived. After studying in Tromsø, she became a licensed practical nurse. She then worked at Åsgard, a psychiatric hospital, which today is part of the University Hospital of North Norway in Tromsø. Early in her career she became involved in trade union work, and held several elected positions. She was the Norwegian Confederation of Trade Union's main representative for members employed in the county of Troms for ten years.

Kristiansen was elected deputy leader of the Norwegian Association of Health and Social Care Personnel in 2002. The organization was merged into Norwegian Union of Municipal and General Employees in 2003 and Kristiansen then became part of the leadership in that organization. She was elected deputy leader of Norwegian Union of Municipal and General Employees in 2005.

At the Confederation of Trade Union's congress in 2009, Gerd Kristiansen was elected deputy leader of the Norwegian Confederation of Trade Unions, with Roar Flåthen as president of the organization. Her candidature was backed and promoted by the Union of Municipal and General Employees, but it came as a surprise to many other delegates at the Confederation congress, as they believed that Rita Lekang, who already was in the Confederation's leadership, would have been their candidate.

Before and during the Confederation of Trade Union's congress in May 2013 there was a contest between Gerd Kristiansen and the other deputy leader Tor-Arne Solbakken for the leadership position of the organization after Roar Flåthen retired due to age. Both candidates had backgrounds in the public sector, and there were no known major political differences between them. On 5 May, Kristiansen made it clear to the election committee that she would only accept the leadership position and would not consider continuing as deputy leader. At the same time her branch of the Norwegian Union of Municipal and General Employees stated that they would not propose any other candidates for any leadership positions in the confederation. This meant that if Kristiansen was not elected leader, the confederation's largest branch, which has about one-third of all the confederation's members, would not have been represented in the leadership at all. The other candidate, Solbakken, withdrew his candidature the same day, and the election committee unanimously nominated Gerd Kristiansen for the leadership position. She was subsequently elected new leader with acclamation on 6 May. Solbakken was elected deputy leader.

She is the second female leader of the Norwegian Confederation of Trade Unions after Gerd-Liv Valla.

== Positions and priorities ==
Gerd Kristiansen is in favour of Norway's current European Economic Area agreement with the European Union. She supports making a consequence report about oil drilling in the sea outside Lofoten and Vesterålen; such a report may be the first step in opening the area up for drilling.

Kristiansen has stated that one of the union's priorities is to get a culture for full-time work instead of part-time work in women-dominated workplaces. On 30 May 2013, she criticized women for using the mother role as an excuse for not working full-time. She was strongly criticized for the statement by the Christian Democratic Party and the Progress Party and prime minister Jens Stoltenberg distanced himself from the statement as well.

Other priorities include a focus on full employment, fight against social dumping and a change in the organizational structure of the Confederation of Trade Unions.

== Influence ==
The magazine Kapital named Kristiansen Norway's second most powerful woman in 2013.

== Personal life ==
Gerd Kristiansen is in her second marriage. She has two children of her own and the couple together has five children. She has a home in Harstad and an apartment in Grünerløkka, Oslo. The couple also own a holiday farm near Faro in Portugal.

Kristiansen's lifestyle attracted some media attention after a Verdens Gang interview shortly after she was elected leader of the Worker's Union portrayed her as a heavy smoker and quoted her saying that modern workout was close to hysteria. In July 2013, VG reported that she had quit smoking.

Trade union offices
Preceded by Roar Flåthen	Leader of the Norwegian Confederation of Trade Unions; 2013–2017	Succeeded by Hans-Christian Gabrielsen
