= NFF =

NFF may refer to:

== Festivals ==
- Netherlands Film Festival, a Dutch film festival
- National Folk Festival (disambiguation)
- Nicktoons Film Festival

== Organizations ==
- National Farmers' Federation, a body representing farmers in Australia
- National Fatherland Front, an organization within the People's Democratic Party of Afghanistan
- National Football Foundation, non-profit to develop amateur American football, United States
- Nigeria Football Federation, Nigeria's football governing body
- Norwegian Football Federation, Norway's football governing body
- Norwegian Prison and Probation Officers' Union, the largest correctional services union in Norway

== Other uses ==
- No fault found, used by engineers when responding to written fault reports
