= Kjell Bjørndalen =

Norwegian trade unionist

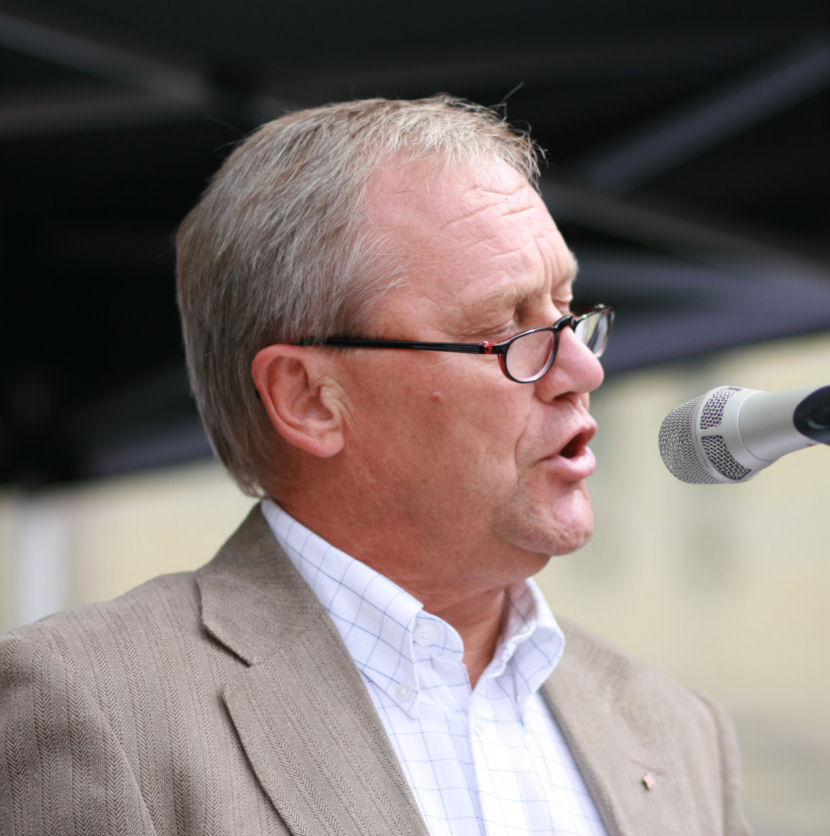
- Born: 23 June 1946 (age 79)
- Occupation: Trade unionist
- Organisation: United Federation of Trade Unions

Kjell Bjørndalen (born 23 June 1946) is a Norwegian trade unionist, a former leader of the United Federation of Trade Unions.

== Career ==
Born on 23 June 1946, Bjørndalen was secretary of the Norwegian Union of Iron and Metalworkers from 1977. He was elected leader of the United Federation of Trade Unions (Norwegian:Fellesforbundet) from 1991 succeeding John Stene. He was leader of the union until 2007, when he was succeeded by Arve Bakke.
