= Hans-Christian Gabrielsen =

Norwegian politician (1967–2021)

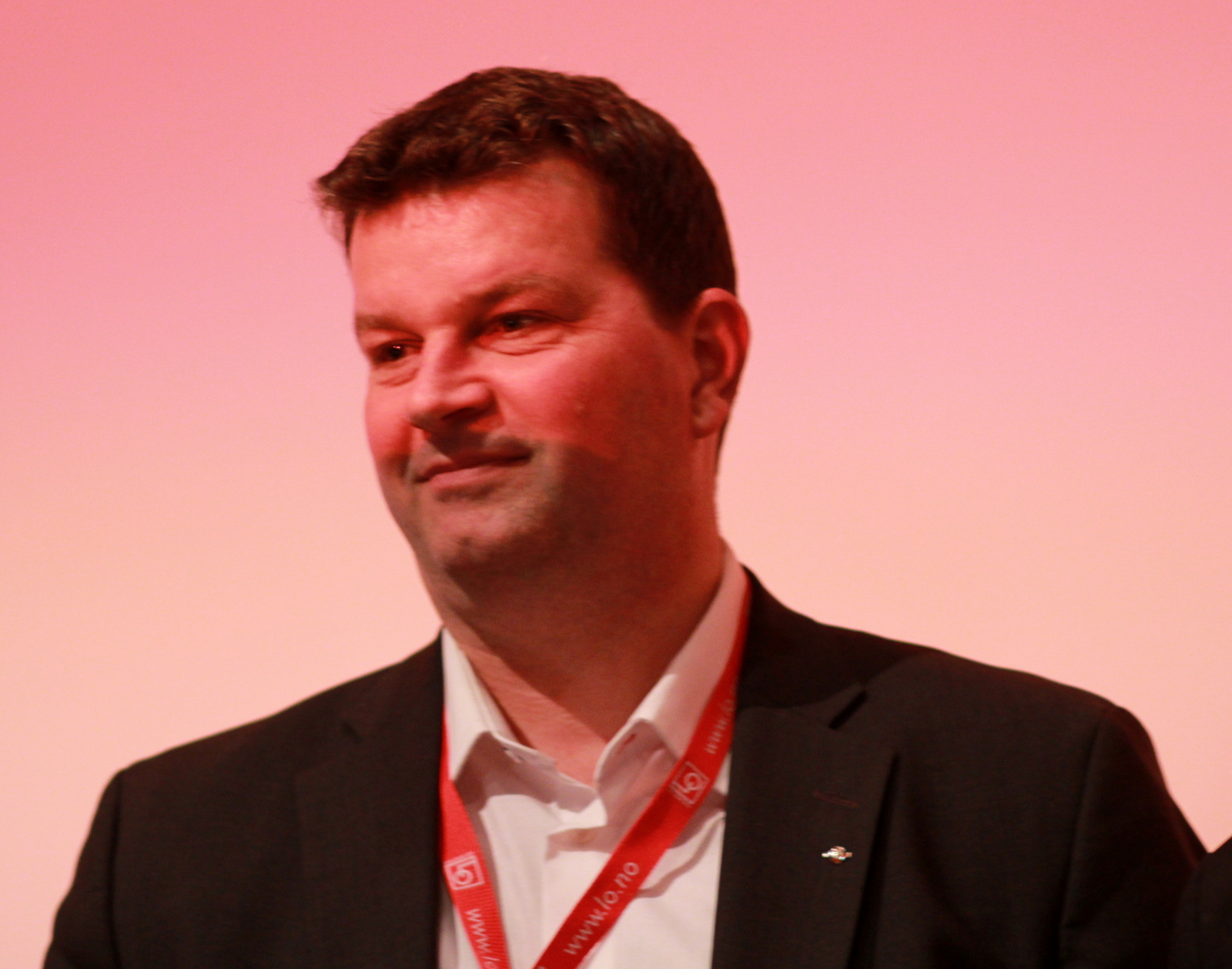

Leader of the Norwegian Confederation of Trade Unions
- In office 11 May 2017 – 9 March 2021
- Preceded by: Gerd Kristiansen
- Succeeded by: Peggy Hessen Følsvik

Personal details
- Born: 27 July 1967 Slemmestad, Buskerud, Norway
- Died: 9 March 2021 (aged 53) Slemmestad, Buskerud, Norway
- Spouse: Trine Gabrielsen
- Children: 1
- Occupation: Industrial worker Trade unionist

Hans-Christian Gabrielsen (27 July 1967 – 9 March 2021) was a Norwegian industrial worker, politician, and trade unionist. He was elected leader of the Norwegian Confederation of Trade Unions from May 2017.

== Career ==
Gabrielsen was born in Slemmestad, in Røyken in the present-day municipality of Asker. He was assigned with the pulp mill Tofte Industrier from 1984 to 1995, and was trained as process operator. From 1996 to 2003 he served as secretary for the United Federation of Trade Unions, and from 2003 had other management roles for the federation. From 2013 he served as second deputy leader of the Norwegian Confederation of Trade Unions, until he was elected leader at the congress in 2017.

Gabrielsen died suddenly in his sleep on 9 March 2021 from heart failure. He was 53 years old.

Trade union offices
Preceded by Gerd Kristiansen	Leader of the Norwegian Confederation of Trade Unions; 2017–2021	Succeeded by Peggy Hessen Følsvik
