= Gunnar Sethil =

Norwegian trade unionist and politician

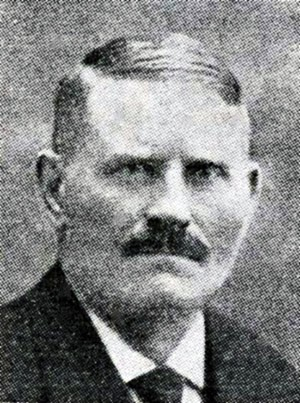
Gunnar Sethil

Gunnar Sethil (28 November 1872 – 20 March 1941) was a Norwegian trade unionist and politician for the Labour Party.

He was born at Sethil in Brandval Municipality as a son of crofter Martin Olsen Sethil (1827–1891) and Karen Bjerkerod (1834–1918). He graduated from Jønsberg Agricultural School in 1892. In his early career he worked as a forest and construction laborer. From 1902 to 1905 he chaired the local trade union Kristiania Sten- og Cementarbeiderforening. From 1904 to 1906 he was a central board member of the Labour Party; he was also a city council member in Kristiania from 1904 to 1920.

He was a manager in the Norwegian Confederation of Trade Unions from 1906 to 1907, and a member of its secretariat from 1903 to 1920 and 1923 to 1927. He was the deputy chairman of the union Norwegian Union of General Workers from 1908 to 1918, when he stepped down together with chairman Richard Hansen. After 1918, they were a part of the social democratic opposition in the labour movement. Still, he did not leave the Labour Party. He served as a deputy representative to the Parliament of Norway from Grunerløkken during the terms 1916–1918 and 1919–1921.

He chaired the Norwegian Union of Municipal Employees from 1920 to 1935. He died in 1941.
