= Olav Hindahl =

Norwegian trade unionist and politician

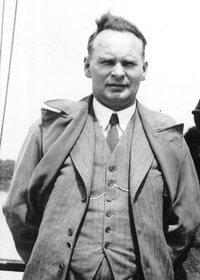
Olav Hindahl at the International Labour Conference in Geneva, Switzerland, 1935.

Olav Hindahl (17 October 1892, Stavanger – 14 June 1963, Oslo) was a Norwegian trade unionist and politician for the Labour Party.

He started his career as a typographer, and became involved in the local labour union. He rose up the ladder and became leader of the Norwegian Central Union of Book Printers, and then of the Norwegian Confederation of Trade Unions in 1934. He left in 1939 to become Minister of Labour in the cabinet Nygaardsvold. During the German occupation of Norway he also headed, in exile, the Ministry of Trade. He relinquished both posts in 1945, but from 1946 to 1963 he directed the Norwegian Labour Inspection Authority.

On the local level he was a member of Stavanger city council from 1923 to 1925 and Aker municipal council from 1929 to 1931.

Trade union offices
| Preceded by Halvard Olsen | Leader of the Norwegian Confederation of Trade Unions; 1934–1939 | Succeeded by Konrad Nordahl |
Political offices
| Preceded by Johan Nygaardsvold | Norwegian Minister of Labour; 1939–1945 | Succeeded by Johan Strand Johansen |
| Preceded by Anders Frihagen | Norwegian Minister of Trade; 1942–1945 | Succeeded by Sven Nielsen |
Government offices
| Preceded by | Director of the Norwegian Labour Inspection Authority; 1946–1963 | Succeeded by Bjarne Dahlberg |
