= Ormestad =

Ormestad is a Norwegian surname. Notable people with the surname include:

- Even Ormestad (born 1978), Norwegian bassist and producer
- Helmut Ormestad (1913–1993), Norwegian physicist
- Marius Ormestad (1874–1964), Norwegian trade unionist
