= Ullring =

Ullring is a surname. Notable people with the surname include:

- Ernst Ullring (1894–1953), Norwegian naval officer
- Sven Ullring (born 1935), Norwegian engineer
