= Øveraas =

Øveraas is a surname. Notable people with the surname include:

- Eli Sollied Øveraas (born 1949), Norwegian politician
- Harald Øveraas (1927–2014), Norwegian trade unionist
- Jørgen Olsen Øveraas (born 1989), Norwegian footballer
