= Peggy Hessen Følsvik =

Norwegian trade dealer

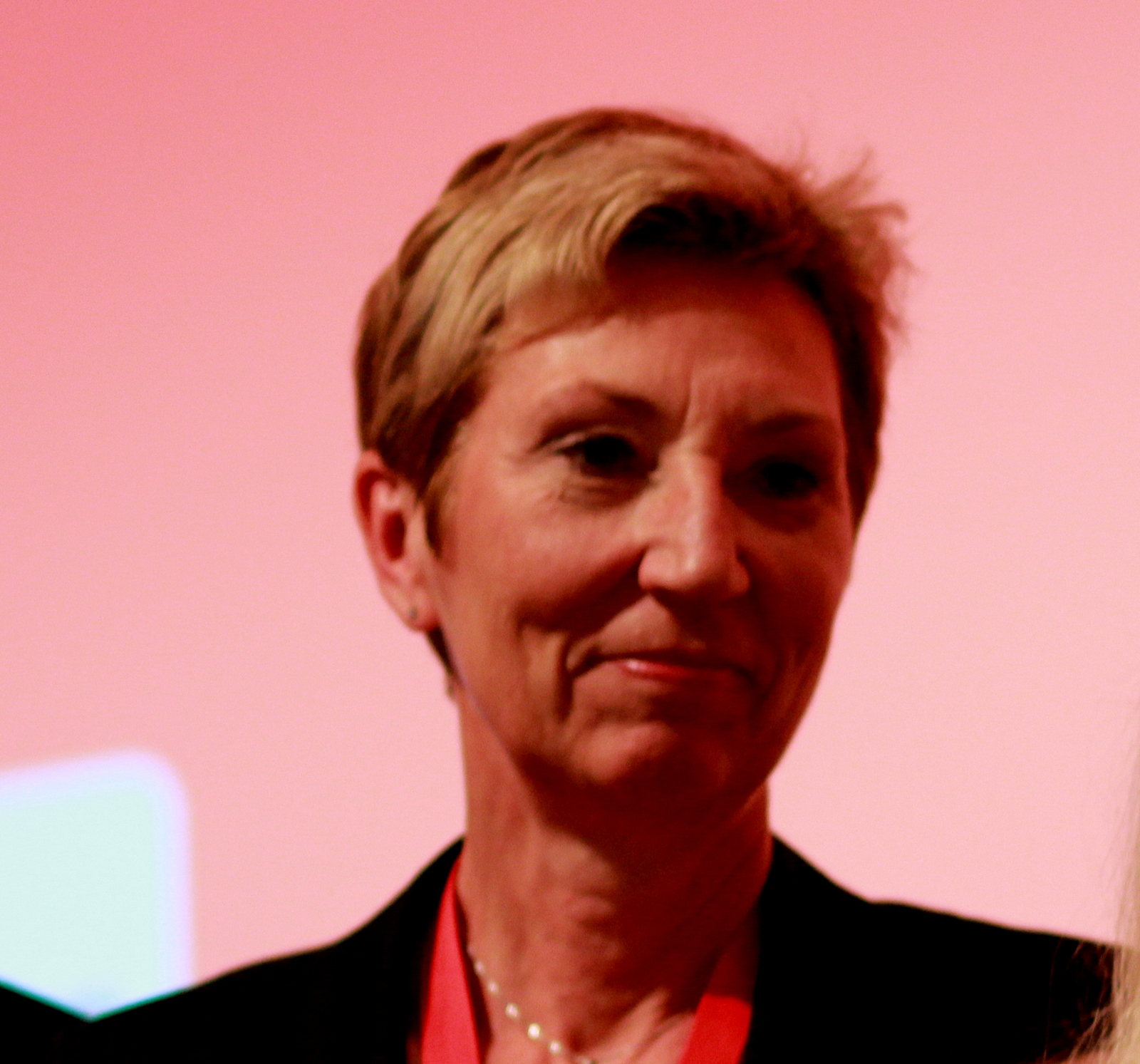

Leader of the Norwegian Confederation of Trade Unions
- In office 9 March 2021 – 8 May 2025
- Preceded by: Hans-Christian Gabrielsen
- Succeeded by: Kine Asper Vistnes

Personal details
- Born: 12 November 1960 (age 65) Vigra, Møre og Romsdal, Norway
- Occupation: Trade unionist

Peggy Hessen Følsvik (born 12 November 1960) is a Norwegian trade unionist.

She was elected first deputy leader of Norwegian Confederation of Trade Unions at the LO congress in 2017. In March 2021, she became the president of the union after the death of Hans-Christian Gabrielsen. She was elected to a term in her own right in June 2022. She didn't seek re-election in 2025, when she was succeeded by Kine Asper Vistnes as the new leader of the confederation.

She previously worked as a flight attendant in Widerøes Flyveselskap and Braathens SAFE where she was elected full-time shop steward in 1998. She was elected deputy head of Trade and Office in Norway in 2004 and was the first secretary of the LO from 2013 to 2017.

Trade union offices
| Preceded by Hans-Christian Gabrielsen | Leader of the Norwegian Confederation of Trade Unions; 2021–2025 | Succeeded by Kine Asper Vistnes |
