= Ole O. Lian =

Norwegian politician

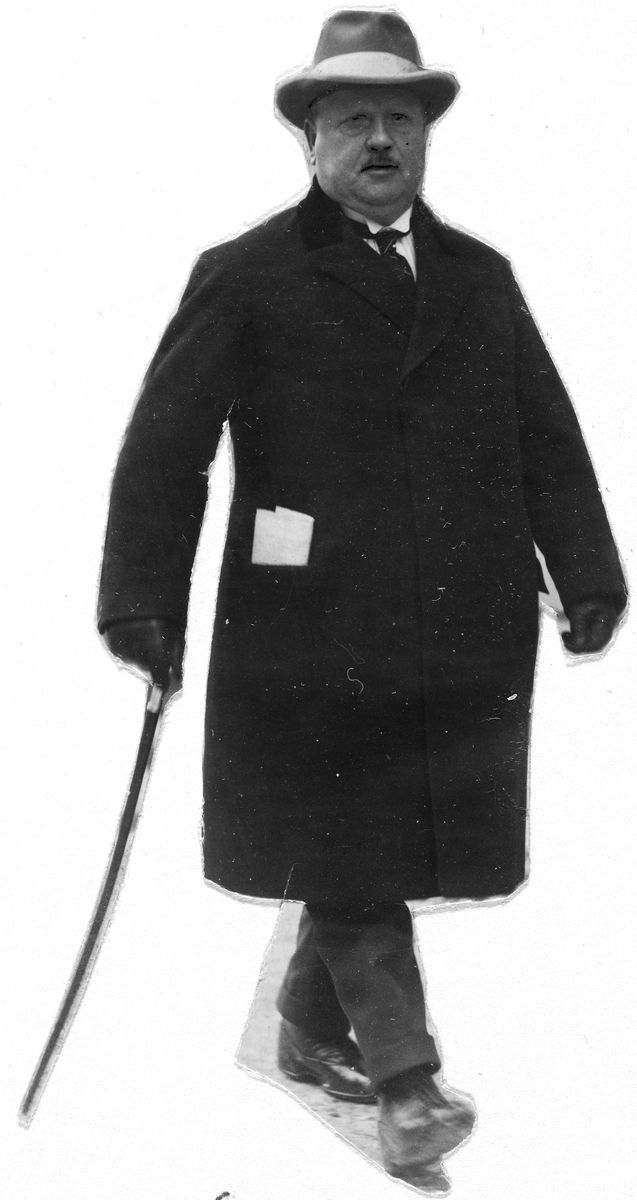
Ole O. Lian

Ole Olsen Lian (10 November 1868 – 20 February 1925) was a Norwegian trade unionist and politician for the Labour Party.

He was born in Tønsberg. In April 1891 in Kristiania he married Elida Josefine Karoline Ellingsen.

He settled in Kristiania in 1889 to work as a typographer after a period at sea. He became active in the Norwegian Central Union of Book Printers, and became chairman in 1903. In 1905 he became deputy chairman of the Norwegian Confederation of Trade Unions, advancing to chairman in 1906. He served as such until his death in 1925.

As a politician he was a member of Kristiania city council from 1908 to 1916, and was elected to the Parliament of Norway in 1915 and 1918. He was the deputy chairman of the Labour Party from 1912 to 1918, and a central board member for as long as he chaired the Confederation of Trade Unions.

Trade union offices
Preceded by Adolf Pedersen	Leader of the Norwegian Confederation of Trade Unions; 1906–1925	Succeeded by Halvard Olsen
