= Kine Asper Vistnes =

Norwegian trade unionist

Leader of the Norwegian Confederation of Trade Unions
- Incumbent
- Assumed office 8 May 2025
- Preceded by: Peggy Hessen Følsvik

Personal details
- Born: 11 January 1977 (age 49)
- Occupation: Trade unionist

Kine Asper Vistnes (born 11 January 1977) is a Norwegian trade unionist. She has served as president of the Norwegian Confederation of Trade Unions since 2025.

From 2022 to 2025 she was deputy leader of the United Federation of Trade Unions.

== Career ==
Vistnes hails from Akershus. She worked at the Nexans cable factory in Langhus, and became active in her local trade union, the United Federation of Trade Unions (in Norwegian Fellesforbundet). She was elected secretary for the union in 2013, and when she advanced to deputy leader in 2022, she was the first female to hold that position.

In 2025 she was listed as one of the two candidates (along with Frode Alfheim) for becoming new president of the Norwegian Confederation of Trade Unions after Peggy Hessen Følsvik. In May 2025 she was elected the new leader of the confederation.

Trade union offices
Preceded by Peggy Hessen Følsvik	Leader of the Norwegian Confederation of Trade Unions; 2025–present	Incumbent
