= Ingvald B. Aase =

Norwegian trade unionist and politician (1882–1948)

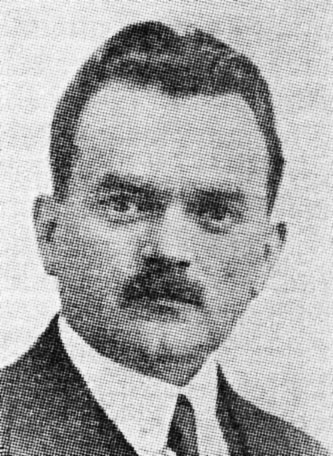

member of the Parliament of Norway
- In office 1922–1930

Personal details
- Born: 5 February 1882; Bergen
- Died: 23 May 1948
- Political party: Labour; Communist
- Occupation: trade unionist

Ingvald Berentin Aase (5 February 1882 – 23 May 1948) was a Norwegian trade unionist and politician for the Labour and the Communist parties.

He was born in Bergen as a son of Baste Olsen Aase and Marta Mundal. He had basic education before taking painter training, and he received a craftsman burghership in 1907. He was the manager of the cooperative Bergens Malerverksted from 1914 to 1923. He chaired the union Malersvennenes forening in Bergen from 1912 to 1916, and Bergen faglige samorg in 1917.

He was a member of Bergen city council from 1916 to 1933, from 1919 to 1931 in the executive committee. From 1921 to 1928 he chaired the local branch of his parties. He was elected to the Parliament of Norway from Bergen in 1921, 1924 and 1927. Midway in his first term he changed allegiance from the Labour Party to the Communist Party. Midway in his third term he returned to the Labour Party.

In 1930 he was hired as a secretary in the Norwegian Union of Building Workers. He became chairman of this union in 1933. From 1934 to his death in 1948 he was the treasurer of the Norwegian Confederation of Trade Unions. He was also a board member of the newspaper Arbeidet.
