= Roar Flåthen =

Norwegian trade unionist and politician

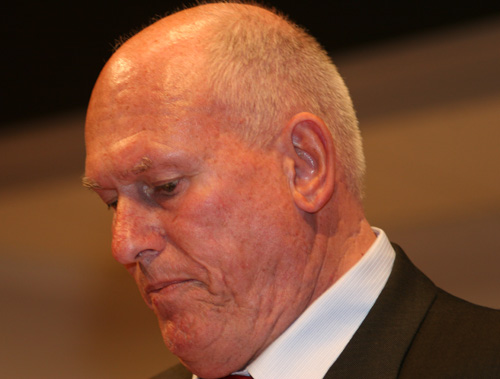
- Flåthen in 2007.

Leader of the Norwegian Confederation of Trade Unions
- In office 17 April 2007 – 6 May 2013
- Preceded by: Gerd-Liv Valla
- Succeeded by: Gerd Kristiansen

Deputy Member of the Norwegian Parliament
- In office 1 October 1985 – 30 September 1989
- Constituency: Buskerud

Personal details
- Born: 15 January 1950 (age 76) Buskerud, Norway
- Party: Labour
- Occupation: Politician

Roar Flåthen (born 15 January 1950) is a Norwegian trade unionist and politician for the Norwegian Labour Party.

He was leader of the Norwegian Confederation of Trade Unions 2007 - 2013. He became the leader after Gerd-Liv Valla resigned on 9 March 2007 in the aftermath of the Valla scandal.

He has also represented the trade union in the National Wages Board, before becoming the trade union's leader.

As a politician he served as a deputy representative to the Parliament of Norway from Buskerud during the term 1985–1989.

As of 2014 he is a board member of Kongsberg Gruppen.

Trade union offices
Preceded by Gerd-Liv Valla	Leader of the Norwegian Confederation of Trade Unions; 2007–2013	Succeeded by Gerd Kristiansen
