= Norwegian Post Organisation =

Norwegian trade union

- Merged into: Norwegian Union of Postmen
- Formation: 1977
- Dissolved: 2000
- Type: Trade Union

The Norwegian Post Organisation (Norwegian: Den norske Postorganisasjon, DNP) was a trade union representing postal workers in Norway.

The union was founded in 1977, when the National Union of Postal Clerks merged with the Norwegian Union of Postal Officials. It affiliated to the Norwegian Confederation of Trade Unions, and by 1983, it had 13,015 members. This rose to 14,366 in 1996.

In 2000, the union merged with the Norwegian Union of Postmen, to form the Norwegian Post and Communications Union.

== Presidents ==
1977: Gunnar Solvang
1981: Anders Renolen
1985: Arild Øynes
c.1990: Morten Øye
1999: Randi Løvland
