= Tone Rønoldtangen =

Norwegian trade unionist and politician

Tone Rønoldtangen (born 5 August 1953) is a Norwegian trade unionist and politician for the Labour Party.

She was born in Nes in Akershus county where she has chaired the local Labour Party. She also served on the municipal council of Nes Municipality.

She started her career at sea, working in a galley. She later worked as a radio officer after completing the two-year training. She moved home to Opakermoen when she was hired as an accountant for the Royal Norwegian Air Force, working out of Kongsvinger. She later became a full-time trade unionist in the Norwegian Civil Service Union, and was elected as treasurer here in 2006. In 2010 she advanced to the first female leader of LO Stat, where she had been a board member since 1998. She was leader of LO Stat until 2016.

Preceded by Morten Øye	Chair of LO Stat; 2010–2016	Succeeded by ???
