= Rolf Hauge (trade unionist) =

Norwegian politician

Rolf Hauge (14 August 1923 – 28 October 2002) was a Norwegian trade unionist and politician.

He was born in Halden and started working at the local paper factory, Saugbrugsforeningen, following in the footsteps of his father. He would rather work in the factory's workshop, and was hired here in 1947. He joined the union Håndverksarbeidernes Forening. He was promoted to chairman here in 1957, and was also elected to Berg municipal council.

In 1951 he was elected to the control committee of the Norwegian Union of Paper Industry Workers, as he attended his first national convention. He served as secretary from 1963, deputy chairman from 1967 and chairman from 1975 to 1988. The Norwegian Union of Paper Industry Workers then merged with others to form the United Federation of Trade Unions; Hauge was instrumental in this merger.

He died in October 2002 and was buried in Os in Halden.
