= Asbjørn Wahl =

Norwegian researcher and author (born 1951)

- Born: 1951 (age 74–75)
- Occupations: Researcher; Author

Asbjørn Wahl (born 1951) is a Norwegian researcher and author.

He is currently the director of the Campaign for the Welfare State, an adviser for the Norwegian Union of Municipal and General Employees, and the Vice President of the Road Transport Workers’ Section of the International Transport Workers' Federation.

Notable publications include The Rise and Fall of the Welfare State, released November 2011.
