= Rolf Hauge =

Rolv Hauge may refer to:

- Rolf Hauge (army officer) (1915–1989), Norwegian army officer
- Rolf Hauge (trade unionist) (1923–2002), Norwegian trade unionist
