= Jørn Eggum =

Norwegian trade unionist

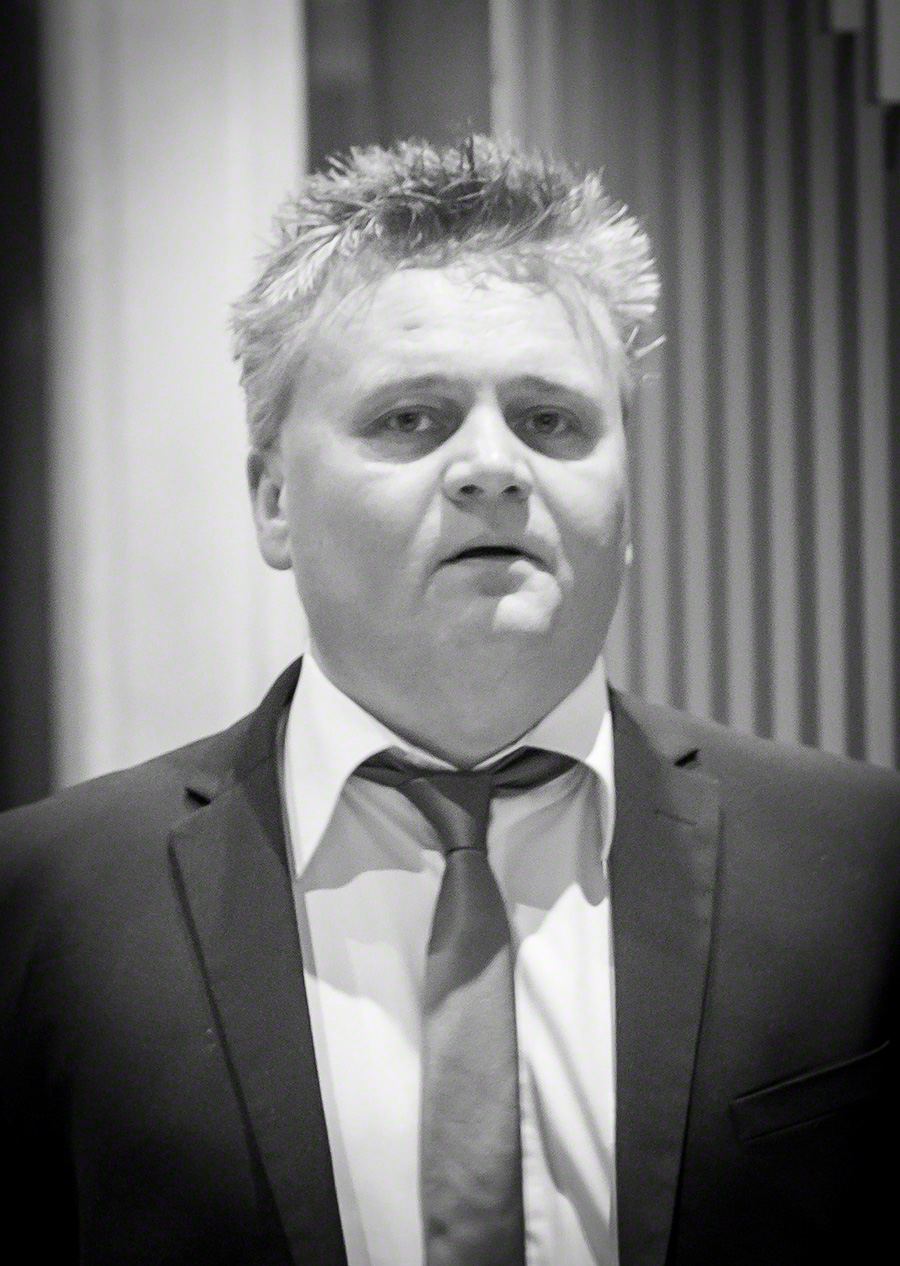
- Born: 5 May 1972 (age 54); Bergen, Norway
- Occupations: Goldsmith; Trade unionist
- Organisation: United Federation of Trade Unions

Jørn Eggum (born 5 May 1972) is a Norwegian goldsmith and trade unionist. He was leader of the United Federation of Trade Unions from 2015 to 2025.

== Career ==
Born in Bergen on 5 May 1972, Eggum was educated as goldsmith, and worked for the company Br. Lohne Sølvvarefabrikk from 1989 to 2004. He was elected vice chair of the Bergen chapter of the United Federation of Trade Unions in 2004, and subsequently held various administrative positions in the union.

In 2015 he was elected leader of the United Federation of Trade Unions (in Norwegian Fellesforbundet), succeeding Arve Bakke. He was reelected for another four years in 2019, and for further four years in 2023. He resigned his position and as a member of the board of the Labour Party in June 2025 following revelations of an inappropriate sexual relationship with another member of the union.
