= Halvard Olsen =

Norwegian politician and trade Union leader

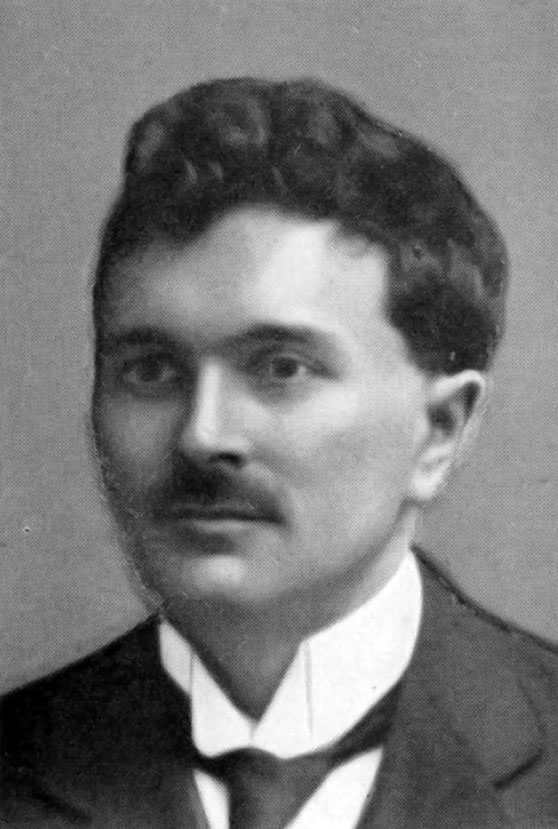
- Born: 23 January 1886; Kvæfjord, Norway
- Died: 5 August 1966 (aged 80)
- Occupations: politician and trade unionist

Halvard Olsen (23 January 1886 – 5 August 1966) was a Norwegian politician and trade Union leader.

Olsen was born in Kvæfjord Municipality. He chaired the Norwegian Union of Iron and Metal Workers from 1919, and then the Norwegian Confederation of Trade Unions from 1925 to 1934.

He was also deputy chairman of the Communist Party of Norway and the first holders of this post.

During the German occupation of Norway he became a collaborator with Nasjonal Samling and the occupants. In 1946, he was sentenced to forced labour, but pardoned in 1950.

Trade union offices
Preceded by Ole O. Lian	Leader of the Norwegian Confederation of Trade Unions; 1925–1934	Succeeded by Olav Hindahl
