= Sverre Iversen =

Norwegian trade unionist, civil servant and politician

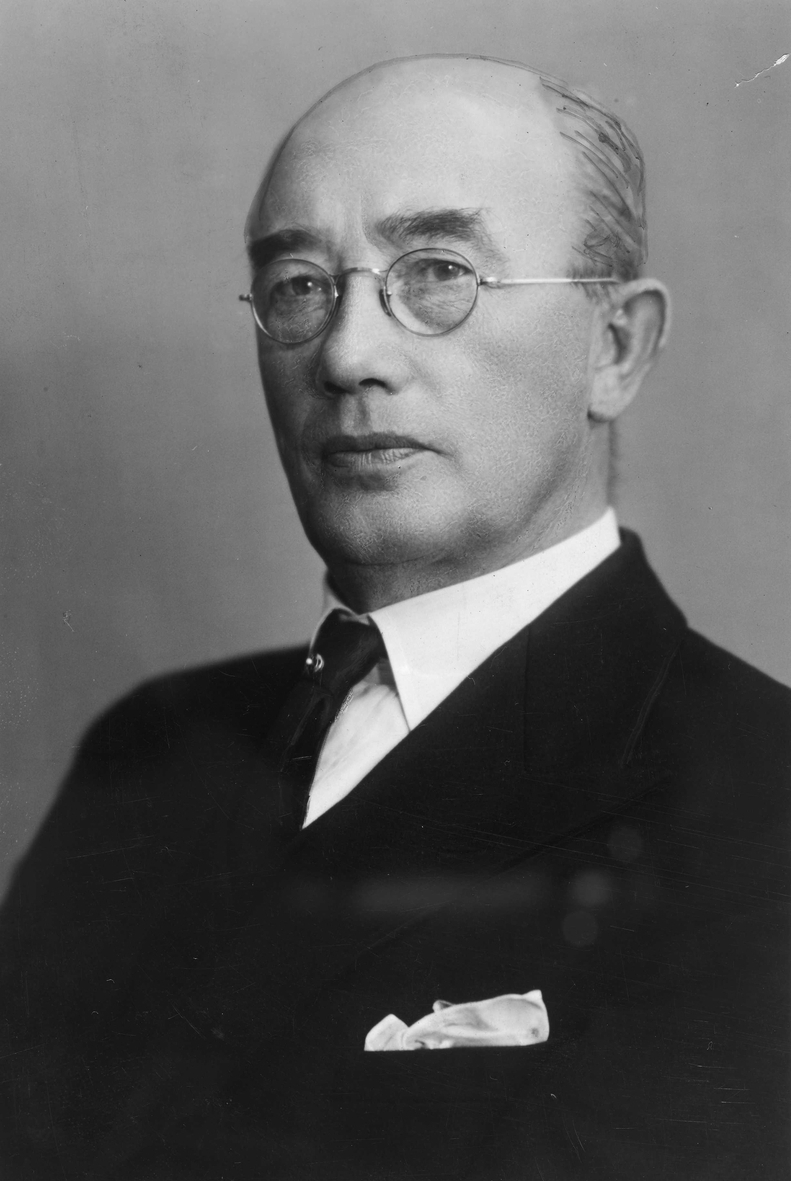

Director of the Norwegian Directorate of Labour
- In office 1945–1950

Personal details
- Born: 6 November 1879 Kristiania
- Died: 20 October 1967 (aged 87)
- Party: Labour and Social Democratic Labour

Sverre Johan Iversen (6 November 1879 – 20 October 1967) was a Norwegian trade unionist, civil servant and politician for the Labour and Social Democratic Labour parties.

He was born in Kristiania as a son of mason Gustav Wilhelm Iversen and Augusta Josefine Andersen. He attended the Royal School of Drawing from 1897 to 1898, but became a mason's apprentice after his father died. At the same time he had higher ambitions. To work his way upwards in society, he studied economics on his own, took voice classes from an actress to be a better orator, and was active in his trade union. He joined his first trade union in 1898, and the Labour Party in 1899. He chaired the trade unions Murernes Union from 1900 to 1902 and Norwegian Union of Bricklayers. From 1901 to 1903 he worked as a travelling agitator for the Norwegian Confederation of Trade Unions. He chaired Kristiania faglige samorg from 1908 to 1913, and was the deputy leader of the Confederation of Trade Unions from 1908 to 1910, later secretary from 1911 to 1915.

He was a member of the executive committee of Oslo city council from 1908 to 1926, from 1917 to 1919 as deputy mayor under Carl Jeppesen. In the 1912 general election, Iversen was fielded as Labour's deputy candidate in the constituency Gamle Aker, as running mate of Gustav Adolf Lammers Heiberg. The constituency was carried by the Conservative candidate. In the 1915 general election, Iversen was fielded as Labour's deputy candidate in the constituency Gamle Aker, as running mate of Per Kviberg. The constituency was again carried by the conservatives. In the 1921 general election, Iversen was the fifth ballot candidate for his new party, the Social Democratic Labour Party. He was the sixth candidate in 1924. He was a member of the Social Democratic Labour Party until 1927, when the party reunited with Labour.

He was also a member of Riksmålsvernet. Iversen was also chairman of Oslo Gassverk, Brenselscentralen and Folketeatret, and was a member of the Labour Court of Norway from 1916 to 1927 and a board member of the Norwegian Refugee Council. He was also a member of the Sports Committee of 1935, which prepared a merger between the sports confederations in Norway.

From 1915 to 1941 he had his daytime job in the municipal administration of Oslo; he was fired because of the occupation of Norway by Nazi Germany and was then a member of the leading resistance circle Kretsen/Hjemmefrontens Ledelse. On 8 May 1945, when the Quisling regime ceased to function, Iversen was named as one of eight Chief Officers in the Government Ministries, and was acting Chief of the Ministry of Social Affairs. His tenure ended on 14 May, whereupon he became an adviser for the Minister of Social Affairs until July. He was then appointed as the first director of the Norwegian Directorate of Labour, where he remained until 1950.

He was decorated as a Commander of the Order of St. Olav in 1949, and the Medal of St. Hallvard in 1956. He died in October 1967 in Oslo.

Civic offices
| Preceded by position created | Director of the Norwegian Directorate of Labour; 1945–1950 | Succeeded by Gunnar Bråthen |
