= Liv Nilsson =

Norwegian trade unionist and politician

Liv Solbjørg Nilsson (28 January 1943 – 4 July 1994) was a Norwegian trade unionist and politician for the Labour Party.

By vocation, she was an office clerk at Bodø Hospital. She was elected as leader of the Norwegian Union of Municipal Employees in Nordland, later advancing to the national leadership. In 1982, she was elected as leader-designate, as it was known that the current leader would retire in 1985. She chaired the Union of Municipal Employees from 1985 to her death in 1994. During her reign, the union reached the milestone of 200,000 members. She was also a member of the municipal council of Bodø Municipality, from 1985 to her death a secretariat member of the Norwegian Confederation of Trade Unions, and from 1985 to 1992 a central board member of the Labour Party.

She struggled with cancer since 1987 and died at the Norwegian Radium Hospital in July 1994. She was buried in Bodø.

Trade union offices
Preceded by Torger Oxholm	Leader of the Norwegian Union of Municipal Employees; 1985–1994	Succeeded by Jan Davidsen
