= Norwegian Union of Clothing Workers =

Trade union in Norway

The Norwegian Union of Clothing Workers (Norwegian: Norsk Bekledningsarbeiderforbund, BAF) was a trade union in Norway, organized under the national Norwegian Confederation of Trade Unions.

It was founded in 1892 as the Norwegian Tailors' Union (Norsk Skredderforbund) and changed its name to Norsk Bekledningsarbeiderforbund in 1931. It was affiliated to the Norwegian Confederation of Trade Unions.

By 1968, the union had 12,551 members. The following year, it merged with Norwegian Union of Textile Workers and the Norwegian Union of Shoe Makers, forming the Garment Workers' Union.

== Presidents ==
1892: Hans G. Jensen
1898: L. Rasmussen
1904: Nils Mittet
1915: Baard Lange
1918: H. A. Birkeland
1928: Witalis Andersen
1952: Rudolf Eriksen
