= Norwegian Union of Bricklayers =

Trade union in Norway

The Norwegian Union of Bricklayers (Norwegian: Norsk murerforbund, NMF) was a trade union representing masons in Norway.

The union was founded on 1 May 1900, and soon affiliated to the Norwegian Confederation of Trade Unions. It had 2,354 members by 1923, and 5,023 in 1963.

In 1976, the union merged into the Norwegian Union of Building Industry Workers.

== Presidents ==
1902: Sverre Iversen
1911: Aksel Schultz
1940s: Lorang Kristiansen
