= Norwegian Union of School Employees =

Trade union representing workers in the education sector in Norway

The Norwegian Union of School Employees (Norwegian: Skolenes Landsforbund, SL) is a trade union representing workers in the education sector in Norway, including teachers, headteachers and teaching assistants.

The union was founded in 1982 and affiliated to the Norwegian Confederation of Trade Unions. By 2016, it had 6,500 members, and by 2019, this had increased to 6,948.

== Presidents ==
1982: Sverre Worum
1993: Gro Standnes
2005: Stein Grøtting
2013: Anne Finborud
