= Mette Nord =

Norwegian politician (born 1959)

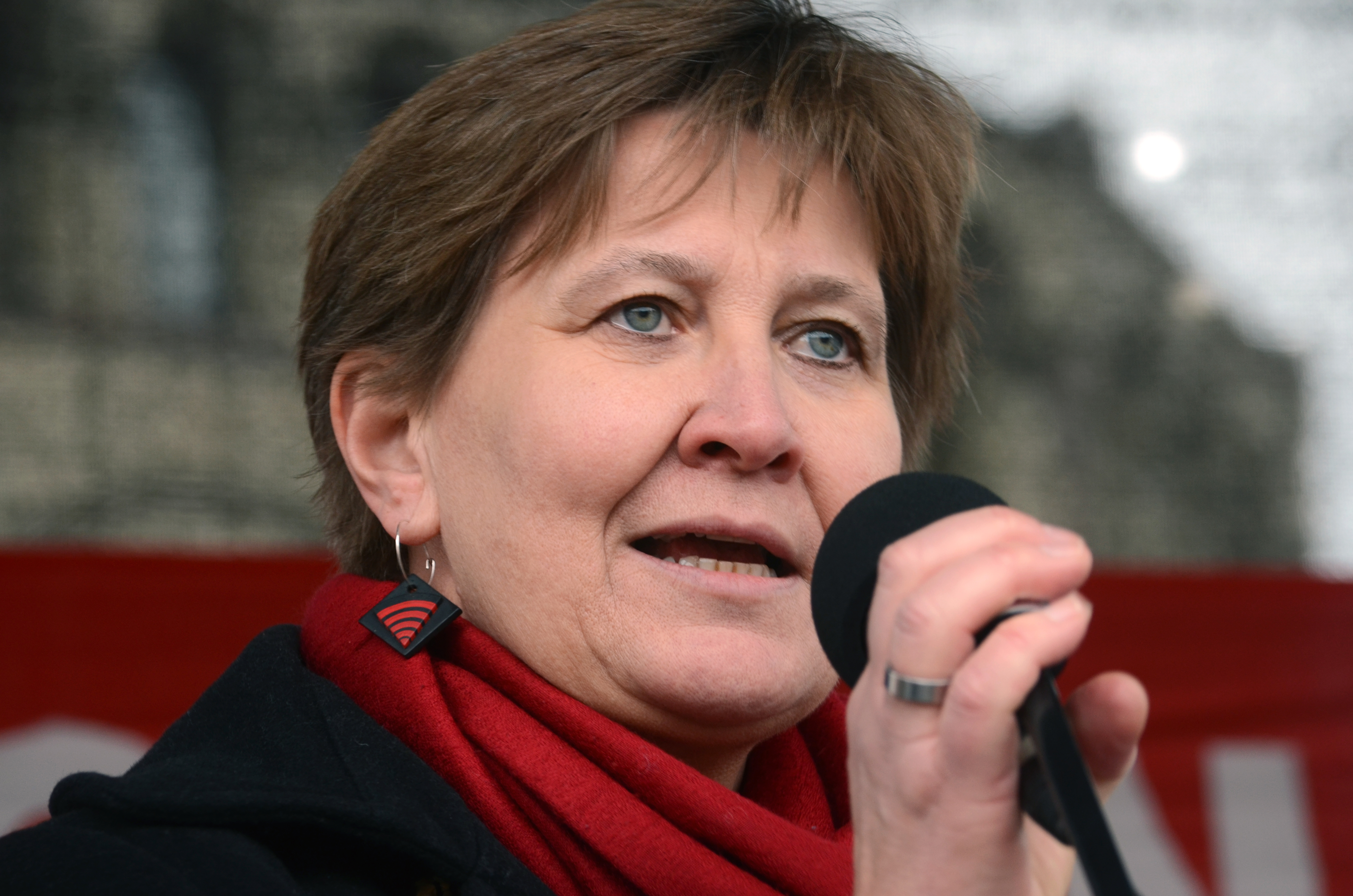
Mette Nord speaking at a rally.

Mette Nord (born 14 January 1959) is a Norwegian trade unionist and politician for the Labour Party.

She hails from Porsgrunn. She is a practical nurse by vocation, and became leader of the Telemark branch of the Norwegian Association of Health and Social Care Personnel. When this trade union merged in 2003 to form the Norwegian Union of Municipal and General Employees, she became deputy leader of the Telemark branch. She was elected national board member in 2005, deputy leader in 2009 and leader in 2013. She stepped down in October 2025. Nord was also president of the European Public Service Union from 2019 to 2024.

She was elected as a deputy representative to the Parliament of Norway from Telemark in 2005 and 2009, serving two terms. From December 2012 to September 2013 she served as a State Secretary in the Office of the Prime Minister as a part of Stoltenberg's Second Cabinet.

Preceded by Jan Davidsen	Leader of the Norwegian Union of Municipal and General Employees; 2013–2025	Succeeded by Helene Skeibrok
