= Norwegian Telecommunication Organisation =

Trade union of Norwegian technicians

Logo of the union

The Norwegian Telecommunication Organisation (Norwegian: Den norske teleorganisasjon, DNTO) was a trade union representing technical staff at Televerket.

The union was founded in 1909 as the National Telegraph Workers' Union. It affiliated to the Norwegian Confederation of Trade Unions, and by 1963, it had 1,638 members. By 1983, it had 4,053 members. In November 1988, it merged with the Norwegian Union of Telecommunication Workers, to form the Norwegian Telecommunication and Data Workers' Union.
