= Norwegian Central Union of Book Printers =

The Norwegian Central Union of Book Printers (Norwegian: Norsk Centralforening for Boktrykkere, FFNB) was a trade union representing typographers and those in related trades in Norway.

The union was founded on 1 October 1882, the first trade union to be formed in Norway. It was initially named the Norwegian Central Travel Fund for Book Printers, but adopted its better-known name in 1885. In 1889, it led a lengthy strike in Oslo, after which it adopted the form of a modern trade union. It later affiliated to the Norwegian Confederation of Trade Unions.

The union had 7,440 members in 1924, but this then declined slightly, to 6,363 in 1963. In 1957, it renamed itself as the Norwegian Union of Typographers. In 1967, it merged with the Norwegian Lithographic and Chemographic Union and the Norwegian Union of Bookbinders and Cardboard Workers, to form the Norwegian Graphical Union.

== Presidents ==
1882: Friedrich Paul Schulze
1888: Olaf Bergenn
1888: Martin Johannesen
1889: Lars Thuesen
1891: Friedrich Paul Schulze
1895: Gottfred Samuelsen
1899: Peder Olsen
1901: Niels Jul-Larsen
1902: Hjalmar Jansen
1903: Ole O. Lian
1905: August Bosse
1907: M. N. Aarstad
1908: Ole O. Lian
1911: Oscar Ruud
1924: Leopold Rungstad
1928: Olav Hindahl
1935: Emil Torkildsen
1962: Roald Halvorsen
