= Norwegian Union of Stone Industry Workers =

Norwegian trade union

The Norwegian Union of Stone Industry Workers (Norwegian: Norsk steinindustriarbeiderforbund) was a trade union representing stonemasons and quarry workers in Norway.

The union was founded on 1 October 1894, as the Norwegian Union of Stonemasons, and soon affiliated to the Norwegian Confederation of Trade Unions. It adopted its final name in 1924, by which time, it had 873 members. Its leader in the run-up to World War II was Henry William Hansen, who was murdered by the Nazis during the war.

By 1955, the union's membership had grown to 1,133. In 1961, it merged into the Norwegian Union of Building Industry Workers.
