= Norwegian Union of Food, Beverage and Allied Workers =

Trade union in Norway

- Norsk Naerings- og Nytelsesmiddelarbeiderforbund
- Abbreviation: NNN
- Founded: 1923; 103 years ago
- Headquarters: Oslo, Norway
- Location: Norway
- Members: 33,000
- Key people: Torbjørn Dahl
- Affiliations: LO
- Website: nnn.no

The Norwegian Union of Food, Beverage and Allied Workers (Norwegian: Norsk Nærings- og Nytelsesmiddelarbeiderforbund, NNN) is a trade union in Norway.

The union was founded in 1923, as a split from the Norwegian Union of General Workers, and it immediately affiliated to the Norwegian Confederation of Trade Unions. The Norwegian Union of Hotel and Restaurant Workers merged into the union in 1927, but this section split away again in 1931, as the Hotel and Restaurant Workers' Union.

In 1962, the union absorbed the Norwegian Bakery and Confectionery Workers' Union and the Norwegian Tobacco Workers' Union. In 1970, the Norwegian Union of Meat Industry Workers also joined. By 1996, it had a membership of 36,374. This has declined slightly, and in 2019, it had 28,254 members.

== Presidents ==
1923: Richard Hansen
1931: Rasmus Rasmussen
1950: Erling Frogner
1965: Åge Petersen
1977: Einar Hysvær
2005: Johnny Hagen
2007: Jan-Egil Pedersen
2019: Berit Aker Hansen
