= Marius Ormestad =

Norwegian trade unionist (1874–1964)

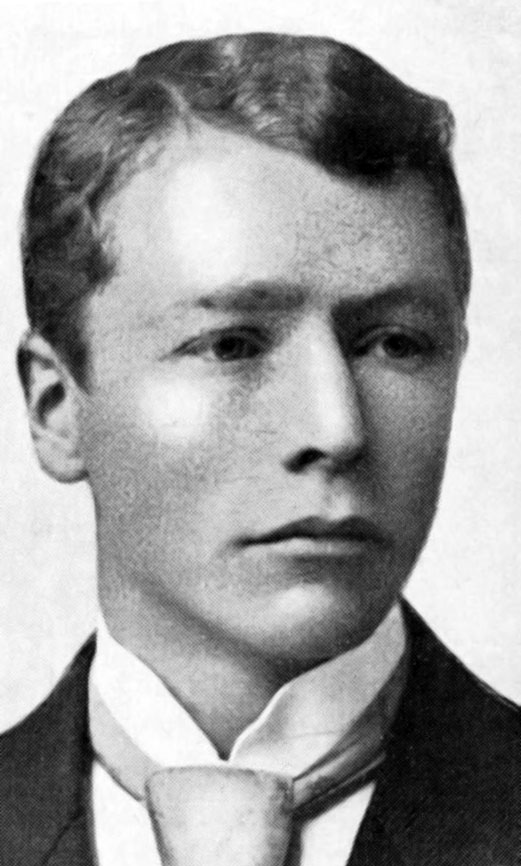
- Born: 13 December 1874; Vaale, Vestfold, Norway
- Died: 28 May 1964 (aged 89); Oslo, Norway
- Occupations: Trade unionist Civil servant

Marius Ormestad (13 December 1874 – 28 May 1964) was a Norwegian trade unionist and civil servant. He chaired the Norwegian Union of Iron and Metalworkers for eleven years, and was director of Oslo Trygdekasse for 33 years.

== Personal life ==
Ingvald Marius Ormestad was born on 13 December 1874 at Vaale Municipality in Vestfold. He was a son of artisan and farmer Johan Christian Ormestad and Hanna Karine Ryg. His father operated as blacksmith and watchmaker, in addition to running a small farm.

Ormestad was married to Marie Kristoffersen from 1898 to 1913, and to Johanne Marie Nannestad from 1913.

== Career ==
An instrument maker, Ormestad started working for the company Elektrisk Bureau (manufacturer of telecommunication equipment) in 1890. Being engaged in trade union activities in Kristiania, he was elected to chairman of the Norwegian Union of Iron and Metalworkers in 1898, and held this position until 1909, when he became secretary in Norwegian Confederation of Trade Unions for a couple of years. He was the first regularly paid leader of the Norwegian Union of Iron and Metalworkers, and thus the first fully professional union leader in Norway. He also edited the trade union magazine Metalarbeideren. A central issue in the early 1900s was the principle of minimum wage for all workers, while the more skilled workers would be allowed to negotiate for higher wages.

Politically he belonged to the Labour Party, of which he was vice chairman from 1903 to 1906. From 1902 to 1907, he served as a representative on Oslo City Council, and from 1905 he sat in the presidency. Ormestad was manager of Oslo Trygdekasse from 1911 to 1944 and was a board member of the National Insurance Administration from 1935 to 1942. He edited the magazine Sykeforsikringsbladet (later renamed Sosial Trygd) from 1912 to 1945. He was decorated Knight, First Class of the Order of St. Olav in 1938, and was Knight of the Order of Vasa and of the Order of Dannebrog.

Ormestad died in Oslo on 28 May 1964.
