= Norwegian Union of Foundry Workers =

Norwegian trade union

The Norwegian Union of Foundry Workers (Norwegian: Norsk Støperiarbeiderforbund) was a trade union representing workers in metal foundries in Norway.

== History ==
The union was founded in 1898, a split from the Norwegian Union of Iron and Metalworkers (NJMF), named the Norwegian Union of Moulders. It was one of only two founding affiliates of the Norwegian Confederation of Trade Unions, in 1899. By 1924, the union had 1,650 members.

The union was in frequent disputes with the NJMF, and in 1948 it resigned from the LO in protest. In 1949, it was a founding affiliate of the International Secretariat of Foundry Workers, and the following year, it changed its name to the "Norwegian Union of Foundry Workers".

The union rejoined LO in 1952, and by 1954 it had 4,151 members. In 1960, it finally merged back into the NJMF.

== Presidents ==
1898: Martin Nygård
1914: Tollef Fjermestad
1916: Ludvig Johansen
1935: Emil Nyhus
1954: Per Andersen
