= International Secretariat of Foundry Workers =

The International Secretariat of Foundry Workers was a global union federation bringing together unions representing workers in metal foundries.

Various unions of foundry workers met at the London International Trade Union Congress of 1888, and the British Friendly Society of Iron Founders (FSIF) proposed that a "Federation of all Iron Moulders' Unions in the World" be established. The proposal was revived in 1891, when the FSIF established links with the Iron Moulders' Society of Victoria, Iron Molders' Union of North America, and International Brotherhood of Machinery Moulders, shortly followed by the Hungarian Trade Union of Ironfounders. The group also corresponded with the Iron and Metal Founders and Their Labourers of Lower Austria, a Swiss union and three other Australian unions, but by the end of 1892, it had ceased to operate.

In 1898, the International Secretariat of Foundry Workers was established. It operated until 1904, when it merged into the International Metalworkers' Federation (IMF).

In 1949, a mixture of opposition to the federation's withdrawal from the World Federation of Trade Unions, and the IMF's refusal to create a sectoral organisation for foundry workers, led six unions to form the International Federation of Foundry Workers (IFF). This consisted of the National Union of Foundry Workers, International Molders and Foundry Workers Union of North America, Norwegian Union of Foundry Workers, Swedish Foundry Workers' Union and two other Scandinavian unions. The unions retained their IMF membership, and in 1951, the IMF organised a foundry workers' sectoral meeting, which agreed to establish a foundry workers' section. The IMF committee vetoed the proposal, arguing that foundry work cut across many areas of the federation's work, and it offered only a consultation among foundry workers about the best way to represent them. Despite this, the IFF dissolved in 1954.
