= Norwegian Graphical Union =

Norwegian trade union

Logo of the union

The Norwegian Graphical Union (Norwegian: Norsk Grafisk Forbund, NGF) was a trade union representing workers in the printing industry and related trades, in Norway.

== History ==
The union was founded in 1967, when the Norwegian Union of Typographers merged with the Norwegian Union of Bookbinders and Cardboard Workers, and the Norwegian Lithographers' and Chemographers' Union. It affiliated to the Norwegian Confederation of Trade Unions. By 1996, it had 14,210 members, and by 2005, it had declined to 12,200, of whom, almost half were retired.

In 2006, the union merged into the United Federation of Trade Unions.

== Presidents ==
1967: Roald Halvorsen
1967: Arne Li
1971: Reidar Langås
1974: Arild Kalvik
1983: Kjell Christoffersen
1991: Finn Erik Thoresen
2001: Roger Andersen
2005: Anders Skattkjær
