= Garment Workers' Union =

Norwegian trade union

Logo of the union

The Garment Workers' Union (Norwegian: Bekledningsarbeiderforbundet, BAF) was a trade union representing workers in the clothing industry in Norway.

== History ==
The union was founded in 1969, when the Norwegian Union of Clothing Workers merged with the Norwegian Union of Textile Workers, and the Norwegian Union of Shoe Makers. Like all its predecessors, it affiliated to the Norwegian Confederation of Trade Unions. It absorbed the Norwegian Union of Hide and Leather Workers in 1973.

By 1987, the union had 12,109 members. The following year, it merged with the Norwegian Union of Forestry and Land Workers, the Norwegian Union of Iron and Metalworkers, the Norwegian Union of Building Industry Workers and the Norwegian Union of Paper Industry Workers to form the United Federation of Trade Unions.

== Presidents ==
1969: Finn Nilsen
