= Norwegian Bakery and Confectionery Workers' Union =

Trade union in Norway

The Norwegian Bakery and Confectionery Workers' Union (Norwegian: Norsk Baker og Konditorforbund, NBKF) was a trade union representing workers in the baking trade in Norway.

The union was founded in 1893, on the initiative of Adolf Bay. It later affiliated to the Norwegian Confederation of Trade Unions. By 1924, it had 1,723 members, and by 1954, this had grown to 3,732. In 1962, it merged into the Norwegian Union of Food, Beverage and Allied Workers.
