= Norwegian Union of Hide and Leather Workers =

Norwegian trade union

The Norwegian Union of Hide and Leather Workers (Norwegian: Norsk Skinn- og Lærarbeiderforbund) was a trade union representing workers in the leather industry in Norway.

The union was founded in 1909, and affiliated to the Norwegian Confederation of Trade Unions. By 1963, it had 1,300 members. On 1 January 1973, it merged into the Garment Workers' Union.

== Presidents ==
1909: Johs. P. Nilsen
1912: M. Westby
1918: Fritjof Hilton
1922: Johs. P. Nilsen
1938: Axel Eriksen
1960: Wiktor Remme
