= Norwegian Union of Shoe Makers =

Norwegian trade union

The Norwegian Union of Shoe Makers (Norwegian: Norsk Skotøyarbeiderforbund) was a trade union representing workers in the shoe manufacturing industry in Norway.

The union was founded in 1890, and affiliated to the Norwegian Confederation of Trade Unions. By 1963, it had 3,833 members. In 1969, it merged with the Norwegian Union of Clothing Workers and the Norwegian Union of Textile Workers, forming the Garment Workers' Union.

== Presidents ==
1890: L. A. Frøitland
1902: M. A. Bakke
1904: A. E. Gundersen
1938: Anton Andresen
1955: Ingvald Hansen
