= Leaders of the Norwegian Confederation of Trade Unions =

Norwegian Confederation of Trade Unions (LO) was founded in 1899, and has had the following leaders:

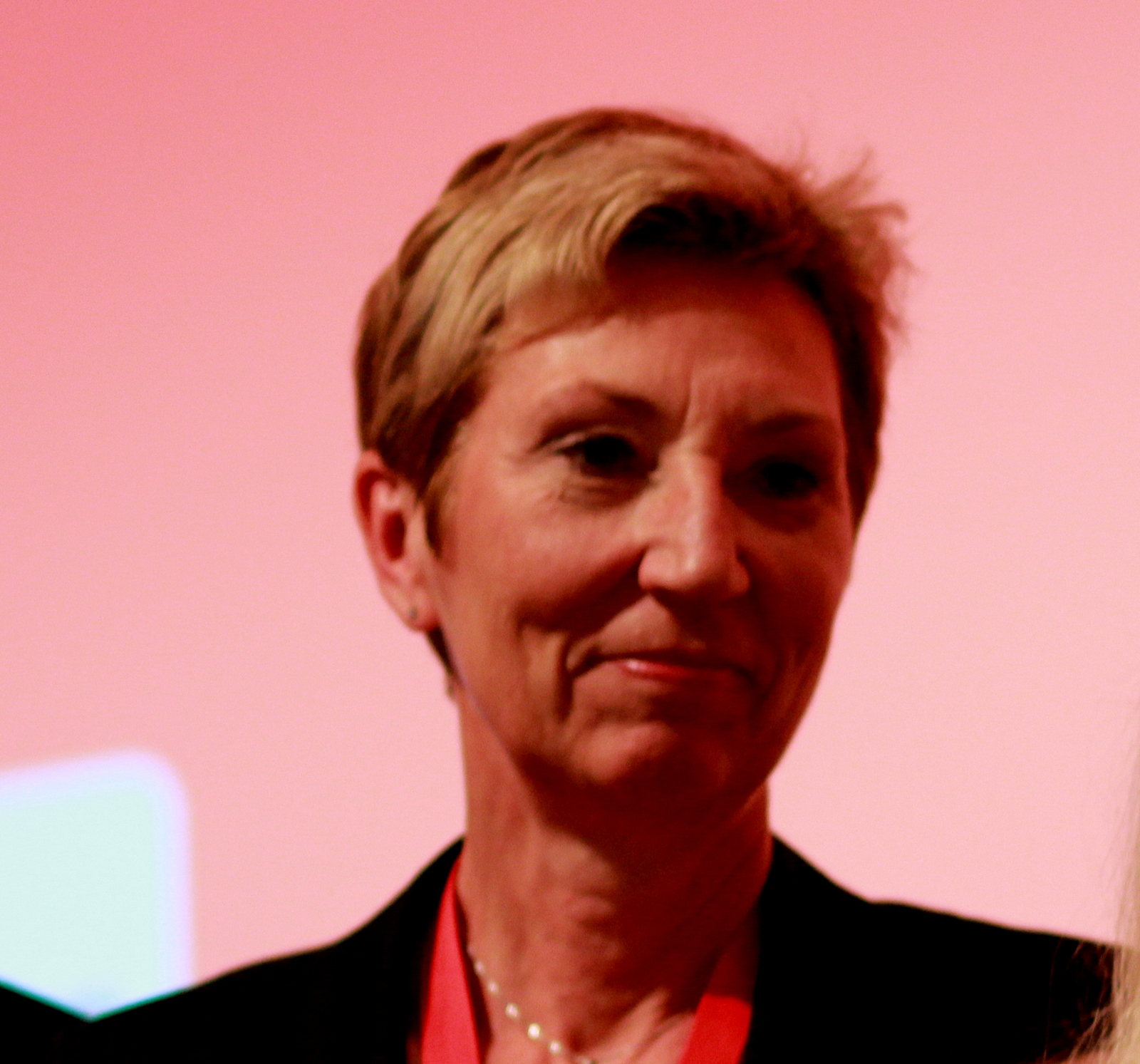
Peggy Hessen Følsvik is leader since 2021, after Hans-Christian Gabrielsen's death

== Leaders ==
- 1899-1900: Hans G. Jensen
- 1900-1901: Dines Jensen
- 1901-1904: Adolf Pedersen
- 1904-1905: Joh. Johansen
- 1905-1906: Adolf Pedersen
- 1906-1925: Ole O. Lian
- 1925-1934: Halvard Olsen
- 1934-1939: Olav Hindahl
- 1939-1965: Konrad Nordahl
- 1965-1969: Parelius Mentsen
- 1969-1977: Tor Aspengren
- 1977-1987: Tor Halvorsen
- 1987-1989: Leif Haraldseth
- 1989-2001: Yngve Haagensen
- 2001-2007: Gerd-Liv Valla
- 2007-2013: Roar Flåthen
- 2013-2017: Gerd Kristiansen
- 2017-2021: Hans-Christian Gabrielsen
- 2021-2025: Peggy Hessen Følsvik
- 2025-inc.: Kine Asper Vistnes

== Leaders during World War II ==
Under World War II, LO was usurped by the Nazis, all other activity was illegal. Leaders of the legal LO were:

- 1940: Elias Volan
- 1940-1941: Jens Tangen
- 1941-1945: Odd Fossum
- 1945: Kåre Rein
