= Norwegian Union of Bookbinders and Cardboard Workers =

Norwegian trade union

The Norwegian Union of Bookbinders and Cardboard Workers (Norwegian: Norsk Bokbinder- og Kartonasjearbeiderforbund, NBKF) was a trade union representing workers involved in bookbinding and manufacturing packaging in Norway.

The union was founded on 1 January 1898, and it affiliated to the Norwegian Confederation of Trade Unions in 1900. By 1924, it had 1,246 members, and by 1963, this had grown to 4,556. In 1930, it adopted its final name. In 1967, it merged with the Norwegian Lithographic and Chemographic Union and the Norwegian Union of Typographers, to form the Norwegian Graphical Union.

== Presidents ==
1899: Harald Jensen
1902: Aug. Gunersen
1906: A. Steinhauser
1911: Lorentz E. Svendsen
1914: Hans Aas
1930: Øistein Marthinsen
1953: Johan M. Bøe
