= Olaf Bergenn =

Norwegian trade unionist

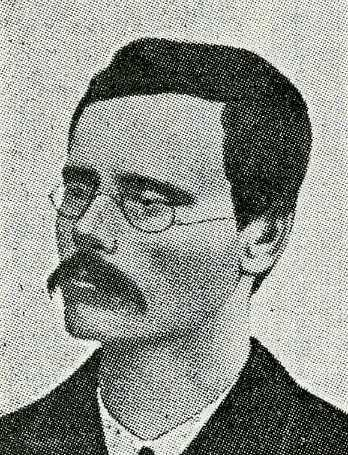

Olaf Bergenn (1 August 1853 – 1896) was a Norwegian trade unionist.

He was born in Søfde Municipality. He worked as a typesetter in Kristiania from 1883. From 1886 he chaired the Norwegian Central Union of Book Printers, Norway's first lasting trade union. He was also its manager from 1888 to 1892, and edited the magazine for Nordic typographers, Nordisk Trykkeritidende, until his death in 1896.
