= Norwegian Telecommunication and Data Workers' Union =

Norwegian trade union

The Norwegian Telecommunication and Data Workers' Union (Norwegian: Tele- og Dataforbundet, TD) was a trade union representing telecommunication and information technology workers in Norway.

The union was founded on 18 November 1988, when the Norwegian Union of Telecommunication Workers merged with the Norwegian Telecommunication Organisation. It affiliated to the Norwegian Confederation of Trade Unions, and by 1996, it had 14,608 members. In 1999, it merged with the Norwegian Union of Electricians and Power Station Officials, to form the Electrician and IT Workers' Union.

== Presidents ==
1988: Tore Lundberg
1990s: Tore Gulbrandsen
