= Norwegian Musicians' Union =

Trade Union

The Norwegian Musicians' Union (Norwegian: Norsk Musikerforbund, NM) was a trade union representing musicians in Norway.

The union was founded in 1911 as the Norwegian Musicians' National Union, and adopted its final name in 1916. In 1919, it affiliated to the Norwegian Confederation of Trade Unions, and although it left in 1922, it rejoined in 1937. By 1963, the union had 1,271 members, and by 1991, this had grown to 2,248.

In 2001, the union merged with the Norwegian Union of Cantors and Organists and the Norwegian Musicians' and Music Teachers' Union, to form Creo.
