= Norwegian Union of Electricians and Power Station Officials =

Norwegian trade union

Logo of the union

The Norwegian Union of Electricians and Power Station Officials (Norwegian: Norsk Elektriker og Kraftstasjonsforbund, NEKF) was a trade union representing workers in jobs relating to electricity, in Norway.

The union was founded on 18 July 1918 as the Norwegian Electricians' Union, and became the NEKF in 1922. It affiliated to the Norwegian Confederation of Trade Unions, and by 1924, it had 1,466 members. This grew to 12,152 members in 1963. On 1 January 1999, it merged with the Norwegian Telecommunication and Data Workers' Union, to form the Electrician and IT Workers' Union.

== Presidents ==
1918: Oskar Marius Haugen
1938: Andreas Torp
1958: Erling Johansen
1970s: Gunnar Grimnes
1990s: Anders Kristoffersen
