= Norwegian Union of Building Industry Workers =

Trade union in Norway (1923–1988)

Logo of the union

The Norwegian Union of Building Industry Workers (Norwegian: Norsk Bygningsindustriarbeiderforbund, NBIAF) was a trade union in Norway, organized under the national Norwegian Confederation of Trade Unions.

It was founded in 1923 as the Norwegian Union of Building Workers (Norwegian: Norsk Bygningsarbeiderforbund). It was a merger between the Norwegian Union of Painters, the Wood Workers' Union of Norway, and relevant sections of the Norwegian Union of General Workers. When it was merged with Norwegian Union of Planing Workers (established 1911) in 1949, it changed its name to the Norwegian Union of Building Industry Workers. In 1961 it absorbed Norwegian Union of Stone Industry Workers (established 1896) and in 1976 it absorbed Norwegian Union of Bricklayers.

Chairmen include Elias Volan (1923–1927), Jens Tangen (1935–1940). Ingvald B. Aase served as secretary in 1930 and became chairman in 1933.

In 1988 it was merged with the Garment Workers' Union, the Norwegian Union of Iron and Metalworkers, the Norwegian Union of Paper Industry Workers and the Norwegian Union of Forestry and Land Workers to form the United Federation of Trade Unions. It had about 63,000 members before the merger.

== Presidents ==
1923: Elias Volan
1927:
1933: Ingvald B. Aase
1935: Jens Tangen
1940:
1949: John Wivegh
1955: Odin Rønbeck
1962: Lage Haugness
1974: Rasmus Solend
1978: Odd Isaksen
