= Norwegian Lithographic and Chemographic Union =

Norwegian trade union

The Norwegian Lithographic and Chemographic Union (Norwegian: Norsk Litograf- og Kjemigrafforbund was a trade union representing printers in Norway.

The union was founded in 1901, as the Norwegian Lithographic Union. It affiliated to the Norwegian Confederation of Trade Unions. In 1911, it absorbed the Chemographic Union, creating a separate section for chemographers in 1919, and adding "Chemographic" to its name in 1937.

The union had only 480 members in 1924, and grew slowly; by 1963, it had 1,837 members. In 1967, it merged with the Norwegian Union of Bookbinders and Cardboard Workers and the Norwegian Union of Typographers, to form the Norwegian Graphical Union.

== Presidents ==
1901: Edv. Christensen
1908: A. P. Nielsen
1909: Hilmar Larsen
1912: Karl Johannesen
1913: K. J. Michelsen
1914: Robert Kopp
1934: Eivind Nilsen
1957: Arne Li
