= Olav Strøm =

Norwegian trade unionist (1866–1963)

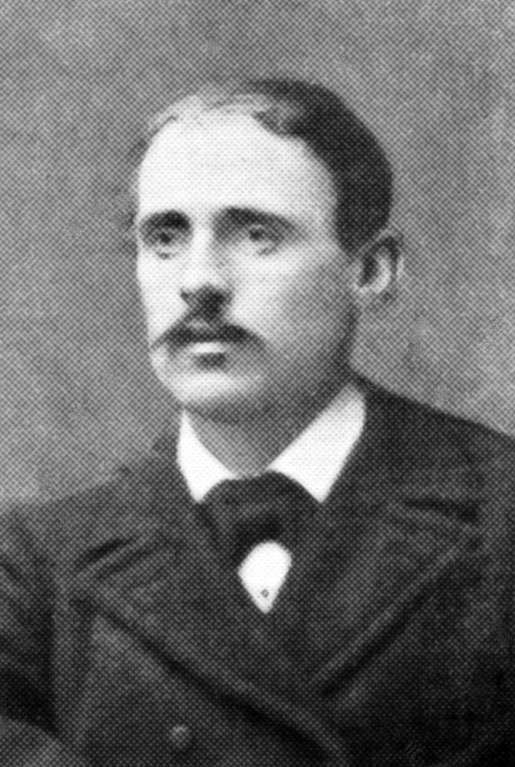
- Olav Strøm.
- Born: 25 September 1866; Grue Municipality, Norway
- Died: 24 August 1963 (aged 96); Kvinesdal Municipality, Norway

Olav Johannes Strøm (born 25 September 1866 in Grue, died 24 August 1963 in Kvinesdal) was a Norwegian trade union leader, and one of the pioneers of trade unions in Norway.

He worked as a young man at a brickyard, and in 1886, founded the first trade union for brickyard workers in Kristiania.

Later in the 1890s, he worked as a construction worker on the new railway to Brevik, and was active in Skien. There, he got the Labour Party and unions to set up their own municipal programme. When they did not get their own candidates on Venstre's list, they set up their own list.

In 1893, together with Sivert Larsen Lunde, he became a member of the Labour Party's social democratic society. At the Labour Party's national meeting in the autumn of that year, Strøm met with representatives of the new associations in the Skien district, and was elected secretary.

As party secretary, he began a comprehensive business as a travelling agitator among rallies and construction workers. In 1895, he stood behind the foundation of the Norwegian Road and Railway Association, which later changed its name to the Norsk Arbeidsmandsforbund. He became the first chairman of the federation.

In 1903, he was reported to the police for defamation against the federation and lost his presidency. Later he lived in Finnmark and Kvinesdal.

He was also later active in party politics, both in the Arbeiderpartiet and the Norges Kommunistiske Parti.

Strøm is portrayed in the novel Dansen gjenom skuggeheimen, where one of the main characters, Ølløv Skjølløgrinn, has a similar life to Strøm.
