= Norwegian Union of Forestry and Land Workers =

Norwegian trade union

Logo of the union

The Norwegian Union of Forestry and Land Workers (Norwegian: Norsk Skog- og Landarbeiderforbund, NSLF) was a trade union in Norway, organized under the national Norwegian Confederation of Trade Unions.

It was founded in 1927 after the Julussa Conflict, and experienced the Randsfjord Conflict from 1930 to 1935. In addition to forestry and farm workers, it organized timber rafters, market gardeners and other rural workers. By 1963, the union had 20,369 members.

In 1988, the union merged with the Garment Workers' Union, the Norwegian Union of Iron and Metalworkers, the Norwegian Union of Building Industry Workers and the Norwegian Union of Paper Industry Workers, to form the United Federation of Trade Unions. It had about 7,200 members before the merger.

== Presidents ==
1927: Johan Ødegård
1931: Peder H. Vestad
1933: Martin Liengen
1937: Alfred Ljøner
1956: Klaus Kjelsrud
1973: Knut Nakken
1981: Svein Morgenlien
1987: Torstein Lund
