= Hotel and Restaurant Workers' Union (Norway) =

Norwegian trade union

Logo of the union

The Hotel and Restaurant Workers' Union (Norwegian: Hotell- og Restaurantarbeiderforbundet, HRAF) was a trade union representing workers in the hospitality industry in Norway.

The union was founded in 1931, as a split from the Norwegian Union of Food, Beverage and Allied Workers. It affiliated to the Norwegian Confederation of Trade Unions. By 1996, the union had 14,569 members, but it was in financial difficulty, and by 2005, membership had fallen to around 10,500. On 1 June 2007, it merged into the United Federation of Trade Unions.
