= Hans O. Felix =

Norwegian trade unionist

Hans Olav Felix (born 25 July 1951) is a Norwegian trade unionist.

A certified electrical fitter, he worked in his field from 1972 to 1987 before becoming a full-time trade unionist. In 2001 he took over as leader of EL & IT Forbundet.
