= Norwegian Union of Child Welfare Educators =

Norwegian trade union

The Norwegian Union of Child Welfare Educators (Norwegian: Norsk barnevernpedagogforbund, NBF) was a trade union in Norway.

The union was founded in 1969, and was initially led by Arthur Lindborn. It campaigned for improved pay and conditions for its members, and also acted as a professional organisation. In 1980, it affiliated to the Norwegian Confederation of Trade Unions, and by 1984, it had 1,104 members.

In 1992, NBF merged with the Norwegian Nurses' Union and the Norwegian Social Workers' Union, to form the Norwegian Union of Social Educators and Social Workers.
