= Bjørgulv Froyn =

Norwegian trade unionist and politician

Bjørgulv Froyn (born 23 September 1945) is a Norwegian trade unionist and politician for the Socialist Left Party and the Norwegian Labour Party.

He was born in Oslo, and took secondary education there. In 1968 he was hired as a worker in Oslo Sporveier in 1968. He was also a member of the Socialist Youth Association (SUF), and became known for participating in the Oslo Sporveier strike in 1970. Then, for the Socialist Left Party he served as a deputy representative to the Parliament of Norway from Oslo during the term 1977–1981. He was also deputy chairman of the party from 1977 to 1979.

In 1988 he joined the Norwegian Labour Party. He chaired the Oslo chapter of the party from 2000 to 2004, and served as an elected member of the Parliament of Norway during the term 2001–2005. He sat on the Standing Committee on Transport and Communications.

Froyn has also had a career as a trade unionist, and chaired the Oslo chapter of the Norwegian Union of Municipal Employees from 1986 to 1994. From 1994 to 2000 he worked as secretary-general of the Council of Nordic Trade Unions.
