= Per Kviberg =

Norwegian educator and politician

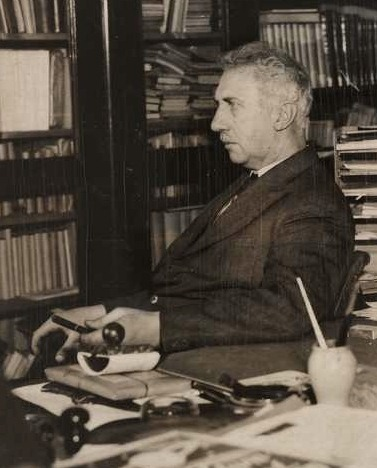
Per Kviberg

Per Olav Kviberg (24 June 1881 – 23 June 1960) was a Norwegian educator and politician for the Labour, Social Democratic Labour and Communist parties.

== Personal life ==
He was born in Borge, Østfold as a son of farmers Hans Ludvig Larsen Kviberg (1849–1917) and Karen Pedersdatter Heia (1848–1929). The family moved to Kristiania when Kviberg was four years old. In 1910 he married teacher Elisabeth Grude (1878–1941), a daughter of Martin Adolf Grude and sister of Karen Grude Koht.

== Career ==
He graduated from Holmestrand Teacher's Seminary in 1902, and returned to Kristiania to work as a teacher. When the evening school Den socialdemokratiske Aftenskole was established in 1909, Kviberg was among the staff, and he became the school manager in 1911. He remained so until 1922. From 1921 to 1950 he was the headmaster at Lilleborg School. He also led the film-based education program in the city from 1921, and issued a publication named Filmen som undervisningsmiddel.

Kviberg joined the Labour Party in 1908, and was a member of the city council from 1909 to 1934. As a teacher by profession, his first publication was the pamphlet on school policy, Folkeskolen i Kristiania, in 1913. In 1915 he issued Kampen om Gamle Aker, as he was fielded as Labour's candidate, with Sverre Iversen as deputy, in the single-member constituency Gamle Aker. He gathered 7,953 votes, but lost to the Conservative candidate Otto Bahr Halvorsen who had 11,458 votes.

In 1921 he joined the new party Social Democratic Labour Party of Norway, a splinter party from Labour. He was the ninth ballot candidate for the party in the 1921 election. From 1924 to 1927 he chaired the city chapter of the Social Democratic Labour Party. He rejoined the Labour Party when the two parties reunited in 1927.

During the Second World War he left his social democratic background, and joined the Communist part of the Norwegian resistance movement. He was arrested, and imprisoned in Grini concentration camp from 30 January 1945 to the war's end. After the war he represented the Communist Party in Oslo city council for two terms; from 1945 to 1951. He also wrote the history of his own school, Lilleborg skole gjennom 50 år 1898–1948. He received the Medal of St. Hallvard in 1956. He died in June 1960 in Oslo.
