= National Union of Postal Clerks =

Postal trade union in Norway

- National Union of Postal Clerks
- Formation: 1909
- Dissolved: 1977
- Type: Trade Union
- Members: 2,524 (1963)

The National Union of Postal Clerks (Norwegian: Poståpnernes Landsforbund, PLF) was a trade union representing workers at sub-post offices in Norway.

The union was founded in 1909, and affiliated to the Norwegian Confederation of Trade Unions in 1954. By 1963, it had 2,524 members. In 1977, it merged with the Norwegian Union of Postal Officials, to form the Norwegian Post Organisation.
