= Jan Davidsen =

Norwegian trade unionist (born 1950)

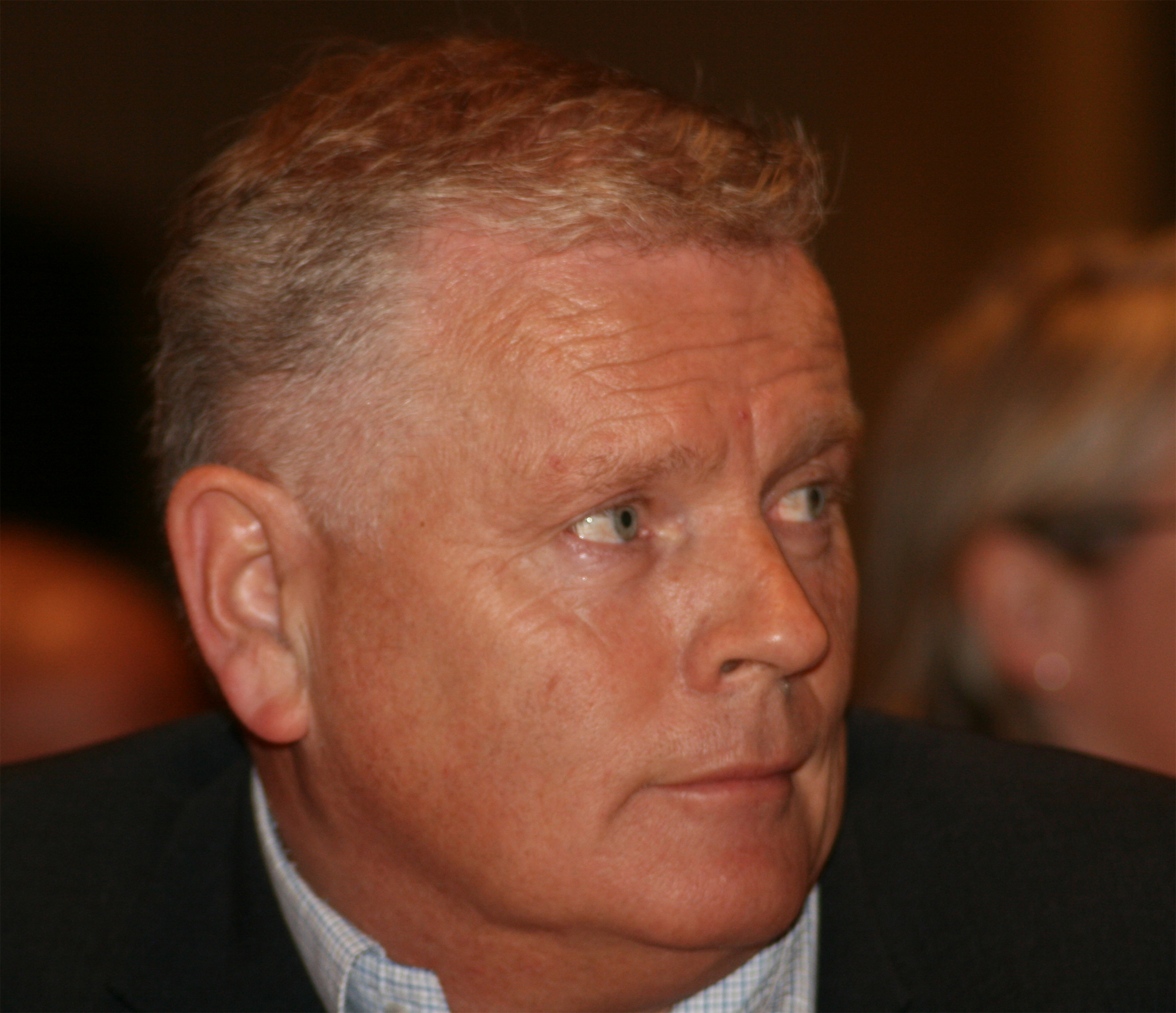
Jan Davidsen, 2009.

Jan Davidsen (born 24 July 1950) is a Norwegian trade unionist.

He is a firefighter by vocation and worked as such in Bergen. He was elected to the leadership in the Norwegian Union of Municipal Employees in 1985, became deputy leader in 1990 and leader in 1994. When this union merged to form the Norwegian Union of Municipal and General Employees in 2003, Davidsen served as leader until 2013. He was also a central board member of the Labour Party and secretariat member of the Norwegian Confederation of Trade Unions.

Preceded by Liv Nilsson	Leader of the Norwegian Union of Municipal Employees; 1994–2003	Succeeded by position abolished
Preceded by position created	Leader of the Norwegian Union of Municipal and General Employees; 2003–2013	Succeeded by Mette Nord
