= Norwegian Union of Telecommunication Workers =

Norwegian trade union

Logo of the union

The Norwegian Union of Telecommunication Workers (Norwegian: Norsk Teletjeneste Forbund, NTTF) was a trade union representing fitters and delivery workers at Televerket.

The union was founded in October 1930, as the Norwegian Telephone and Telegraph Union. It affiliated to the Norwegian Confederation of Trade Unions, and by 1963, it had 8,047 members.

As of 1988, the union had 13,092 members. In November, it merged with the Norwegian Telecommunication Organisation, to form the Norwegian Telecommunication and Data Workers' Union.
