= National Union of Norwegian Locomotivemen =

Norwegian federation of railway worker unions

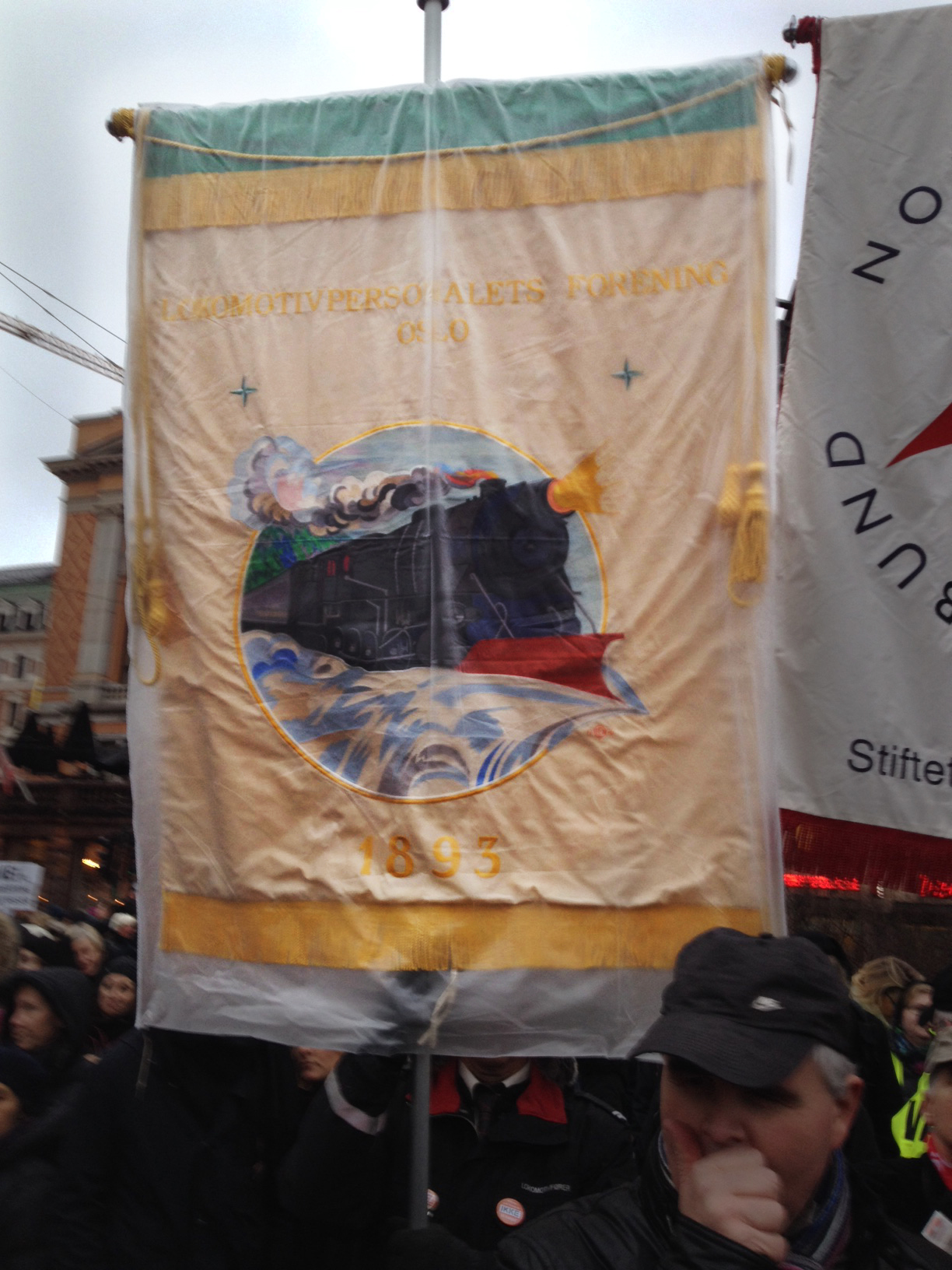
Lokomotivpersonalets Forening Oslo banner 2015, in the rain, covered with plastic

The National Union of Norwegian Locomotivemen (Norwegian: Norsk Lokomotivmannsforbund, NLF) is a trade union representing train drivers in Norway.

== History ==
The union was founded on 22 October 1893 as the Norwegian National Locomotive Personnel Union, and joined the Norwegian Confederation of Trade Unions in 1919. By 1963, the union had 2,049 members, and this has since declined to around 1,700.

== Presidents ==
1893: Karl Andersen
1901: Ludvig O. Bauer
1908: Emil Sandberg
1911: Thorvald Nordahl
1916: Jens Kraft Lund
1919: Sigurd Iversen
1924: Emil Sandberg
1925: Robert Lund
1931: Thorleif Narvestad
1950: Mathias Heggestad
1961: Oluf Andreas Anfinsen
1975: Gunnar Tønder
1989: Oddvar Skaar
1991: Øystein Aslaksen
2011: Rolf Ringdal
