= Norwegian Social Workers' Union =

Norwegian trade union

Logo of the union

The Norwegian Social Workers' Union (Norwegian: Norsk Sosionomforbund, NoSo) was a trade union representing social workers and those in related jobs in Norway.

The union was founded on 1 October 1959, largely by members of the Hospital Curators' Union. In its early years, it focused on maintaining professional standards, but from the 1960s, it focused on pay, education policy, and professional ethics.

The union affiliated to the Norwegian Confederation of Trade Unions (LO) in 1971. In 1977 it elected Bente Wilmar as its leader, the first woman to lead any union affiliated to LO. By 1984, it had 3,944 members.

In 1992, NoSo merged with the Norwegian Nurses' Union and the Norwegian Union of Child Welfare Educators, to form the Norwegian Union of Social Educators and Social Workers.
