= Norwegian Union of Postal Officials =

Norwegian trade union

- Det norske Postmannslag
- Abbreviation: DNP
- Merged into: Norwegian Post Organisation
- Formation: 1884
- Dissolved: 1977
- Type: Trade union
- Headquarters: Norway

The Norwegian Union of Postal Officials (Norwegian: Det norske Postmannslag, DNP) was a trade union representing administrative, district and head post office staff in Norway.

The union was founded in 1884, as the Kristiana Postal Functionaries' Union. It became the DNP in 1893, when it began admitting members nationwide. It affiliated to the Norwegian Confederation of Trade Unions in 1952, and by 1963, it had 3,127 members. In 1977, it merged with the National Union of Postal Clerks, to form the Norwegian Post Organisation.
