= Creo (trade union) =

Norwegian trade union

Creo is a trade union representing workers in the art sector in Norway.

The union was founded on 1 January 2001 as the Musicians' Joint Organisation, when the Norwegian Musicians' Union merged with the Norwegian Union of Cantors and Organists and the Norwegian Musicians' and Music Teachers' Union. It affiliated to the Norwegian Confederation of Trade Unions. In 2002, it incorporated the Norwegian Opera Singers' Union, the Norwegian Prompters' Union, the Norwegian Theatre Inspectors' Association, and the Oslo Ballet Association.

From 2018, the union accepted all workers in the art sector, including performers, artists, teachers and office workers. In light of this, it changed its name to "Creo". By 2019, the union had 9,025 members.

== Presidents ==
2001: Arnfinn Bjerkestrand
2009: Renée Kristin Rasmussen
2013: Hans Ole Rian
