= Norwegian Union of Planing Workers =

Norwegian trade union

The Norwegian Union of Planing Workers (Norwegian: Norsk høvleriarbeiderforbund) was a trade union representing workers in saw mills and related fields in Norway.

The union was founded on 1 September 1911, as the Norwegian Sawmill, Site and Planing Workers' Union, a split from the Norwegian Union of General Workers. It affiliated to the Norwegian Confederation of Trade Unions. By 1924, the union had 3,882 members.

In 1949, the union merged into the Norwegian Union of Building Workers, which renamed itself as the "Norwegian Union of Building Industry Workers".

== Presidents ==
1912: Andreas Juell
1915: Hans Eriksen
1945: John Wivegh
