= Norwegian Nurses' Union =

Norwegian trade union

The Norwegian Nurses' Union (Norwegian: Norsk vernepleierforbund, NVF) was a trade union representing nurses working with people with learning disabilities in Norway.

The union was founded in 1962, and was initially led by Frank Bye. In 1985, it affiliated to the Norwegian Confederation of Trade Unions, and by 1992, it had 2,411 members. Later that year, it merged with the Norwegian Social Workers' Union and the Norwegian Union of Child Welfare Educators, to form the Norwegian Union of Social Educators and Social Workers.
