= Norwegian Union of Gold Workers =

Norwegian trade union

The Norwegian Union of Gold Workers (Norwegian: Norsk gullsmedarbeiderforbund, NGAF) was a trade union representing goldsmiths in Norway.

The union was founded on 31 May 1909, and affiliated to the Norwegian Confederation of Trade Unions. By 1924, it had only 435 members, but by 1963, this had grown to 1,033. By the 1980s, its membership had declined, so on 1 January 1985, it merged into the Norwegian Union of Iron and Metalworkers.

== Presidents ==
1935: Nils Heggland
1948: Hugo Lindahl
1967: Kåre Dahlberg
