= Electrician and IT Workers' Union =

Trade union in Norway

- EL og IT Forbundet
- Forbundet (English: Connected)
- Nickname: EL og IT
- Founded: 1999; 27 years ago
- Type: Trade union
- Headquarters: Oslo
- Location: Norway
- Fields: Electrical industry, information technology
- Members: 42,000 (2022)
- Key people: Geir Ove Kulseth, president
- Affiliations: LO
- Website: www.elogit.no

The Electrician and IT Workers' Union (Norwegian: EL og IT Forbundet, EL og IT) is a trade union in Norway.

The union was formed by the 1999 merger of the Norwegian Union of Electricians and Power Station Workers, and the Norwegian Telecommunication and Data Workers' Union.

EL og IT Forbundet has a membership of over 42,000 and is affiliated with the Norwegian Confederation of Trade Unions (LO).

== Presidents ==
1999: Anders Kristoffersen
2001: Hans O. Felix
2015: Jan Olav Andersen
2019: Jan Olav Andersen
2023: Geir Ove Kulseth
