= Norwegian Union of Postmen =

Norwegian federation of postal worker unions

- Norsk Postforbund
- Formation: 1901
- Dissolved: 2000
- Type: Trade Union

The Norwegian Union of Postmen (Norwegian: Norsk Postforbund, NPF) was a trade union representing mail deliverers in Norway.

The union was founded in 1901, as the National Union of Postmen, when local unions in Drammen, Kristiania and Trondheim merged. It affiliated to the Norwegian Confederation of Trade Unions in 1919, but by 1924 had only 959 members. It grew to 4,426 members in 1963, and 15,929 in 1996.

In 2000, the union merged with the Norwegian Postal Organisation, to form the Norwegian Post and Communications Union.
