= Norwegian Union of Paper Industry Workers =

Norwegian trade union

Logo of the union

The Norwegian Union of Paper Industry Workers (Norwegian: Norsk Papirindustriarbeiderforbund, NPF) was a trade union representing workers involved in manufacturing paper in Norway.

The union was founded in 1913, as a split from the Norwegian Union of General Workers. It affiliated to the Norwegian Confederation of Trade Unions. By 1963, it had 19,088 members, but by 1987, this had fallen to 12,746.

In 1988, the union merged with the Garment Workers' Union, the Norwegian Union of Iron and Metalworkers, the Norwegian Union of Building Industry Workers and the Norwegian Union of Forestry and Land Workers to form the United Federation of Trade Unions.

== Presidents ==
1913: Andreas Bratvold
1938: Edvard Stenklev
1951: Kaare Pehrsen
1967: Olav Bratlie
1975: Rolf Hauge
