= Norwegian Engineers' and Managers' Association =

Norwegian trade union

The Norwegian Engineers' and Managers' Association (Norwegian: Forbundet for Ledelse og Teknikk, FLT) is a trade union representing supervisors and technicians in the private sector in Norway.

The union was founded in 1951, as the Norwegian Association of Supervisors and Technical Officials. It affiliated with the Norwegian Confederation of Trade Unions. By 2019, it had 21,266 members.
