= Norwegian Union of Social Educators and Social Workers =

Norwegian trade union

The Norwegian Union of Social Educators and Social Workers (Norwegian: Fellesorganisasjonen, FO) is a trade union in Norway representing workers in a range of professions relating to social care and education.

The union was founded in 1992, when the Norwegian Nurses' Union merged with the Norwegian Social Workers' Union and the Norwegian Union of Child Welfare Educators. It initially had 8,455 members, and like all its predecessors, it affiliated to the Norwegian Confederation of Trade Unions. By 2019, it had 30,077 members.

== Presidents ==
1992–2002: Oddrun Remvik
2002–2010: Randi Reese
2010–2012: Rigmor Hogstad
2012–2023: Mimmi Kvisvik
2023–: Marianne Solberg
