= Norwegian Prison and Probation Officers' Union =

Norwegian trade union

- Norsk Fengsels- og Friomsorgsforbund
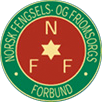
- Abbreviation: NFF
- Founded: 1918; 108 years ago
- Headquarters: Oslo, Norway
- Location: Norway
- Members: 3,500+
- Key people: Asle Aase, president
- Affiliations: LO, LO Stat, Nordic Prison Officers’ Association
- Website: fengselogfriomsorg.no

Norwegian Prison and Probation Officers' Union (Norwegian: Norsk Fengsels- og Friomsorgsforbund, NFF) is the largest union for employees within correctional services in Norway, encompassing both the prison service and the probation service.

The Union was established in 1918 under the name Norsk Fengselstjenestemannsforbund, but the name was changed to the current name when NFF also organized probation officers. NFF has over 3,500 members. There are local elected representatives at the regional level and departments at the jobsites level at each prison and probation office.

NFF joined the Norwegian Confederation of Trade Unions (LO) in 1946. The union is affiliated with LO Stat and Nordiske Fængselsfunktionærers Union, NFU (Nordic Prison Officers’ Association).

NFF publishes the trade union magazine "NFF-magasinet".

== See also ==
- Incarceration in Norway
- Norwegian Correctional Services
