= National Folk Festival =

The National Folk Festival may refer to:

- National Folk Festival (Australia), in Canberra, Australia
- National Folk Festival (United States), touring national folk festival in the United States
