= Norwegian Post and Communications Union =

Trade union for postal workers in Norway

- Norsk Post og Kommunikasjonsforbund
- Abbreviation: POSTKOM
- Merged into: Norwegian Union of Municipal and General Employees
- Founded: 2000
- Dissolved: 1 January 2020
- Headquarters: Oslo, Norway
- Location: Norway
- Members: 16,756 (2019)
- Key people: Odd Christian Øverland, president
- Affiliations: LO
- Website: postkom.org

The Norwegian Post and Communications Union (Norwegian: Norsk Post- og Kommunikasjonsforbund, POSTKOM) was a trade union representing workers in the postal and telecommunication sectors in Norway.

The union was formed in 2000 by the merger of the Norwegian Post Organisation and the Norwegian Union of Postmen. Like both its predecessors, it affiliated to the Norwegian Confederation of Trade Unions (LO).

On 1 January 2020, the union merged into the Norwegian Union of Municipal and General Employees. Throughout its history, the union was led by president Odd Christian Øverland.
