= Harald Øveraas =

Norwegian trade unionist

Harald Eugen Øveraas (16 July 1927 – 9 February 2014) was a Norwegian trade unionist.

He hailed from Velfjord Municipality. He started working on the Nordland Line at the age of 15, and later worked in mines at Svalbard, Malm, and Løkken Verk. His first trade union post came in 1946 at Svalbard. He also worked at two construction sites as well as prison guard.

In 1966 he was hired as an information secretary in the Norwegian Union of General Workers. He was later elected as vice chairman in 1979, advancing to chairman in 1981 after the death of chairman Ole Flesvig. He served until 1991, and then chaired the Norwegian People's Aid for the next eight years.

He was a member of the Communist Party of Norway. He died in February 2014.

Trade union offices
Preceded by Ole Flesvig	Chairman of the Norwegian Union of General Workers; 1981–1991	Succeeded by Arnfinn Nilsen
Preceded by	Chairman of the Norwegian People's Aid; 1991–1999	Succeeded by Reiulf Steen
