= Arve Bakke =

Norwegian politician and trade unionist

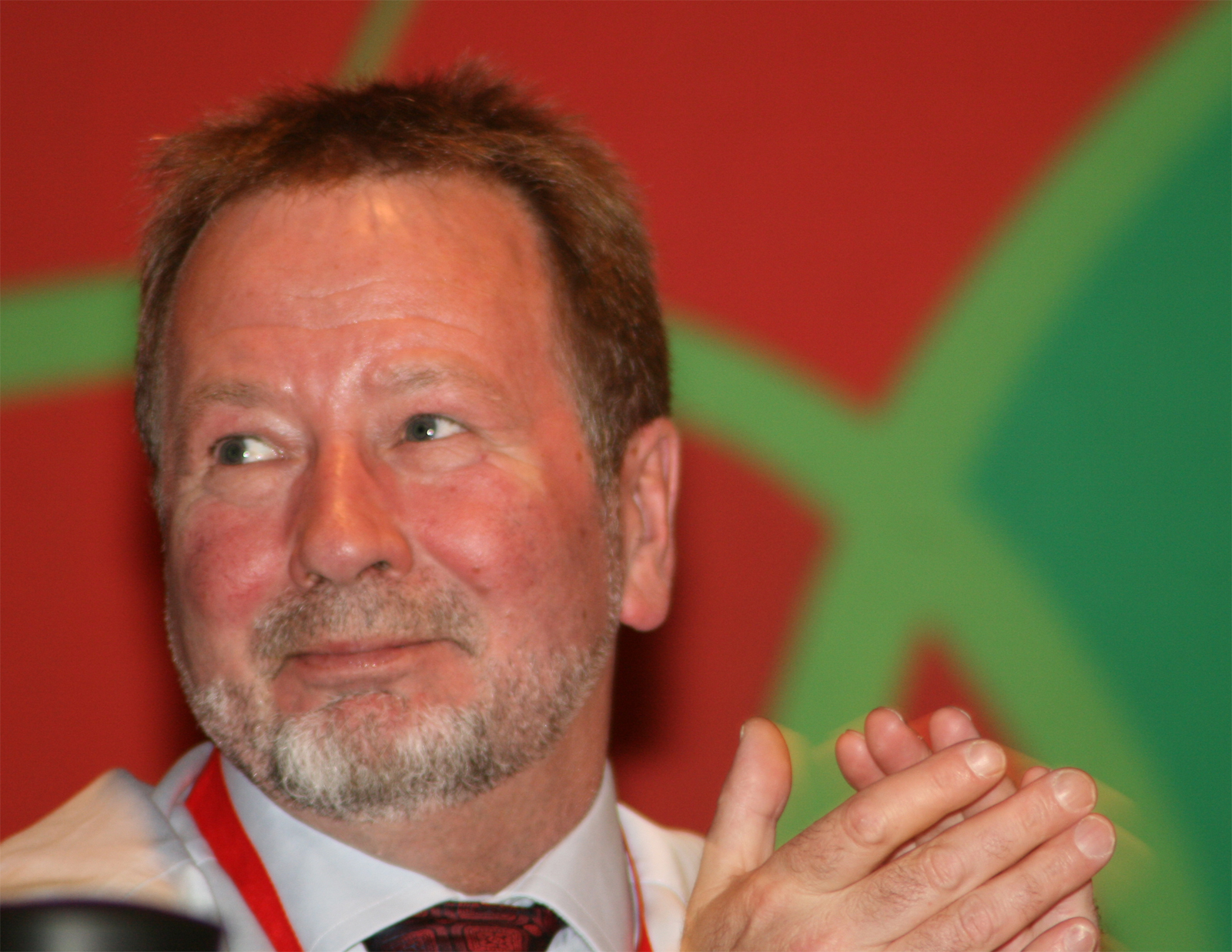
- Born: September 28, 1952; Ulsteinvik, Norway
- Occupation: Trade unionist

Arve Bakke (born 28 September 1952, Ulsteinvik) is the leader of Fellesforbundet.

Bakke succeeded Kjell Bjørndalen as leader of Fellesforbundet in 2007. Previously he was second deputy leader from 2002 to 2003 and first deputy leader from 2003 to 2007.

Bakke worked for more than ten years at the factory of Ulstein Hatlø, where he was an active trade unionist. In 1984 he became district secretary of the Norwegian Union of Iron and Metalworkers. From 1989–2001 he was leader of the Møre og Romsdal Arbeiderparti. From 1996 to 1997 he was state secretary of the Norwegian Ministry of Government Administration and Reform of the Planning and ordnance department.
