= Norwegian Tobacco Workers' Union =

Norwegian trade union

The Norwegian Tobacco Workers' Union (Norwegian: Norsk Tobakkarbeiderforbund, NTF) was a trade union representing workers involved in making cigars, cigarettes and related products in Norway.

The union was founded in 1910, and it affiliated to the Norwegian Confederation of Trade Unions, and also to the International Federation of Tobacco Workers. By 1924, it had 702 members, and by 1954, this had grown to 1,211. In 1962, it merged into the Norwegian Union of Food, Beverage and Allied Workers.
