= Nachrichtentechnische Fachberichte =

- Discipline: Scientific journal
- Language: German

Publication details
- Former name(s): NTG-Fachberichte
- History: 1956–present
- Publisher: VDE-Verlag (Germany)

Standard abbreviations
- ISO 4: Nachrichtentech. Fachber.

Indexing
- CODEN: NTGFDK
- ISSN: 0341-0196
- LCCN: sf87019863
- OCLC no.: 09460033

Nachrichtentechnische Fachberichte (abbreviated NTF) is a German-language technical journal, published by VDE-Verlag since 1956. It has been referred to as "obscure".
