= Norwegian Union of Textile Workers =

Norwegian trade union

The Norwegian Union of Textile Workers (Norwegian: Norsk Tekstilarbeiderforbund, NTF) was a trade union representing workers in the textile industry in Norway.

The union was founded on 1 November 1924, as a split from the Norwegian Union of General Workers. It affiliated to the Norwegian Confederation of Trade Unions. By 1968, it had 8,650 members. The following year, it merged with the Norwegian Union of Clothing Workers and the Norwegian Union of Shoe Makers, forming the Garment Workers' Union.

== Presidents ==
1924: Ingvald Olsen
1945: Alf Andersen
1951: Olav Bruvik
1962: Gulbrand Brauer
1967: Bjarne Baardsen
