= Norwegian Union of Municipal Employees =

Norwegian trade union

Logo of the union

The Norwegian Union of Municipal Employees (Norwegian: Norsk Kommuneforbund, NKF) was a trade union in Norway, organized under the national Norwegian Confederation of Trade Unions.

It was founded in 1920 as the Norwegian Municipal Workers' Union, a split from the Norwegian Union of General Workers. Its chairman the first fifteen years was Gunnar Sethil. On founding, it had 3,280 members, and this grew steadily. The Norwegian Tramway Union merged in during 1921, followed by the National Association of Municipal Officials in 1923, following which, it renamed itself as the NKF.

The Norwegian Fire Brigade Union joined in 1925, followed by the Norwegian Hospital Staff Union in 1931, and the Norwegian Barbers' and Hairdressers' Union in 1937. The union's membership boomed after World War II, and it had 240,000 members in 2000, making it LO's largest affiliate. In 2003, it merged with the Norwegian Association of Health and Social Care Personnel, to create the Norwegian Union of Municipal and General Employees.

== Presidents ==
1920: Gunnar Sethil
1935: Erling Olsen
1945?: Arthur Karlsen
1960s: Torger Oxholm
1985: Liv Nilsson
1993: Jan Davidsen
