= Norwegian Association of Health and Social Care Personnel =

Norwegian trade union

The Norwegian Association of Health and Social Care Personnel (Norwegian: Norsk Helse- og Sosialforbund, NHS) was a trade union representing auxiliary nurses and care workers in Norway.

The union was founded in 1965 as the Norwegian Nursing Auxiliaries' Union. In 1988, it affiliated to the Confederation of Vocational Unions, and by 1996, it had 49,692 members. In 2003, it merged with the Norwegian Union of Municipal Employees, to form the Norwegian Union of Municipal and General Employees.
