= Norwegian Union of Iron and Metalworkers =

Trade union representing workers in the metal industry in Norway

- Norsk Jern- og Metallarbeiderforbund
- Abbreviation: N.J.M.F
- Merged into: Fellesforbundet
- Formation: 1891; 135 years ago
- Dissolved: May 8, 1988; 38 years ago
- Members: 97 998 (1987)
- Affiliations: Norwegian Confederation of Trade Unions

The Norwegian Union of Iron and Metalworkers (Norwegian: Norsk Jern- og Metallarbeiderforbund, NJMF) was a trade union representing workers in the metal industry, workshops, and shipbuilding in Norway.

The union was founded in 1891, and in 1905 it joined the Norwegian Confederation of Trade Unions. In 1907, it came to the country's first collective agreement, with the National Association of Mechanical Workshops. In 1960, the union absorbed the Norwegian Union of Foundry Workers, followed in 1985 by the Norwegian Union of Gold Workers. By 1987, it had 97,998 members.

In 1988, the union merged with the Garment Workers' Union, the Norwegian Union of Building Industry Workers, the Norwegian Union of Paper Industry Workers and the Norwegian Union of Forestry and Land Workers to form the United Federation of Trade Unions.

== Presidents ==
1891: Petter Pettersen
1891: Harald Hansen
1891: Ole Georg Gjøsteen
1892: P. A. Pettersen
1893: E. Lundblad
1895: Emil Pedersen
1896: P. A. Pettersen
1898: Marius Ormestad
1909: Jørgen Borgen
1912: Hans Kristiansen
1913: Aksel Knudsen
1919: Halvard Olsen
1925: Alfred Melgaard
1931: Konrad Nordahl
1934: Josef Larsson
1958: Tor Aspengren
1966: Per Andersen
1970: Leif Skau
1976: Lars Skytøen
1979: Jan Balstad (acting)
1981: Lars Skytøen
1987: John Stene
