= Norwegian Union of General Workers =

Trade union in Norway

- Norsk Arbeidsmandsforbund
- Abbreviation: NAF
- Founded: 1895; 131 years ago
- Headquarters: Oslo, Norway
- Location: Norway
- Members: 33,000
- Key people: Erna Hagensen, president
- Affiliations: LO
- Website: arbeidsmandsforbundet.no

The Norwegian Union of General Workers (Norwegian: Norsk Arbeidsmandsforbund, NAF) is a trade union in Norway. It has a membership of 33,000 and is affiliated with the Norwegian Confederation of Trade Unions (LO).

The union was founded on 13 April 1895, by 12 transport workers, as the Norwegian Road and Railway Union. However, the union decided to accept all unskilled workers, and in 1900 became the NAF.

The union was an early affiliate of the Norwegian Confederation of Trade Unions, and was initially its largest member, with 25,000 members by 1907. However, the federation wished to establish industrial unions, and so numerous industry groups were split out of the NAF as independent unions. The Norwegian Sawmill, Site and Planing Workers' Union was formed in 1911, the Norwegian Union of Paper Industry Workers in 1913, and the Norwegian Union of Municipal Employees in 1920. The process was stepped up in 1923, when the Norwegian Union of Building Industry Workers, Norwegian Union of Chemical Industry Workers, Norwegian Union of Food, Beverage and Allied Workers, and Norwegian Union of Textile Workers were all split out. By 1924, the union had only 5,500 members remaining, mostly in the mining industry and sections of the railway industry. However, it rapidly built up membership in road construction, and by 1939, they formed half of its total membership of 29,000.

By 1996, the union had 32,032 members, of whom 40% worked in the metal industries, 30% in production, 20% in constructions, and the remainder mostly in mining and quarrying, and utilities. Its membership has remained steady, and in 2019 was 34,072.

== Presidents ==
1895: Olav Strøm
1903: Richard Hansen
1918: Elias Volan
1920: Johs. M. P. Ødegaard
1948: Christian Henriksen
1955: Adolf K. Lien
1961: Walter Kristiansen
1966: Paul Sundt
1966: Øystein Larsen
1980: Ole Flesvig
1981: Harald Øveraas
1991: Arnfinn Nilsen
2003: Erna Hagensen
2019: Anita Paula Johansen
2023: Brede Edvardsen
