= Norwegian Civil Service Union =

Trade union in Norway

- Norsk Tjenestemannslag
- Abbreviation: NTL
- Founded: 1 November 1947; 78 years ago
- Headquarters: Oslo, Norway
- Location: Norway
- Members: 50,000
- Key people: Kjersti Barsok, President
- Affiliations: LO, PSI
- Website: ntl.no

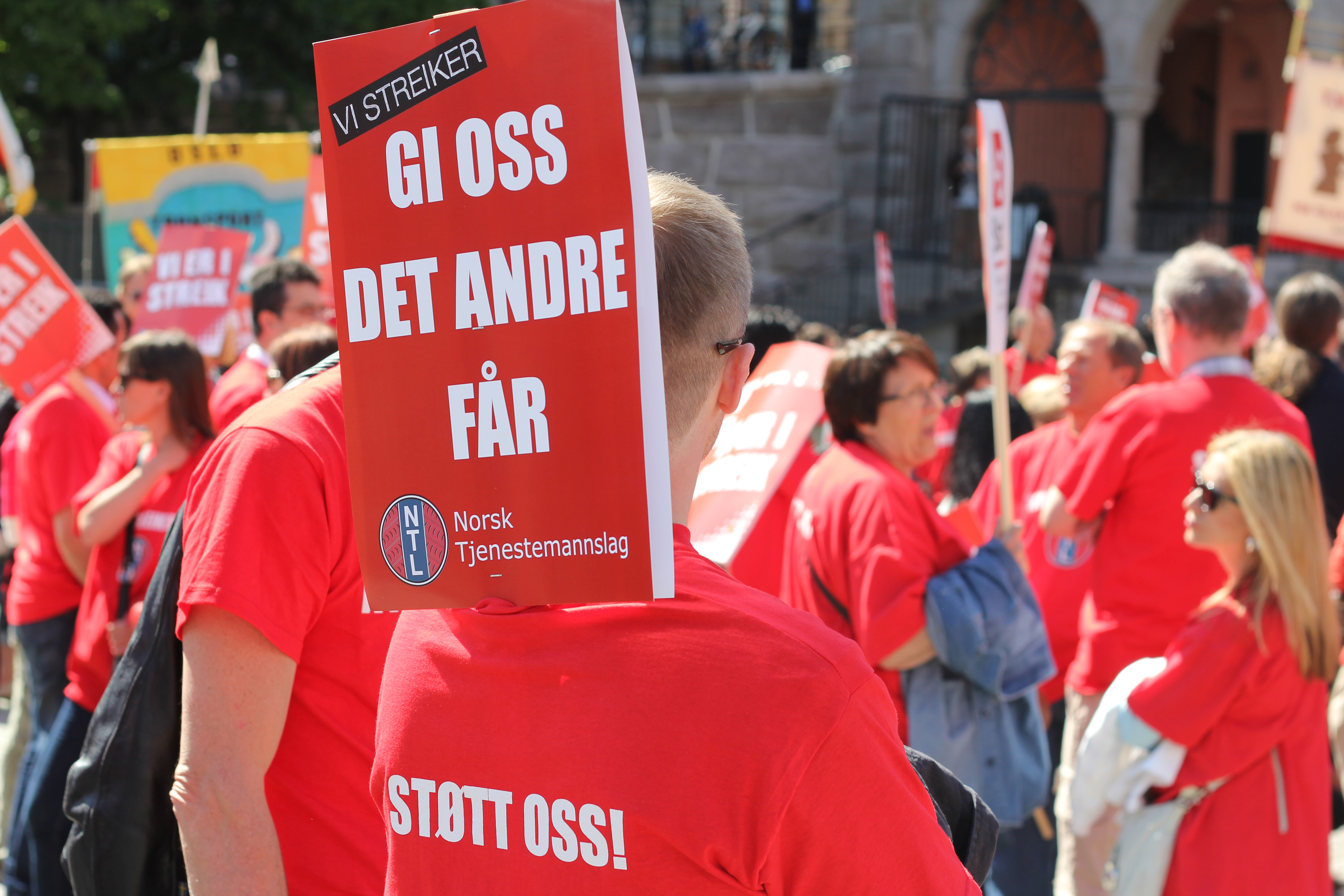
Members of the Norwegian trade union Norsk Tjenestemannslag (The Norwegian Civil Service Union) during a strike in 2012.

The Norwegian Civil Service Union (Norwegian: Norsk Tjenestemannslag, NTL) is a trade union representing civil servants in Norway.

The union was founded on 1 November 1947 and affiliated to the Norwegian Confederation of Trade Unions. By the end of the year, it had 800 members, but by 1965, this had grown to 25,000, making the largest union of civil servants in the country. Its membership is now more than 57,000.

== Presidents ==
1947: Reidar Gigernes
1950: Thorvald Karlsen
1978: Dagfinn Habberstad
1988: Jan Werner Hansen
1998: Turid Lilleheie
2010: John Leirvaag
2018: Kjersti Barsok
