= Norwegian Transport Workers' Union =

- Norsk Transportarbeiderforbund
- Abbreviation: NTF
- Merged into: United Federation of Trade Unions
- Founded: 1896
- Dissolved: May 2019
- Headquarters: Oslo, Norway
- Location: Norway
- Members: 20,000+
- Key people: Roger Hansen, president
- Affiliations: LO, ITF
- Website: transportarbeider.no

Norwegian Transport Workers' Union (Norwegian:Norsk Transportarbeiderforbund, NTF) was a Norwegian trade union which was established on 2 April 1896. The union organised workers in logistics and private goods and passenger transport. The main areas for the union were drivers plus workshop and maintenance personnel in the bus companies, warehouses and terminal workers, drivers in forwarding and wholesale industry, mailroom employees and delivering personnel in newspaper companies, taxi drivers, employees in the environmental industry (waste disposal and recycling), freight drivers (long and local transport of goods ) and stevedores workers in the ports.

The union had over 20,000 members in 20 unions across Norway.

The union's head office in Oslo consisted of eight officers and nine employees. NTF joined the Norwegian Confederation of Trade Unions (LO) in 1907 and was a member of the International Transport Workers' Federation. The unions' leader was Roger Hansen.

In 2019, the union merged into the United Federation of Trade Unions.
