= United Federation of Trade Unions =

Trade union in Norway

- Fellesforbundet
- Founded: October 1, 1882; 143 years ago (oldest union); May 8, 1988; 38 years ago (current form)
- Headquarters: Oslo, Norway
- Location: Norway
- Members: 174,985 (2025)
- Key people: Christian Justnes, president
- Affiliations: Norwegian Confederation of Trade Unions
- Website: https://fellesforbundet.no

The United Federation of Trade Unions (Norwegian: Fellesforbundet) is a general union in Norway. With a membership of 174,985 it is the largest private sector union in the country.

== History ==
The union is affiliated with the Norwegian Confederation of Trade Unions (LO). The union organises mainly members in the iron and metal industry, the shipbuilding industry, graphical sector, car repair workshops, aircraft repair workshops, hotel- and restaurants, the textile industry, the shoe industry, the building trade, the building industry, the paper industry, graphical branches, fish farming, and agriculture and forestry. More than 200 different trades and occupations are covered by the union.

It was established on 8 May 1988 as a merger among:

- the Garment Workers' Union (Norwegian: Bekledningsarbeiderforbundet, established 1969)
- Norwegian Union of Building Industry Workers (Norwegian: Norsk Bygningsindustriarbeiderforbund, established 1923)
- Norwegian Union of Iron and Metalworkers (Norwegian: Norsk Jern- og Metallarbeiderforbund, established 1891)
- Norwegian Union of Paper Industry Workers (Norwegian: Norsk Papirindustriarbeiderforbund, established 1913)
- the Norwegian Union of Forestry and Land Workers (Norwegian: Norsk Skog- og Landarbeiderforbund, established 1927)

The Norwegian Graphical Union (Norwegian: Norsk Grafisk Forbund, established 1882) subsequently joined in 2006 and the Hotel and Restaurant Workers' Union (Norwegian: Norsk Hotell- og Restaurantarbeiderforbund, established 1932) joined in 2007. In 2019, the Norwegian Transport Workers' Union joined.

== Presidents ==
1988–1991: John Stene
1991–2007: Kjell Bjørndalen
2007–2015: Arve Bakke
2015–2025: Jørn Eggum
2025: Christian Justnes
