= Norwegian Union of Municipal and General Employees =

Norwegian labour union

- Fagforbundet
- Headquarters: Oslo, Norway
- Location: Norway
- Members: 374,428
- Key people: Mette Nord
- Affiliations: LO
- Website: fagforbundet.no

The Norwegian Union of Municipal and General Employees (Norwegian: Fagforbundet) is a trade union in Norway. It has a membership of over 400,000 and is affiliated with the Norwegian Confederation of Trade Unions (LO).

It was founded in 2003 as a merger of the Norwegian Union of Municipal Employees and the Norwegian Association of Health and Social Care Personnel. In 2020, it was joined by the Norwegian Post and Communications Union.

== Presidents ==
2003: Jan Davidsen
2013: Mette Nord
