= Norwegian Confederation of Trade Unions =

National trade union center

- Landsorganisasjonen i Norge
- Abbreviation: LO
- Founded: 1899; 127 years ago
- Headquarters: Oslo, Norway
- Location: Norway
- Members: 1,038,502 (2025)
- Key people: President Kine Asper Vistnes
- Affiliations: ITUC, ETUC, NFS
- Website: lo.no

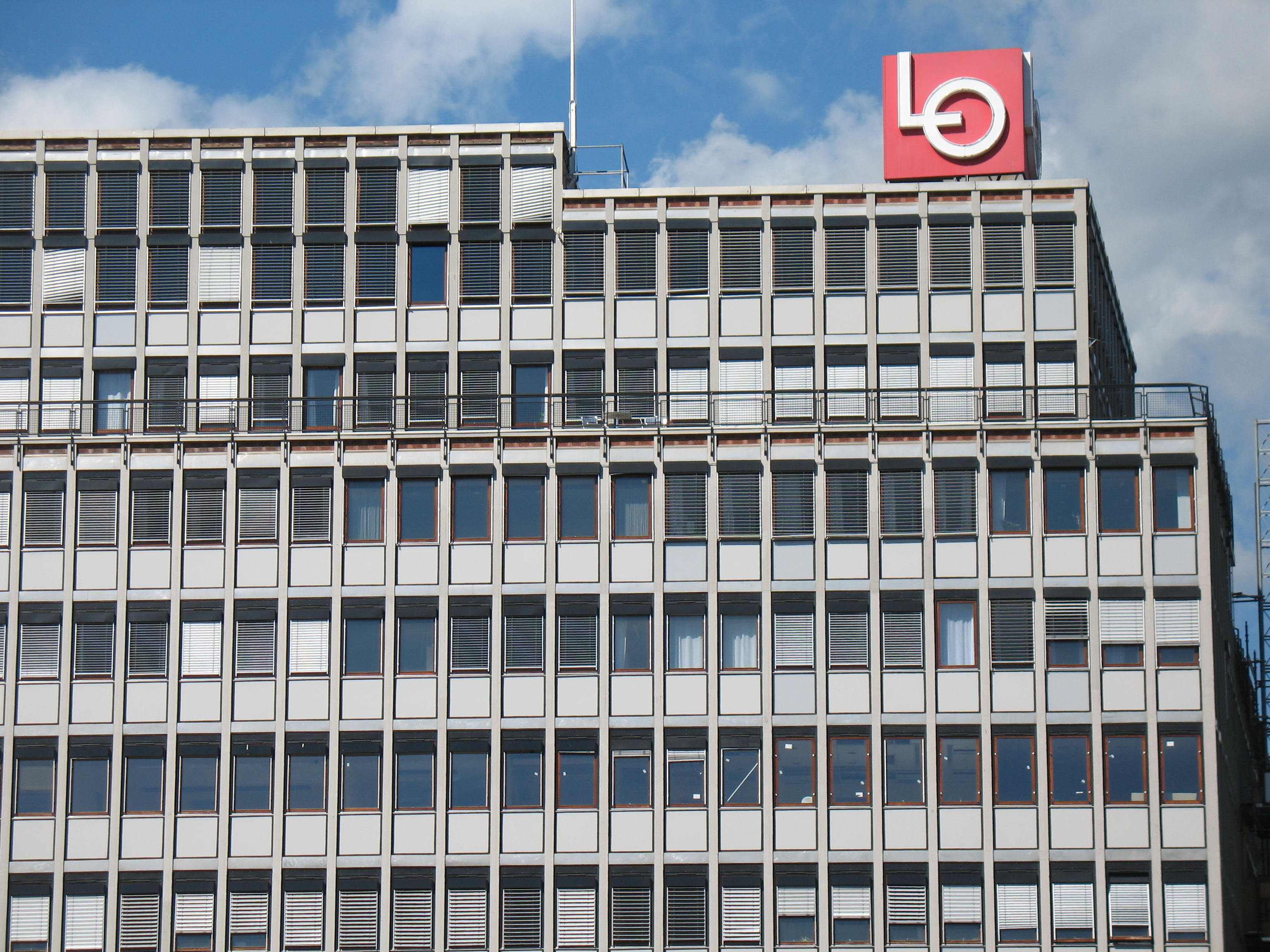
The headquarters of Norwegian Confederation of Trade Unions, LO (Folkets Hus) at Youngstorget in Oslo

The Norwegian Confederation of Trade Unions (Norwegian: Landsorganisasjonen i Norge, LO) is a national trade union center, the largest and probably the most influential umbrella organization of labour unions in Norway. The 23 national unions affiliated to the LO have 1,038,502 members as of 2025. The majority of affiliated unions organizes traditional blue collar workers, but the largest affiliate is the Norwegian Union of Municipal and General Employees which makes up more than a third of all members. LO is affiliated to the ITUC and the ETUC.

It was named the Workers' National Trade Union (Norwegian: Arbeidernes Faglige Landsorganisasjon, AFL) from 1899 to 1957. Affiliated with the Labour Party throughout its history, several of LO's member unions have concurrently been member bodies in the Labour Party.

The organization owns the Norwegian Labour Movement Archives and Library.

== Affiliates ==
=== Current affiliates ===
Union	Abbreviation	Founded	Membership (2019)
Norwegian Authors' Union		2018	
Cabin Crew Union Norway	NKF	1978	402
Creo	Creo	2001	9,533
Electrician and IT Workers' Union	El & IT	1999	40,225
Industri Energi	IE	2006	56,220
Labour Press Union	APF	1909	
National Union of Norwegian Locomotivemen	NLF	1893	
Norwegian Airline Pilots Association	NF	1977	
Norwegian Civil Service Union	NTL	1947	53,087
Norwegian Engineers' and Managers' Association	FLT	1951	21,935
Norwegian Manual Therapist Association	NMF	2006	
Norwegian Maritime Officers' Union	NSOF	1995	7,106
Norwegian Players' Association	NISO	1995	
Writers' Guild of Norway	NDF	1938	
Norwegian Prison and Probation Officers' Union	NFF	1918	
Norwegian Seafarers' Union	NSF	1910	11,488
Norwegian Union of Food, Beverage and Allied Workers	NNN	1923	28,221
Norwegian Union of General Workers	NAF	1895	34,921
Norwegian Union of Military Officers	NOF	1896	8,496
Norwegian Union of Municipal and General Employees	NUMGE	2003	396,548
Norwegian Union of Railway Workers	NJF	1892	
Norwegian Union of School Employees	SL	1982	7,544
Norwegian Union of Social Educators and Social Workers	FO	1992	31,000
Union of Employees in Commerce and Offices	HK	1970	74,050
United Federation of Trade Unions	FF	1988	164,679

=== Former affiliates ===
Union	Abbreviation	Founded	Left	Reason not affiliated	Membership (1924)	Membership (1963)	Membership (1991)
Garment Workers' Union	BAF	1969	1988	Merged into FF	N/A	N/A	N/A
Hotel and Restaurant Workers' Union	HRAF	1931	2007	Merged into FF	N/A	9,345	16,036
National Union of District Police Officers		1914	1984	Disaffiliated		800	N/A
National Union of Postal Clerks	PLF	1903	1977	Merged into DNP		2,524	N/A
Norwegian Air Force Officers' Union		1956		Disaffiliated	N/A	1,660	N/A
Norwegian Bakery and Confectionery Workers' Union	NBKF	1893	1962	Merged into NNN	1,723	N/A	N/A
Norwegian Barbers' and Hairdressers' Union	NBFF		1937	Merged into NKF	35	N/A	N/A
Norwegian Cockpit Union	Cockpit	2015	2016	Merged into NF	N/A	N/A	N/A
Norwegian Fire Brigades Union		1909	1925	Merged into NKF		N/A	N/A
Norwegian Graphical Union	NGF	1967	2006	Merged into FF	N/A	N/A	14,894
Norwegian Lithographic and Chemographic Union		1901	1967	Merged into NGF	480	1,837	N/A
Norwegian Musicians' Union	NM	1911	2001	Merged into Creo	N/A	1,271	2,248
Norwegian Nurses' Union	NVF	1962	1992	Merged into FO	N/A	N/A	2,421
Norwegian Oil and Petrochemical Union	NOPEF	1977	2006	Merged into IE	N/A	N/A	8,797
Norwegian Post and Communications Union	POSTKOM	2000	2020	Merged into NUMGE	N/A	N/A	N/A
Norwegian Post Organisation	DNP	1977	2000	Merged into POSTKOM	N/A	N/A	15,442
Norwegian Social Workers' Union	NoSo	1959	1992	Merged into FO	N/A	N/A	4,726
Norwegian Telecommunication and Data Workers' Union	TD	1988	1998	Merged into EL&IT	N/A	N/A	16,387
Norwegian Telecommunication Organisation	DNTO	1909	1988	Merged into TD		1,638	N/A
Norwegian Tobacco Workers' Union	NTF	1910	1962	Merged into NNN	702	N/A	N/A
Norwegian Tramway Union		1901	1921	Merged into NKF	N/A	N/A	N/A
Norwegian Transport Workers' Union	NTF	1896	2019	Merged into FF	4,802	21,609	15,803
Norwegian Union of Bookbinders and Cardboard Workers	NBKF	1898	1967	Merged into NGF	1,246	4,556	N/A
Norwegian Union of Bricklayers	NMF	1900	1976	Merged into NBIAF	2,354	5,023	N/A
Norwegian Union of Building Industry Workers	NBIAF	1923	1988	Merged into FF	7,440	51,394	N/A
Norwegian Union of Cantors and Organists	NKOF	1904	2001	Merged into Creo	N/A	N/A	775
Norwegian Union of Chemical Industry Workers	NKIF	1923	2006	Merged into IE	4,955	30,595	34,896
Norwegian Union of Child Welfare Educators	NBF	1969	1992	Merged into FO	N/A	N/A	2,020
Norwegian Union of Clothing Workers	BAF	1892	1969	Merged into BAF	1,080	14,259	N/A
Norwegian Union of Customs Officials		1904		Disaffiliated		1,050	N/A
Norwegian Union of Electricians and Power Station Officials	NEKF	1918	1999	Merged into EL&IT	1,466	12,152	27,151
Norwegian Union of Forestry and Land Workers	NSLF	1927	1988	Merged into FF	N/A	20,369	N/A
Norwegian Union of Foundry Workers		1898	1960	Merged into NJMF	1,650	N/A	N/A
Norwegian Union of Gold Workers	NGAF	1909	1985	Merged into NJMF	435	1,033	N/A
Norwegian Union of Hide and Leather Workers		1909	1973	Merged into BAF	426	1,300	N/A
Norwegian Union of Iron and Metalworkers	NJMF	1891	1988	Merged into FF	11,265	75,028	N/A
Norwegian Union of Journeymen Watchmakers		1947	1983		N/A	89	N/A
Norwegian Union of Marine Pilots		1946			N/A	449	N/A
Norwegian Union of Meat Industry Workers	NKIF	1907	1970	Merged into NNN	524	4,024	N/A
Norwegian Union of Municipal Employees	NKF	1920	2003	Merged into NUMGE	5,835	59,831	200,320
Norwegian Union of Painters		1896	1923	Merged into NBIAF	N/A	N/A	N/A
Norwegian Union of Paper Industry Workers	NPF	1913	1988	Merged into FF	10,162	19,088	N/A
Norwegian Union of Planing Workers		1911	1949	Merged into NBIAF	3,882	N/A	N/A
Norwegian Union of Police	NPF	1905	1997	Merged into PF		2,213	N/A
Norwegian Union of Postal Officials	DNP	1884	1977	Merged into DNP		3,127	N/A
Norwegian Union of Postmen	NPF	1901	2000	Merged into POSTKOM	959	4,426	14,498
Norwegian Union of Shoe Makers		1890	1969	Merged into BAF	1,934	3,833	N/A
Norwegian Union of Stone Industry Workers		1894	1961	Merged into NBIAF	873	N/A	N/A
Norwegian Union of Telecommunication Workers	NTTF	1930	1988	Merged into TD	N/A	8,047	N/A
Norwegian Union of Textile Workers	NTF	1924	1969	Merged into BAF	N/A	9,902	N/A
Norwegian Union of Typographers		1882	1967	Merged into NGF	7,440	6,363	N/A
Norwegian Union of Wood Industry Workers	NTAF	1904	2009	Merged into IE	1,200	5,743	5,122
Wood Workers' Union of Norway		1889	1923	Merged into NBIAF	N/A	N/A	N/A

== See also ==
- Leaders of the Norwegian Confederation of Trade Unions
- LO Stat
- Danish Confederation of Trade Unions (Danish LO)
- Swedish Trade Union Confederation (Swedish LO)
