= Olaf Bjerke =

Norwegian trade unionist and politician

Personal details
- Born: 6 January 1893
- Died: 21 September 1957 (aged 64)
- Party: Communist Party of Norway

Olaf Bjerke (6 January 1893 – 21 September 1957) was a Norwegian trade unionist and politician for the Communist Party.

During the occupation of Norway by Nazi Germany he was arrested on 10 September 1941 after the milk strike. He was imprisoned at Møllergata 19, then in Grini concentration camp, then in Sachsenhausen concentration camp until the end of World War II. The communist inmates formed a caucus in the camp, and Bjerke was among the leading members along with Kristian Mugaas, Johan Strand Johansen, Olaf Skramstad, Halvor Sørum and Erling Heiestad.

A railway worker, Bjerke was involved in the trade union Norwegian Union of Railway Workers. As former chairman Ludvik Buland died in a concentration camp in 1945, Bjerke came close to being elected chairman at the national convention later that year, but lost the vote to the Social Democrat Marius Trana. The electoral committee had been unified in its support of Bjerke, but reportedly Haakon Lie and Trygve Bratteli swayed the result in Trana's favor. He did become elected to the Norwegian Confederation of Trade Unions secretariat, as the only communist.

He also entered the Communist Party leadership stratum. Bjerke served as a deputy representative to the Parliament of Norway from Oslo during the term 1954–1957. He died in September 1957.
