= Ludvik Buland =

Norwegian trade unionist (1893–1945)

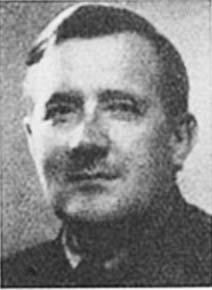
- Born: 6 May 1893; Hegra, Norway
- Died: 5 February 1945 (aged 51); Coswig
- Occupation: Trade unionist

Ludvik Buland (6 May 1893 – 5 February 1945) was a Norwegian trade unionist. He chaired the Norwegian Union of Railway Workers, but was imprisoned and died during the occupation of Norway by Nazi Germany.

== Early life and career ==
Ludvik Buland was born in Buland, Hegra as the son of Gunnar Lorentsen Buland and his wife Kristine Ingebrigtsdatter Kleivgjerdet. He took secondary education, and was hired in the Norwegian State Railways in 1914. After some time he was promoted to railway station manager. He was the chairman of his local trade union from 1920 to 1928, and vice chairman of the national Norwegian Union of Railway Workers, affiliated with the Norwegian Confederation of Trade Unions (LO), from 1928 to 1930. The union had witnessed turbulent times in the 1920s, with inner strife between communists and social democrats. Buland had been an elected politician for the Labour Party, serving in Trondheim city council from 1925 to 1930. In 1930 he became chairman of the Union of Railway Workers, and succeeded in his task to reinforce the union.

He had four children.

== World War II ==
At the time of the German invasion of Norway in 1940, Buland was still chairman of the Union of Railway Workers. The leadership of the LO fled Oslo shortly after the invasion, and secretary Elias Volan, a former member Communist Party member, became chairman. Volan cooperated and negotiated with the Nazi occupants to a certain degree, but was pressured by the loosely organized Fagopposisjonen av 1940 (trade opposition of 1940), spearheaded by Håkon Meyer and Jens Tangen, who went further in stressing the importance of cooperation. Buland, too, was a member of this opposition. Following a higher degree of German control, represented by Reichskommissar Josef Terboven who formed a cabinet on 25 September, Volan was removed as LO chairman on 28 September, paving the way for Jens Tangen as the new chairman and Ludvik Buland as deputy chairman.

However, the new LO leadership grew uneasy with the attempts on Nazification of the union. On 3 April and 15 May 1941 Buland signed two letters to Terboven, protesting this development. The 15 May letter was signed by forty-two other organizations, hence it was dubbed "the protest of the 43". On 18 June 1941, Terboven summoned the protesters to a meeting in the Parliament Building of Norway. Six of the protesters who showed up were arrested on the spot, among them Buland. He was incarcerated for a short period, at Møllergata 19 from June to July 1941.

In September 1941, Buland was arrested for the second time. This time the pretext was a martial law that followed the so-called milk strike. The milk strike occurred on 9 September, and martial law was declared the next day. A local union leader, Rolf Wickstrøm, and chief jurist in the Confederation of Trade Unions, Viggo Hansteen, were executed immediately. Ludvik Buland, together with the other labour leaders Josef Larsson and Harry Vestli received death sentences. The Confederation of Trade Unions were usurped by the Nazis, who installed Odd Fossum as chairman. Håkon Meyer from the trade opposition, who had joined the Nazi Party, was promoted as well.

Buland, Larsson and Vestli were later reprieved, and instead given a lifelong jail sentence. After some time in Grini concentration camp from September to October 1941, he was sent via Akershus Fortress to the Nacht und Nebel camp Hamburg-Fuhlsbüttel where he arrived on 16 October. He was transferred to Rendsburg in August 1943, then to Dreibergen, Köln and Coswig. He died on 5 February 1945, shortly before the war's end.
