= Jens Tangen =

Norwegian trade unionist (1897–1980)

Jens Eugen Tangen (20 July 1897 – 22 September 1980) was a Norwegian trade unionist.

== Career ==
Tangen chaired the trade union Norwegian Union of Building Workers from 1935, having been deputy chairman from 1933 to 1934. In 1940, he was a central member of Fagopposisjonen av 1940 (Trade Opposition of 1940), for which he chaired the executive committee. The purpose of the Trade Opposition was to use the recent German occupation of Norway for the better, in the then-absence of a real "bourgeois" political authority. The Trade Opposition leader Håkon Meyer became more content with cooperating with the Nazis, including the Norwegian Fascist party, and on 28 September 1940 Tangen was ordered by the Nazis to assume the chairmanship of the Norwegian Confederation of Trade Unions. He chose Ludvik Buland as deputy chairman. Tangen cooperated to a certain degree with the Nazis, and visited Germany in January 1941. He became unpopular with some, but never became popular with the authorities either.

== Imprisonment ==
Following the milk strike in September 1941, the Nazis took a tighter grip on society in general, usurped the Confederation of Trade Unions completely and installed Odd Fossum as new leader on 10 September. Tangen was arrested and imprisoned in Grini concentration camp from 10 September 1941 to 27 February 1942, and then at Møllergata 19 for one week. After his release, he fled to Sweden, where he played no political role. Ludvik Buland was imprisoned and died in Germany, whereas the head of the judicial office in the Confederation, Viggo Hansteen, was executed.

== Post-war ==
After the war, in 1946, Tangen was excluded by the Congress of the Confederation of Trade Unions for collaboration. His personal secretary, Martin Brendberg, was excluded as well. However, Tangen was acquitted of treason by Oslo City Court in 1949, as a part of the legal purge in Norway after World War II. The court found that his degree of cooperation was acceptable.
