= Halvor Sørum =

Norwegian trade unionist and politician

Halvor Enok Sørum (5 April 1897 – 1965) was a Norwegian trade unionist and politician for the Communist Party.

He was a painter by profession. He joined Norges Socialdemokratiske Ungdomsforbund (NSU) in 1914, the Norwegian Labour Party in 1915. When NSU changed its name to the Young Communist League in 1921, Sørum chaired the Hedmark branch from 1922 to 1923. In 1923 he broke away from the Labour Party, joining the new Communist Party. He led the party's agitprop committee, and was an editorial board member of Proletaren from 1925 to 1927. He was a politburo member in 1929, and then from 1932. He was also a central board member; illegally so during the occupation of Norway by Nazi Germany which started in 1940.

At the Norwegian Confederation of Trade Unions national convention in 1934, he forwarded a motion of no confidence against the leader, former communist Halvard Olsen. The motion received only 41 votes, but another motion from Rolf Olsen passed with 263 against 98 votes, uniting communists and "Tramælites" against the union leadership. In the late 1930s Sørum was "the leading trade unionist of the communists". In 1940 he was a member of the Trade Opposition of 1940, which advocated a cooperative environment between trade unions and the occupational authorities, but he eventually took the stance that the trade unions should work illegally. In 1941 he formed a committee, together with Konrad Nordahl and Lars Evensen, to prepare illegality as well as a cooperation with Labour Party unionists. He worked underground for the illegal (non-Nazi) part of the Union of Building Industry Workers. He was eventually arrested on 10 January 1943 and imprisoned in Grini concentration camp before being sent to Sachsenhausen concentration camp on 27 February 1944. He remained here until the end of World War II. The communist inmates in the camp formed a caucus of sorts, and Sørum was among the leading members along with Kristian Mugaas, Johan Strand Johansen, Olaf Skramstad, Olaf Bjerke and Erling Heiestad.

After the war, from 1946 to 1949, he was the deputy chairman of the Norwegian Union of Building Industry Workers. In contrast to some wartime communist leaders, he remained in the party leadership. He died in 1965.
