= Harry Vestli =

Norwegian trade unionist

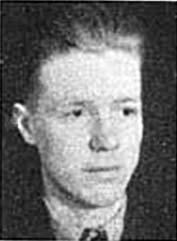
Harry August Vestli

Harry August Vestli (10 May 1918 – 2 September 1942) was a Norwegian trade unionist who was imprisoned and died during the occupation of Norway by Nazi Germany.

Harry Vestli was born in Sande i Vestfold as the son of Petter Rikard Vestli and his Swedish wife Emma Kristine. He had three siblings. He had gone through middle school, and worked at the factory Lilleborg, where he was the union steward.

On 9 September 1941, the so-called milk strike occurred in Oslo. The Nazi German occupants of Norway ordered a harsh crackdown on the striking workers, and martial law was declared the next day. A local union leader, Rolf Wickstrøm, and chief jurist in the Confederation of Trade Unions, Viggo Hansteen were executed immediately. Arrested on 12 September, Harry Vestli was sentenced to death together with Ludvik Buland and Josef Larsson, but the three were later reprieved, and instead given a lifelong jail sentence. Vestli was imprisoned at both Grini and Akershus Fortress, before being sent to Germany on 16 October 1941. While imprisoned here he contracted tuberculosis. He died in September 1942 at a hospital in Hamburg.
