= Karsten Torkildsen =

Norwegian trade unionist (1896–1979)

External image
- Torkildsen (right) with Konrad Nordahl (right) and Josef Larsson.

Karsten Ingemann Torkildsen (18 December 1896 – 26 February 1979) was a Norwegian trade unionist and politician for the Labour Party.

He was born in Kristiania and married in 1932. He moved to Rjukan in 1915 and started his trade union career here as vice chair of the Rjukan faglige samorg in 1920. He also held this post in 1924 and 1925, and was deputy chair of Rjukan Labour Party in 1920. He was a deputy member of the municipal council of Tinn Municipality from 1919 to 1922 and councilman from 1928 to 1930. In 1927 and 1930 he chaired Rjukan faglige samorg. From 1930 to 1934 he was employed as secretary of Øvre Telemark faglige samorg and Telemark Labour Party. He moved to Notodden Municipality where he chaired the local party chapter from 1931 to 1934 and the co-op from 1933 to 1934.

Nationwide he served as chairman of the Norwegian Union of Chemical Industry Workers from 1934 to 1945 and chairman from 1945 to 1963. As such was also a secretariat member of the Norwegian Confederation of Trade Unions. During the occupation of Norway by Nazi Germany (1940–1945), however, the trade union movement was usurped by the Nazis. Torkildsen fled to Sweden. Here, in 1942 he was elected as chair of the exiled branch of the Norwegian People's Aid. He later served as chairman here after the war, from 1947 to 1951.

He was also given a multitude of other positions. From 1945 he was a member of Norges Eksportråd. In 1946 he was elected to the board of Norsk Folkeferie (until 1950) and the supervisory council of Norsk Hydro (until 1963). From 1947 he was a board member of Arbeidernes Landsbank and member of the Defence Commission of 1946. He died in February 1979 and was buried at Grefsen.

Non-profit organization positions
Preceded by Andreas Diesen	Chairman of Norwegian People's Aid; 1947–1951	Succeeded by Sigurd Halvorsen
