= Ryste =

Ryste may refer to:

- Bodil Ryste (b. 1979), Norwegian ski mountaineer and cross-country skier
- Ruth Anlaug Ryste (b. 1932), personal secretary to Norwegian ministers
