= Tonsen Church (Oslo) =

Coordinates: 59°56′34″N 10°48′18″E

- Tonsen kirke
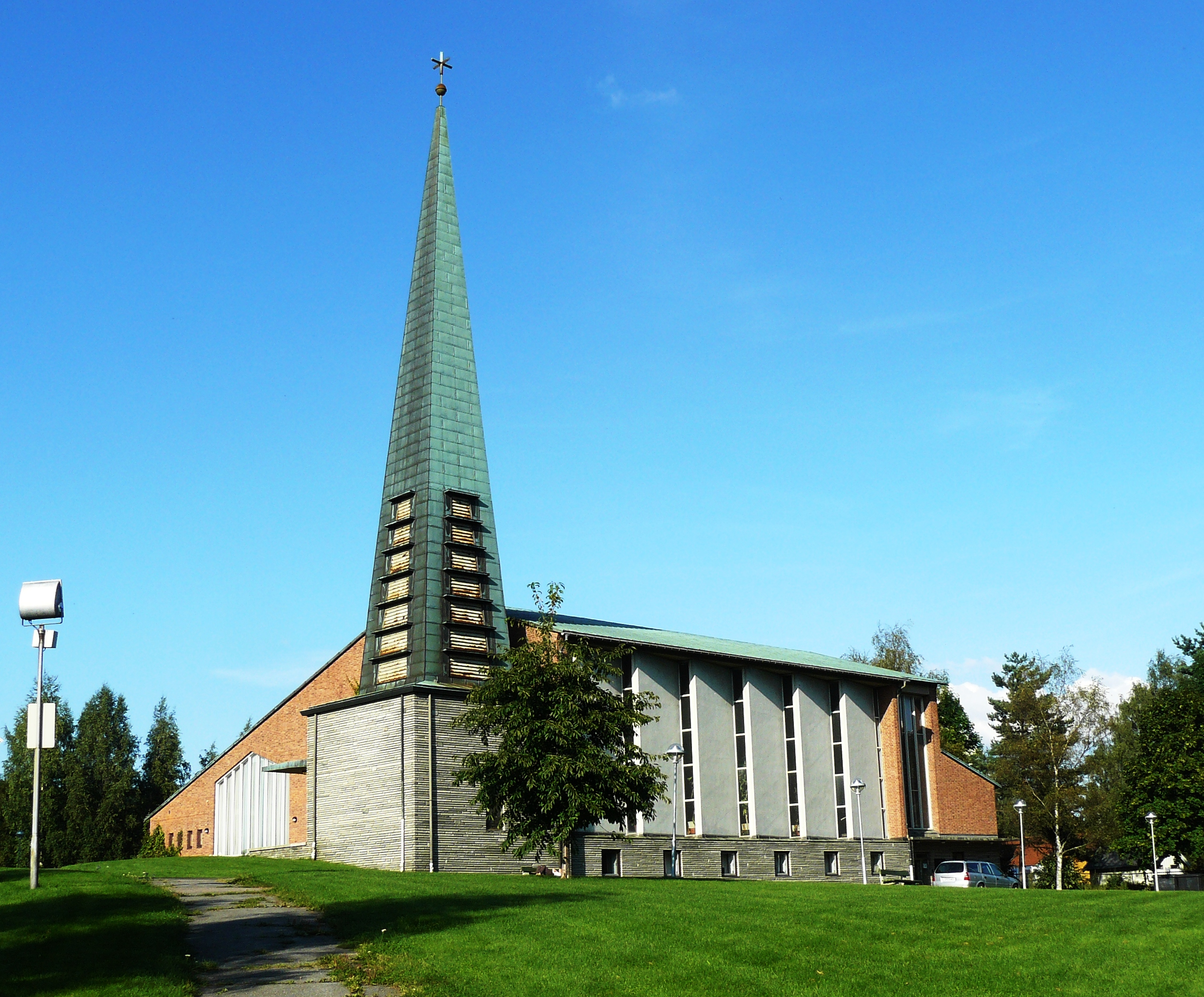

- Location in Oslo Tonsen Church (Norway)
- Location: Traverveien 16, Oslo
- Country: Norway
- Denomination: Church of Norway
- Churchmanship: Evangelical Lutheran

History
- Status: Parish church

Architecture
- Functional status: Active
- Architect(s): Georg Greve; Geir Grung
- Completed: 1961

Specifications
- Capacity: 400 + 200
- Materials: Brick, slate

Administration
- Diocese: Diocese of Oslo
- Deanery: Nordre Aker

Tonsen Church (Norwegian: Tonsen kirke) is a church in Oslo, Norway which was built in 1961. It is located at Årvoll in the borough of Bjerke. The church was constructed by the architects Georg Greve (architect) and Geir Grung.

In the porch vestibule at the foot of the bell tower is a stained glass window, created by Bernhard Greve. It shows Jesus standing above a cross. The church bells are cast by Olsen Nauen Bell Foundry.

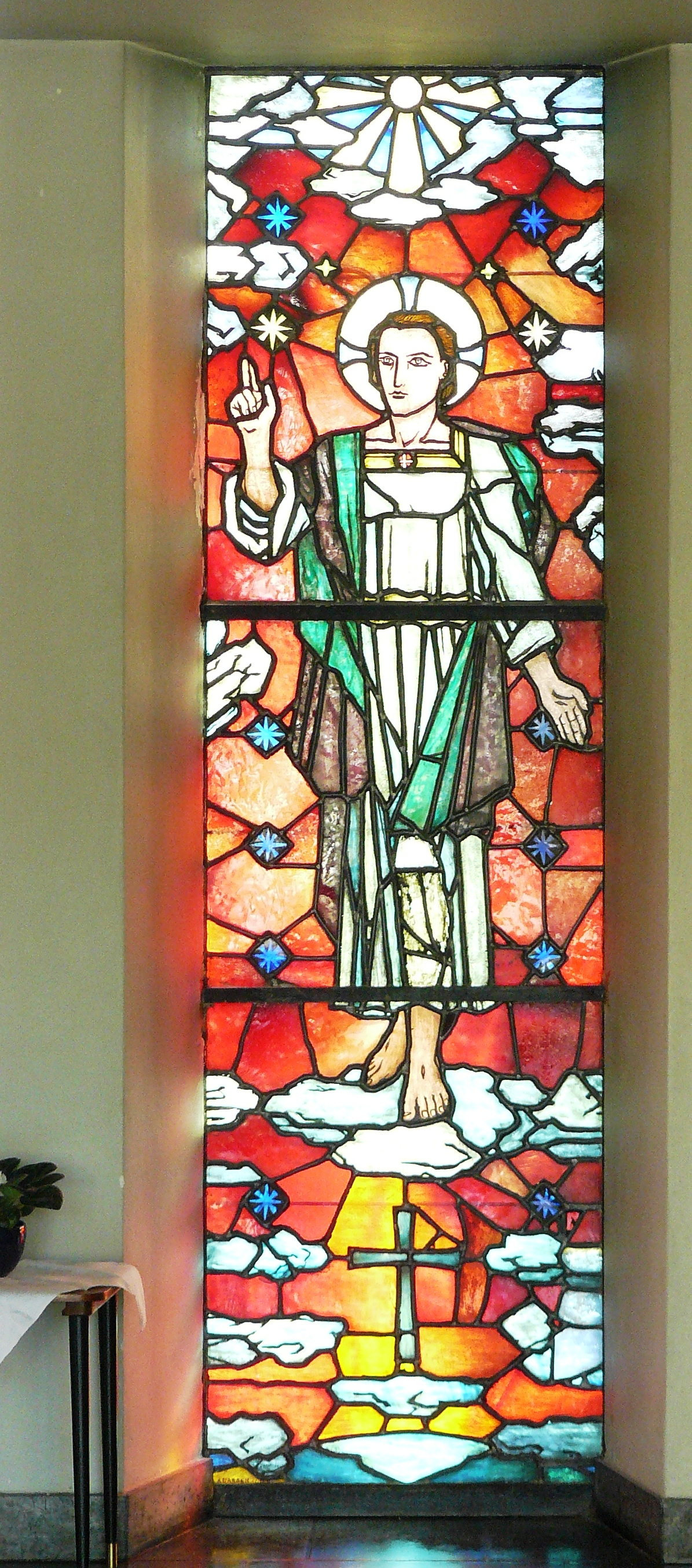
The stained glass window by Bernhard Greve

An altar crucifix is modeled by Ståle Kyllingstad. On the back wall is a fresco illustrating the Sermon on the Mount which was conducted by Kåre Jonsborg in 1963. The pulpit and altar call is cast in cement, and the font is in teak, all created in 1961.

The church hall has 400 seats and there are 200 seats in the adjacent hall.

The church office is located in the basement, which also houses scouts.

The church is listed by the Norwegian Directorate for Cultural Heritage.
