= Kåre Rein =

Norwegian trade unionist

Kåre Trygve Rein (8 April 1911 – 20 March 1995) was a Norwegian trade unionist.

He was a trade unionist before the war, a secretary in the Union of Employees in Commerce and Offices. He was also a member of the Norwegian Labour Party, but together with people like Håkon Meyer he joined Fagopposisjonen av 1940 in 1940 and the Fascist party Nasjonal Samling in September 1941. From 1940 Norway was occupied by Nazi Germany, and the Nazis controlled the Norwegian Confederation of Trade Unions. Following the Milk strike a Nazi-friendly leadership was installed, with Odd Fossum as leader, Erling Olsen as deputy leader and Kåre Rein as secretary. Many years later, Rein claimed that he was ordered to take over as secretary by an armed German, and that he received threats of being arrested for sabotage if he declined. Rein remained secretary until New Year's in 1943. He was then acting leader until September 1943, when he became the leader of Sol i Arbeid. This was a Norwegian version of Schönheit der Arbeit (Kraft durch Freude). In March 1945 he became Nazi-installed leader of the Confederation of Trade Unions, succeeding Odd Fossum.

He lost all positions in 1945 at the war's end. During the legal purge in Norway after World War II he was convicted of treason and in 1947 sentenced to six years of forced labour.
