= Erling Olsen (trade unionist) =

Norwegian trade unionist

Erling Olsen (1901–1983) was a Norwegian trade unionist.

He was a trade unionist before the war, a secretary in Norwegian Union of Municipal Employees. He was also a member of Mot Dag for some time.

From 1940 Norway was occupied by Nazi Germany. Together with people like Håkon Meyer and Kåre Rein he joined Fagopposisjonen av 1940 in 1940 and the Fascist party Nasjonal Samling in December 1940. Following the Milk strike a more Nazi-friendly leadership was installed in the Norwegian Confederation of Trade Unions, with Odd Fossum as leader, Erling Olsen as deputy leader and Kåre Rein as secretary. Olsen was even acting leader from 10 September 1941 to 31 December 1942.

In the autumn, Håkon Meyer was fired as leader of the mega-union Forbundet for offentlige yrker. Olsen was installed as leader, serving for a short time. He was then fired, formally for alcohol abuse and economic irregularities, but he had also criticized Just Lippestad and Odd Fossum. In November 1942, Olsen had initiated his own campaign against "incompetence" in Nasjonal Samling, and posed the threat that if Lippestad did not remove incompetent elements, Olsen would make use of a ticket to London, claimed to be in his possession. Olsen tried to cooperate with Kåre Rein, who was of better standing, but Rein found Olsen and his supporters to "not hold water morally and character-wise". Olsen quarreled with Lippestad and Fossum during a study trip to Germany, and Fossum stripped him of the title as deputy leader of NS Faggruppeorganisasjon. Fossum even had Statspolitiet arrest Olsen, but he was released as Statspolitiet and Sikkerhetspolitiet found no grounds for incarceration.

In January 1943, Olsen was hired in a minor job in the Directorate of Labour (not to be confused with the later Directorate of Labour). He worked here in 1943 and from July 1944 to May 1945. He lost his position at the end of the war, but had since long faded into obscurity.

During the legal purge in Norway after World War II he was convicted of treason and in May 1946 sentenced to seven years of forced labour and confiscation of 20,000 kr.
