= Tor Aspengren =

Norwegian laborer, trade unionist and politician for the Labour Party

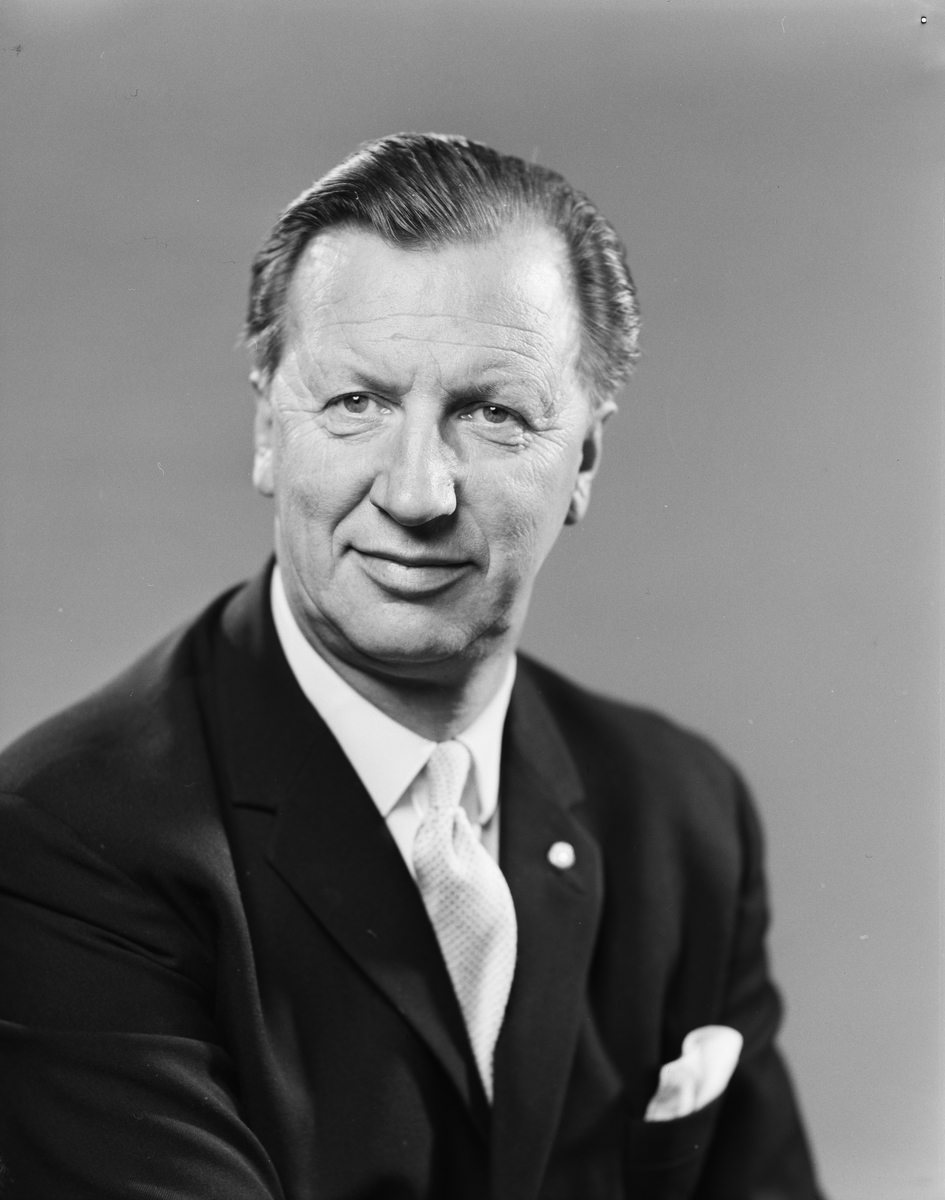
Tor Aspengren.

Ivar Tor Aspengren (1 February 1917 – 23 June 2004) was a Norwegian laborer, trade unionist and politician for the Labour Party. He led the Norwegian Confederation of Trade Unions from 1969 to 1977.

He was born in Nydalen, Aker as a son of Swedish immigrant Gothard Aspengren (1876–1925), who worked at Christiania Spigerverk, and cleaner Thora Aspengren (1881–1961). His father died from a working accident when Tor Aspengren was eight years old. Nonetheless, he started working there at age 14, and remained there from 1931 to 1948. He joined the local trade union Norwegian Union of Iron and Metal Workers already in 1931. He also practiced workers sports in Nydalen AIL.

In 1947 he became board chairman of the Oslo branch of the Union of Iron and Metal Workers. He was hired to work for the union in 1949. From 1949 to 1951 and 1959 to 1979 he was also a central board member of the Norwegian Labour Party. In October 1958 he succeeded Josef Larsson as chairman of the Union of Iron and Metal Workers, where he remained until 1966. From 1966 to 1969 he was the deputy leader of the national trade union center Norwegian Confederation of Trade Unions, and from 1969 to 1977 he was their leader.

He was board chairman of Norsk Arbeiderpresse from 1965 to 1981 and Statens Industrifond from 1977 to 1987, board member of Norsk Hydro, Aktietrykkeriet and Norsk Jernverk and from 1978 to 1987 a member of the Labour Court of Norway. From 1988 to 1991 he was a representative in Oslo city council.

He was married to Palma Myklebust (1913–1996), and he died in June 2004 in Oslo.

Trade union offices
Preceded by Parelius Mentsen	Leader of the Norwegian Confederation of Trade Unions; 1969–1977	Succeeded by Tor Halvorsen
