= Olaf Skramstad =

Norwegian politician (1894–1956)

Olaf Olsen Skramstad (8 March 1894 – 12 November 1956) was a Norwegian politician for the Communist Party.

He was organized in a trade union and the Norwegian Labour Party in 1915. He later joined the Communist Party and was a member of the municipal council of Åmot Municipality from 1926 to 1933. He was the secretary in the Norwegian Union of Forestry and Land Workers from 1929 to 1931. In 1930 he was sentenced to 4 months of jail for participating in the Etna-Dokka labour conflict.

During the occupation of Norway by Nazi Germany, he was imprisoned in October 1941. He was incarcerated in Hamar from 26 October to 4 November, then in Grini concentration camp until 3 April 1942, then in Sachsenhausen concentration camp. The communist inmates in the camp formed a caucus of sorts, and Sørum was among the leading members along with Kristian Mugaas, Johan Strand Johansen, Halvor Sørum, Olaf Bjerke and Erling Heiestad.

He died in November 1956 and was buried at Åmot Church.
