= John Marius Trana =

Norwegian politician (1898–1976)

John Marius Trana (22 June 1898 – 29 August 1976) was a Norwegian trade unionist and politician for the Labour Party. He chaired the Norwegian Union of Railway Workers from 1945 to 1963, and served as a deputy representative in the Norwegian Parliament.

== Career ==
He was born in Verdal Municipality as the son of railway manager John Trana (1871–1920) and his wife Marie Justine Freberg (1867–1949).

John Marius Trana was hired by the Norwegian State Railways in 1917, and was promoted to railway manager in 1921. He became involved in the trade union Norwegian Union of Railway Workers, serving as a member of the national board from 1932 to 1941. From 1941 to 1945, during the occupation of Norway by Nazi Germany when the Nazi occupants usurped the trade union, Trana was the chairman of the illegal shadow union. The pre-war union chairman, Ludvik Buland, was imprisoned in a concentration camp in 1941. Buland died in prison in 1945, and following the liberation of Norway in May that year, Trana was elected as the new chairman. He was challenged by Communist candidate Olaf Bjerke, but won the vote at the national convention. He chaired the union until 1963, and was later given honorary membership.

In the Norwegian Confederation of Trade Unions, the national trade union center in Norway, he was a member of the board from 1945 to 1949 and of the secretariat from 1949 to 1963. From 1949 to 1963, he also chaired the Statstjenestemannskartellet, a cartel within the Confederation of Trade Unions for workers in the public sector. Trana was also a member of the board of the railway section in the International Transport Workers' Federation.

Trana had a political background as a member of the executive committee of Oslo city council from 1931 to 1937. He served as a deputy representative to the Norwegian Parliament from Oslo during the terms 1954–1957 and 1958–1961.
