= Sigurd Halvorsen =

Norwegian trade unionist and politician

Sigurd Harald Halvorsen (1910–1978) was a Norwegian trade unionist and politician for the Labour Party.

He was born in Kristiania. He spent his career as secretary and from 1958 treasurer of the Norwegian Union of Municipal Employees.

From 1946 to 1955 he was an elected member of Oslo city council. He also chaired Europahjelpen in 1951 and the Norwegian People's Aid from 1951 to 1963, Statens edruskapsdirektorat from 1956 to 1978 and the Norwegian Refugee Council from 1958 to 1977 (formerly vice chairman since 1952).

| Preceded by Karsten Torkildsen | Chairman of the Norwegian People's Aid; 1951–1963 | Succeeded by Jonn Caspersen |
