= Årvoll =

Community in Oslo, Norway

Coordinates: 59°57′0.48″N 10°49′32.66″E

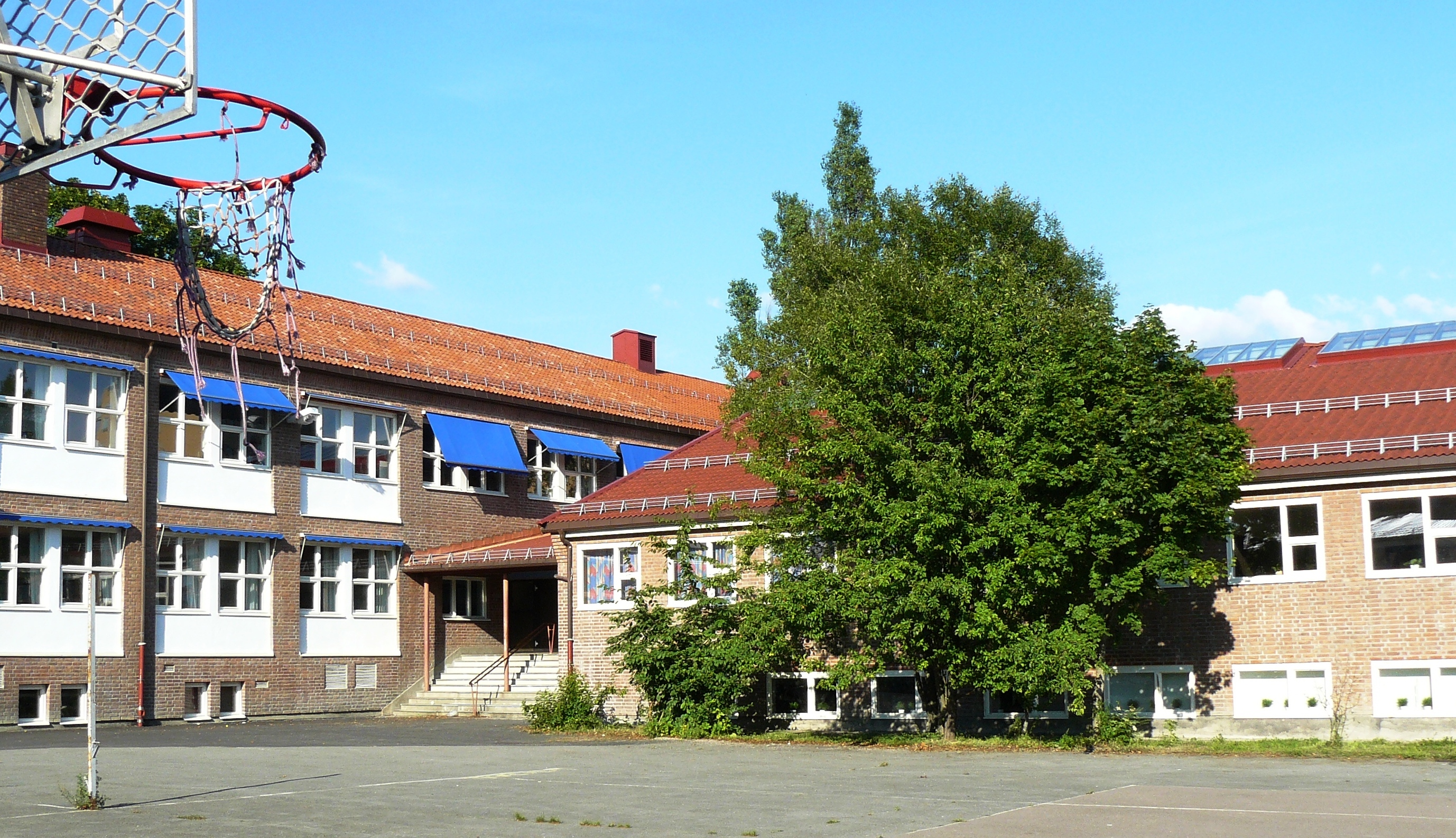
Årvoll School

Årvoll is a residential community situated in the Bjerke district of Oslo, Norway. It was here that anti-Nazi activists Viggo Hansteen and Rolf Wickstrøm – the first two Norwegians to be executed by the Nazis during the five-year German occupation of Norway – lost their lives on 10 September 1941.

== History ==
Årvoll takes its name from the ancient Årvoll farm dating back to 1350, which still stands in the centre of today's community. During the Nazi occupation of Norway in the Second World War, a state of emergency was declared in Oslo by the German occupation authorities due to the Milk strike. During this, Viggo Hansteen and Rolf Wickstrøm, whom were vocally anti-Nazi, were arrested and found guilty before a Nazi tribunal. They were both executed by firing squad in Årvoll as the first Norwegians to be executed by the Nazis. After the war, a memorial to them was erected in 1955 on the place where they were shot.

== Buildings and amenities ==
Årvoll is made up of a mix of four-floor apartment buildings, terraced housing, and maisonettes. It has a small shopping center containing a post office, doctors' offices, pharmacy, grocery, florist, and a small café. There is extensive access to public transportation, and the center of Oslo can be reached in 15 minutes or less by bus, tram, or bicycle.

The community's children attend Årvoll School, which was opened in 1955. Tonsen Church is located in Årvoll. The local multi-sports team is Årvoll IL.
