= Albert Raaen =

Norwegian politician (1887–1971)

Albert Bernhard Raaen (30 September 1887 – 17 October 1971) was a Norwegian trade unionist and politician for the Labour Party.

He took non-commissioned officer training in 1908, commerce school in 1910 and an evening school for socialists in 1913–1914. He became organized in the trade union Union of Employees in Commerce and Offices in 1916, led the Oslo branch from 1920, and from 1927 he chaired the Union of Employees in Commerce and Offices nationwide. He also sat in the secretariat of the Norwegian Confederation of Trade Unions from 1934.

He was a deputy member of Oslo city council from 1917 to 1919 and 1926 to 1928. In the 1936 election he became fifth deputy to the Parliament of Norway from Oslo. From 1936 to 1939 he chaired the Norwegian Support Committee for Spain, and when the Norwegian People's Aid was established as a successor of the Spain Committee in 1939 he became its chairman.

In 1940, when the Second World War reached Norway with a German occupation, Raaen spoke out for "an active and honest cooperation with the authorities". He then became unpopular with the resistance part of the trade unions. In September 1940 he invited Nazi Birger Meidell to the national convention of the Norwegian People's Aid. For this he was removed as chairman, despite that Meidell did not show. He was later viewed with suspicion by the anti-Nazi part of the labour movement. This was not changed even as he was arrested following the milk strike and incarcerated in Grini concentration camp. He was imprisoned from 10 September 1941 to 19 February 1942. After the Second World War he was not re-installed as leader of the Union of Employees in Commerce and Offices, officially for health reasons.

He died in October 1971, and was buried at Vestre gravlund.

Non-profit organization positions
Preceded by position created	Chairman of Norwegian People's Aid; 1939–1940	Succeeded by Andreas Diesen
