= Erling Olsen =

Erling Olsen may refer to:

- Erling Olsen (politician), Danish
- Erling Olsen (trade unionist), Norwegian
