= Per Lie =

Norwegian resistance member

Per Lie (20 May 1907 – 5 March 1945) was a Norwegian labour activist who was imprisoned and killed during the occupation of Norway by Nazi Germany.

He was born in Kristiania as the son of Andreas Lie and his wife Karen, née Gunnarsrud. He was the younger brother of known politician Haakon Lie. The family was poor and, until 1916, his father had to work 112 hours a week. With his parents, two brothers, and two sisters, he shared one room and a kitchen. Per Lie married in 1943, and had one child. The family settled in Aker.

Lie, having middle school as his highest education, worked as a secretary then World War II broke out. When German occupation of Norway, he involved himself in resistance work. He helped print and spread the illegal laborers' publication Fri Fagbevegelse, and assisted people who fled the country. He was arrested in February 1942, and imprisoned at Møllergata 19. After nine months he was transferred to Grini and later to a German Nacht und Nebel camp in February 1943. He eventually wound up at Dachau, where he died in March 1945 from typhoid fever.
