= Parelius Mentsen =

Norwegian trade unionist

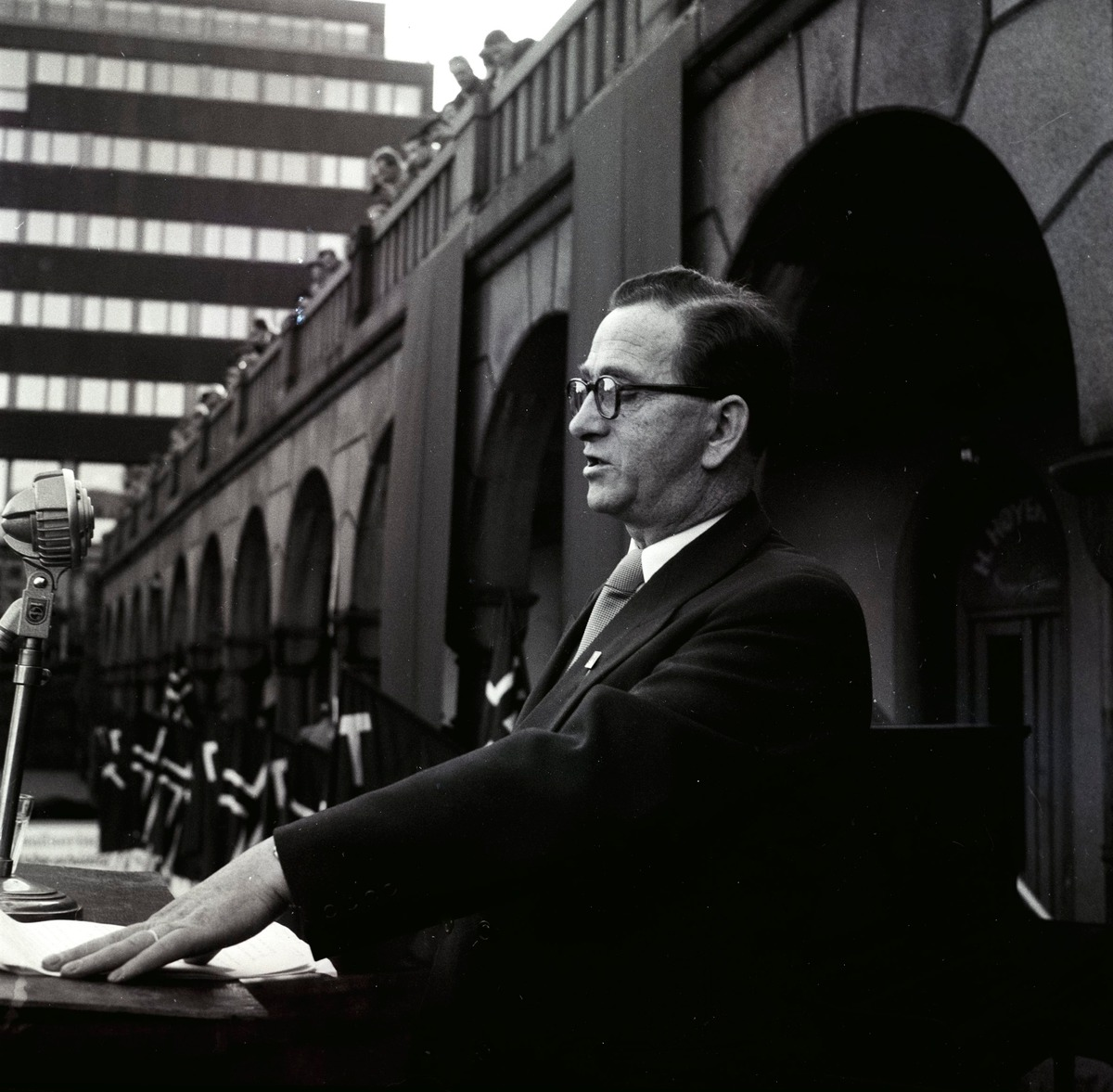
Parelius speaks on International Workers' Day at Youngstorget in Oslo on May 1, 1955.

Parelius Meyer Mentsen (1 October 1902 – 22 April 1985) was a Norwegian trade unionist, who served as leader of the Norwegian Confederation of Trade Unions (LO) from 1965 to 1969.

Mentsen was born in Ballangen Municipality in Ofoten, Norway. He was a timberer by education and occupation, but soon joined trade union and the Norwegian Labour Party in Narvik. He became secretary of the trade union (Samorg) in Finmark in 1936 and worked at the Tromsø office of Confederation of Trade Unions from 1940. In 1946 he was elected secretary of the Confederation of Trade Unions with office in Oslo.

He became the deputy leader of the Confederation of Trade Unions from 1950 to 1965 and leader from 1965 to 1969. He was elected leader as a compromise candidate after Konrad Nordahl and only served one term. During his time, the trade union made a collective home insurance contract available for members.

Trade union offices
Preceded by Konrad Nordahl	Leader of the Norwegian Confederation of Trade Unions; 1965–1969	Succeeded by Tor Aspengren
