= Aero Holland =

Airline from the Netherlands

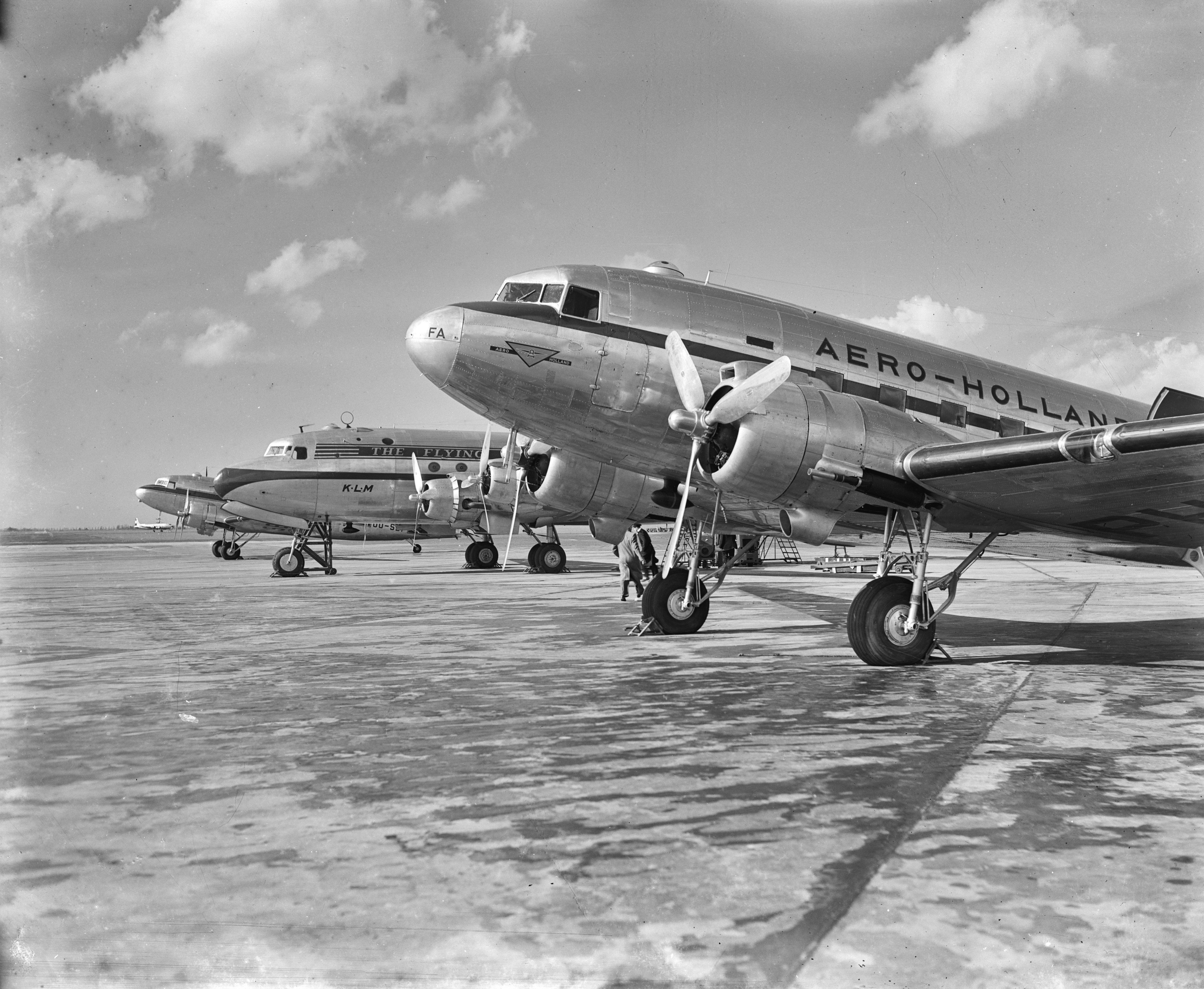
- Aero-Holland Douglas DC-3 in 1948
IATA	ICAO	Call sign
̵	̵	̵
- Founded: 1948
- Ceased operations: 1953
- Fleet size: 3 ̵ Douglas DC-3

Aero Holland was an airline from the Netherlands. It started operations in 1949 and ceased in 1953. On 20 November 1949, 34 people were killed in the Hurum air disaster when an Aero Holland Douglas DC-3 crashed at Hurum, Norway, with only one survivor.
