= Hans Aas =

Norwegian politician and unionist (1880–1960)

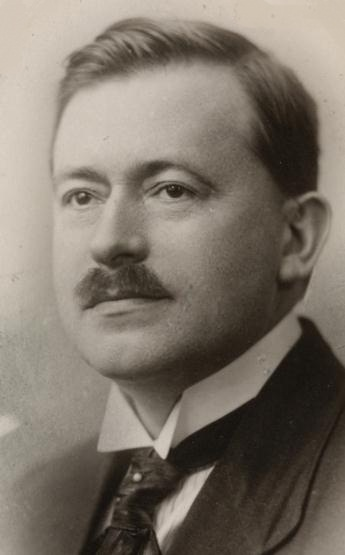
- Born: September 22, 1880; Tromsø, Norway
- Died: August 5, 1960 (aged 79)
- Occupation: Trade unionist
- Known for: Chairman of Norsk bokbinder- og kartonnasjearbeiderforbund (1914–1930), Member of Norwegian Confederation of Trade Unions Secretariat (1920–1923, 1927–1929)
- Office: Member of Aker municipal council
- Other political affiliations: Communist Party Politburo member

Hans Aas (22 September 1880 – 5 August 1960) was a Norwegian trade unionist.

Aas was born in Tromsø. He joined his first trade union in 1906, and chaired the union Norsk bokbinder- og kartonnasjearbeiderforbund from 1914 to 1930. Having broken away from the Labour Party and joined the Communist Party in 1923, Aas later worked as a manager in the newspaper Arbeidet. He was a member of the secretariat of the Norwegian Confederation of Trade Unions from 1920 to 1923, then a deputy who met regularly in the place of Ole O. Lian, then a secretariat member again from 1927 to 1929. He formed a Communist minority in the secretariat together with Elias Volan, but they were replaced in 1929.

In politics, Aas was a member of Aker municipal council and chairman of Grorud district branch of the Labour Party. In the Communist Party, he was a member of the politburo for a period. Aas was also a driving force in Arbeidernes Esperantoforbund. He died in 1960.
