= Tor Halvorsen =

Norwegian trade unionist and politician

Leader of the Norwegian Confederation of Trade Unions
- In office 1977 – 4 November 1987
- Preceded by: Tor Aspengren
- Succeeded by: Leif Haraldseth

Minister of Social Affairs
- In office 12 July 1974 – 15 January 1976
- Prime Minister: Trygve Bratteli
- Preceded by: Sonja Ludvigsen
- Succeeded by: Ruth Ryste

Minister of the Environment
- In office 16 October 1973 – 6 September 1974
- Prime Minister: Trygve Bratteli
- Preceded by: Helga Gitmark
- Succeeded by: Gro Harlem Brundtland

Personal details
- Born: 24 November 1930 Skien, Norway
- Died: 4 November 1987 (aged 56)
- Party: Labour

Tor Halvorsen (24 November 1930 – 4 November 1987) was a Norwegian trade unionist and politician for the Labour Party.

== Biography ==
He was born in Skien. He started his working career in a shoe factory in 1946. In 1952 he was hired as a plumber in Porsgrunn. He then head the trade union of Norsk Hydro at Herøya from 1961 to 1968. He was a district secretary in Arbeidernes Opplysningsforbund from 1968 to 1969, and then a secretary of the Norwegian Confederation of Trade Unions, a position he held from 1969 to 1973 and 1976 to 1977.

He served as a deputy representative to the Parliament of Norway from Telemark during the term 1969–1973. He was a member of Skien city council from 1963 to 1971, and chaired the local Labour Party chapter from 1969 to 1971. In 1973 he was named Minister of the Environment in Bratteli's Second Cabinet. During a cabinet reshuffle in 1974 he became Minister of Social Affairs, first acting from April, then permanently from September. He replaced the deceased Sonja Ludvigsen, and in August 1974 the newspaper Verdens Gang wrote, wrongly, that the "only thing which can be said to be certain now, is that the new Minister of Social Affairs will be a woman". Halvorsen sat throughout the time of Bratteli's Second Cabinet, to 1976. In 1977 he became leader of the Confederation of Trade Unions, a position he kept until his death in 1987. At the same time he was a member of the Labour Party central board from 1977 to 1987.

Halvorsen was chairman of Norsk Arbeiderpresse for some time, and deputy chairman of Rikshospitalet from 1981 to 1987. He was a board member of Norsk Medisinaldepot from 1977 to 1987 and 1980 to 1987, of Folketrygdfondet from 1978 to 1987, the Norwegian Industrial Bank from 1980 to 1981 and Norsk Folkeferie, Strømmens Verksted and Samvirke forsikring. He was a deputy board member of the Norwegian Directorate of Labour from 1971 to 1973 and a deputy member of NTNF from 1972 to 1976.

Political offices
Preceded by Helga Gitmark	Norwegian Minister of the Environment; 1973–1974	Succeeded by Gro Harlem Brundtland
Preceded by Sonja Ludvigsen	Norwegian Minister of Social Affairs; 1974–1976	Succeeded by Ruth Ryste
Trade union offices
Preceded by Tor Aspengren	Leader of the Norwegian Confederation of Trade Unions; 1977–1987	Succeeded by Leif Haraldseth
