= Hurum air disaster =

1949 aviation accident

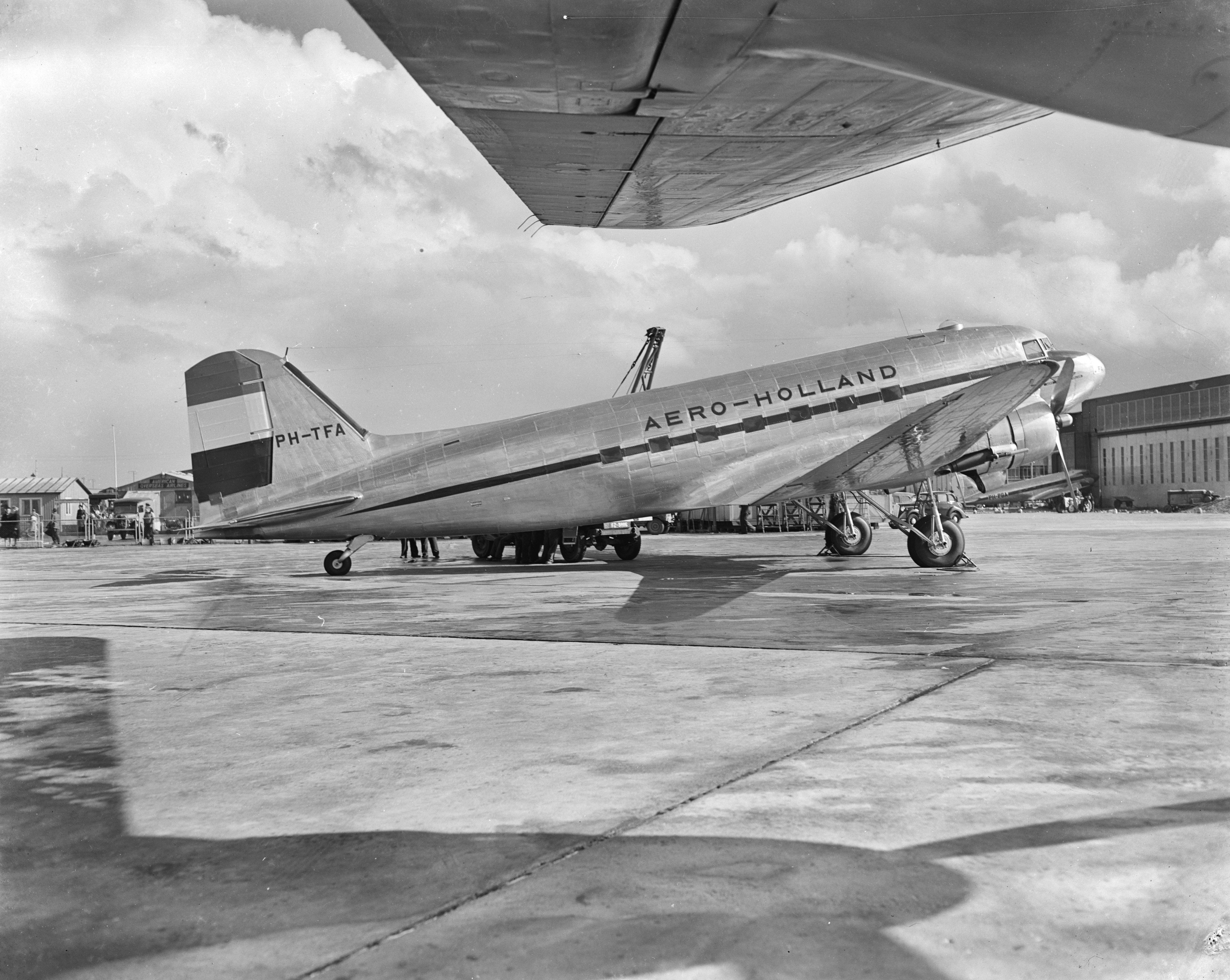
- PH-TFA, the aircraft involved in the crash, pictured in 1948

Accident
- Date: 20 November 1949
- Summary: Controlled flight into terrain in heavy fog
- Site: Hurum, Norway; 59.6200447°N 10.5724422°E

Aircraft
- Aircraft type: Douglas DC-3 (C-47A-25-DK)
- Operator: Aero Holland
- Registration: PH-TFA
- Flight origin: An unknown airport near Tunisia
- Stopover: Brussels Airport
- Destination: Oslo Airport
- Passengers: 31
- Crew: 4
- Fatalities: 34
- Injuries: 1
- Survivors: 1

The Hurum air disaster was an Aero Holland plane crash in Hurum southwest of Oslo, Norway when a Douglas DC-3 which was carrying Jewish children from Tunisia who were to transit through Norway while immigrating to Israel crashed as it was approaching Fornebu Airport on 20 November 1949, killing 34 people, including 27 children.

== Background ==
In 1949, the American Jewish Joint Distribution Committee signed an agreement with the Norwegian Ministry of Welfare under which 200 places in a sanitarium for tuberculosis patients was to be evacuated so as to be made available for Jewish children from North Africa in the process of immigrating to the newly independent state of Israel. In April 1949, about 200 children from Morocco transited through the facility on their way to Israel, and this was to be followed by a group of Tunisian Jewish children.

In Tunisia, which was then a protectorate of France, Youth Aliyah emissaries had arrived after Israeli independence in 1948, and with the consent of the French authorities, selected children for immigration to Israel with the consent of their parents. Most of these children were from poor families.

On 20 November 1949, two DC-3 planes of the Aero Holland company took off from an airport near Tunis. One made it safely to its destination. The other plane, with the registration PH-TFA, stopped at Brussels-Zaventem Airport to repair the radio before setting off for Oslo. On board that plane were 28 children, most of them 8 to 12 years old, and seven escorts and crew.

== The crash ==
Itzhak Alal, sole survivor of the crash

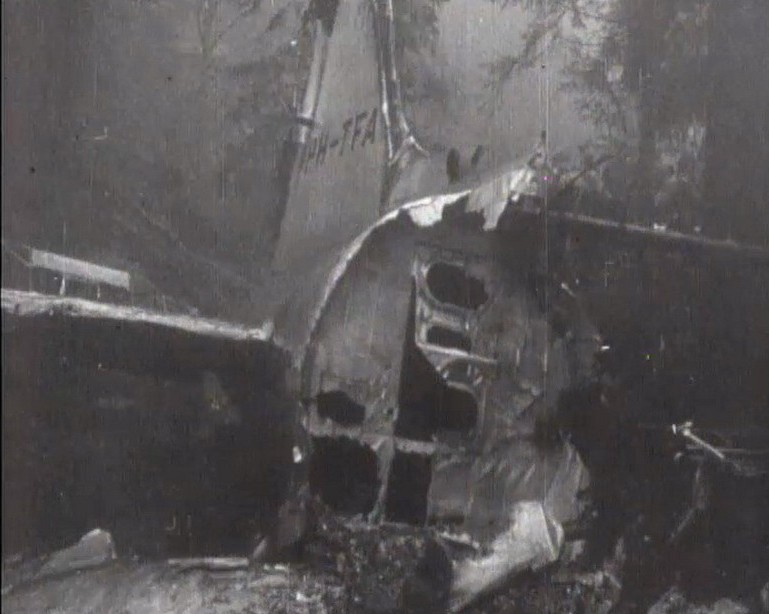
Wreckage of the plane

As the DC-3 approached Oslo, the pilot encountered heavy fog, and lowered the plane while still in mountainous terrain. Near Hurum, one of the plane's wings hit a tree. The plane continued another 60 meters and crashed into a mountain at 16:56. The force of the collision overturned the plane, blew most of the passengers out, and ignited the fuel tanks, causing the front of the plane to burst into flames. Of the 35 people on board, 34 were killed. The only survivor was a 12-year-old boy, Itzhak Allal, who later changed his name to El Al.

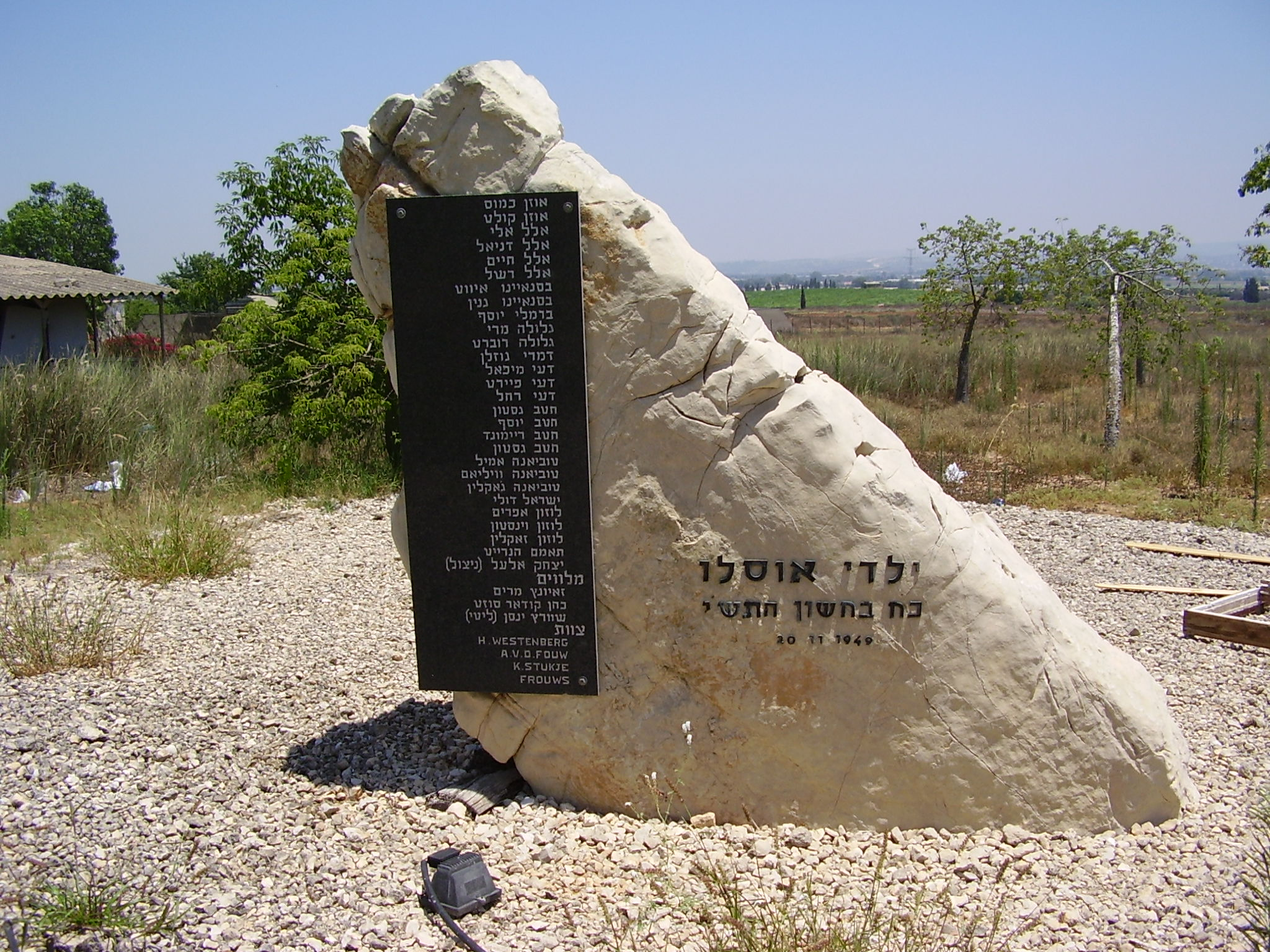
The children's memorial at Yanuv

At midnight, Norwegian radio announced that contact with the plane had been lost and asked for the public's help in locating it. A search operation was initiated, and on 22 November, after 42 hours of searching, the wreckage and bodies were found. Allal was found, having survived the crash and freezing temperatures.

The crash was the second deadliest air disaster in Norway at that time, exceeded only by the 35 deaths in the 1947 Kvitbjørn disaster. Public sympathy ran high, and the secretary of the Norwegian Labor Party, Håkon Lie started a fundraiser to build a Norwegian village in Israel. The funds were used in helping build the moshav Yanuv.

A memorial to the victims has been raised at the crash site. It is symbolically fenced and decorated with Stars of David. Parts of the wreckage are also at the memorial. In Israel, a memorial to the victims was built in Yanuv. Friends of Israel in the Norwegian Labour Movement (Norwegian: Venner av Israel i Norsk Arbeiderbevegelse) raised money for it to be built. Memorials also exist in Netivot, and Netanya, and a kindergarten in Netanya is named for the children of Oslo.

== See also ==
- Aviation in Norway
- Egoz, a ship that sank in 1961 while carrying Moroccan Jews
- List of aviation accidents and incidents with a sole survivor
