= Elias Volan =

Norwegian trade unionist (1887–1974)

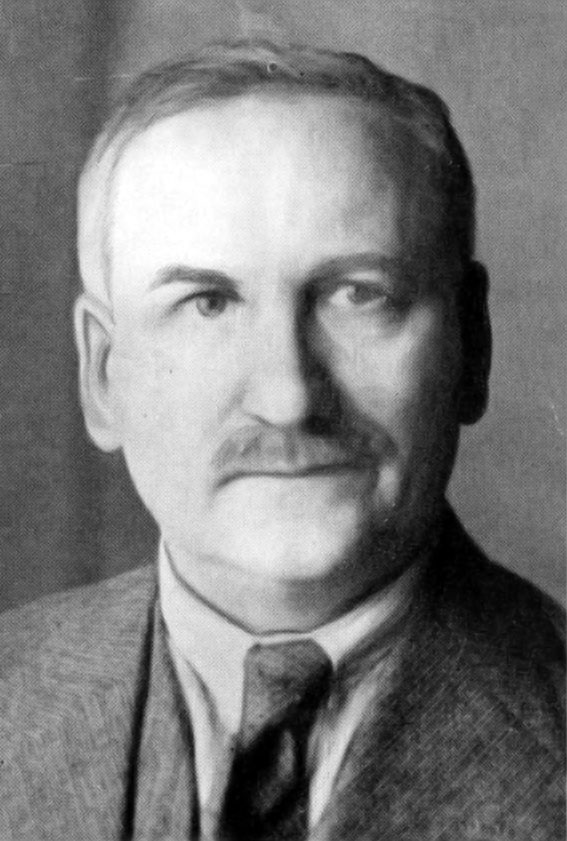
Elias Volan

Elias Karelius Johansen Volan (10 March 1887 – 26 December 1974) was a Norwegian trade unionist.

He was born in Inderøy Municipality as a son of crofter Johan Berent Johannessen Volvollan and Lise Eliasdatter Kjærbo. He attended Sund Folk High School from 1903 to 1904, but spent the rest of his youth as a worker. In 1908 he became chairman of his local trade union. He became a Norwegian Union of General Workers unionist in Trondheim, and became a national board member in 1913. He was also a member of the Dutch Radicals (refer to Fagopposisjonen av 1911), and through his fellow adherents (spearheaded by Martin Tranmæl) he was elected chairman of the Norwegian Union of General Workers in 1918 and deputy chairman of the Norwegian Confederation of Trade Unions in 1920. In 1923 he went on to become chairman of the newly created Norwegian Union of Building Workers.

He was active in the Norwegian Labour Party, but when the party split in 1923 he joined the Communist Party of Norway. He was a central board member from 1923 to 1929 and politburo member from 1925 to 1929. Because of this he was removed as Norwegian Union of Building Workers leader in 1927, and instead became head of trade matters in the Communist Party of Norway. In 1929 he was also removed as member of the Confederation of Trade Unions secretariat together with Hans Aas. He chaired the party Arbeiderklassens Samlingsparti in 1927, but it was very short-lived. He left the Communist Party in 1929, and rejoined the Labour Party. He was secretary of the Confederation of Trade Unions from 1931 to 1934, when he was again removed. He instead became Confederation of Trade Unions secretary for Northern Norway in 1935, where he mainly travelled around and founded trade unions. In 1938 he returned as national secretary. He was married to Olufine Mathilde Vinje (1885–1953) from June 1909 to 1938, and then to Astrid Evensen (1890–1958) from July 1938.

After the German invasion of Norway in 1940, the leadership of the Confederation of Trade Unions fled together with the royal family and government. Volan became acting leader from 13 April 1940. On 14 April he co-signed a petition to the people to remain calm under the new German rule (following the Lysaker Bridge sabotage). Volan was a member of the Nemnda for industri og omsetning, and participated in negotiations during the summer. Many trade unionists disliked his role. Nonetheless, he was removed by Germans in September 1940. Jens Tangen from Fagopposisjonen av 1940 was ordered by Germans to take over. Volan fled to Sweden, where he worked for the exiled part of the Confederation of Trade Unions. He was a Communist Party member for a brief time, but joined the Labour Party for the third time before 1945.

After the war, he was not sanctioned for the time as trade union leader in occupied Norway. He continued as union secretary until retirement in 1953, being re-elected in 1946 and 1949. He was a member of the Labour Court of Norway from 1954 to 1957. He died in December 1974 in Oslo.
