= Arbeiderklassens Samlingsparti =

Political Party contested the 1927 Norwegian Parliamentary Election

- Leader: Elias Volan
- Founded: 1927
- Newspaper: Norges Kommunistblad
- Ideology: Communism
- Political position: far-left

Arbeiderklassens Samlingsparti (lit. "Unified Party of the Working Class") was a short-lived political party in Norway.

== Establishment ==
It was a part of the tendency of unification among the workers' parties in Norway. From the Norwegian Labour Party, two splits had occurred: the Social Democratic Labour Party in 1921 and the Communist Party in 1923. The first two had wanted to unify for many years, and the Communist Party also wanted in, in order to not become isolated. In 1926–1927 a committee set up a program which had to be ratified at a unifying congress.

As it happened, there were two unifying congresses in January 1927: one where Labour and Social Democratic Labour united once and for all with support from the Norwegian Confederation of Trade Unions, and one where Arbeiderklassens Samlingsparti was founded. Behind this party was the Communist Party, who mainly opposed a full unification of the parties, but supported an umbrella model ("the Labour Party model"). Erling Falk and Mot Dag/Arbeideropposisjonen, who had formerly been excluded from the Labour Party, were also behind this policy. Some Communists who wanted a full unification; including Sverre Støstad, Fredrik Monsen and Olav Larssen, were excluded shortly before the congresses.

839 people, whose selection was based on their support of the committee program, travelled to the Labour/Social Democratic congress. About 400 others, of which 159 trade unionists, were selected by different bodies on a "free basis", which mainly meant that they supported the Communist tactics. They gathered in Idrettens Hus on 29 January 1927. Once there, the 400 formed a deputation, headed by Elias Volan, who was sent to speak at the largest congress. A vote at the largest congress decided that the 400 would not be let in, and thus they went on with a separate congress where Arbeiderklassens Samlingsparti was founded. The party name was chosen on 1 February 1927. The reason why a political party was formed, even though the Communists only wanted a cooperative body, was the nature of Norwegian election laws. Elias Volan was elected chairman, and Emil Stang, Jr. was elected deputy chairman. The party used the newspaper Norges Kommunistblad as a means of communication; for instance the party's by-laws were printed there on 22 February.

== Election ==
The party contested the 1927 Norwegian parliamentary election. In Finnmark and Troms the party fielded as Arbeiderklassens Samlingsparti, in the latter county with Sigurd Simensen as the first candidate. In Hedmark, Oppland, Telemark, Sør-Trøndelag, Nord-Trøndelag, the party fielded as Arbeiderklassens Samlingsparti/Norges Kommunistiske Parti. In Akershus, Buskerud, Hordaland and Nordland the party fielded as Norges Kommunistiske Parti/Arbeiderklassens Samlingsparti.

== Demise ==
The party then disappeared "in silence" around New Years' 1927–1928. The election was highly unsuccessful for the party. Another reason for its disappearance was that one of their main goals were fulfilled, as the Confederation of Trade Unions at its autumn congress declined to enter the International Federation of Trade Unions. The Communist Party continued on its own, and those who belonged to Mot Dag were party members until 1928, when the organization collectively exited the Communist Party.
