= Tonsenhagen =

Neighborhood in Oslo

Coordinates: 59°56′51.08″N 10°49′30.65″E

Tonsenhagen is a neighborhood in the borough of Bjerke in northeast Oslo, Norway. Built in the 1950s, it was one of the early new suburbs within Oslo.

The neighborhood is situated on a hillside overlooking Oslo and the Grorud Valley, surrounded by forest and near the ski resort of Grefsenkollen. There is a local school, for which the first headmaster was Rolf Ridar, and the Norwegian children's play and book writer Ingebrigt Davik was once a teacher there.

== Street names ==
The main road through the area is named after the first female member of parliament, Anna Rogstad, who was also a teacher and an early Norwegian suffragette. The uppermost road on the hill (with three yellow blocks of flats) was named after the first female professor of Oslo University in 1912, Kristine Bonnevie, whilst another main road was named after the teacher and feminist Ragna Nielsen. The Selvbyggerveien (Self Builders Road) was named for the block of flats built by the housing cooperative Byggelag.
