= Arbeidernes Esperantoforbund =

Arbeidernes Esperantoforbund (Norwegian: Workers' Esperanto Association) was an association in the Norwegian labour movement that worked for the introduction of the Esperanto language.

Arbeidernes Esperantoforbund was established on 30 August 1924. Most members were also members of the Sennacieca Asocio Tutmonda. Hans Aas was a driving force.

At its establishment it was supported verbally by the Labour Party, the Social Democratic Labour Party, the Communist Party and the Norwegian Confederation of Trade Unions. This, writes a historian, was a "rare instance of a unity front" in Norway.

Arbeidernes Esperantoforbund's periodic publication was Arbeider-Esperantisten.
