= Yanuv =

Moshav in central Israel

Yanuv: יָנוּב (Hebrew)
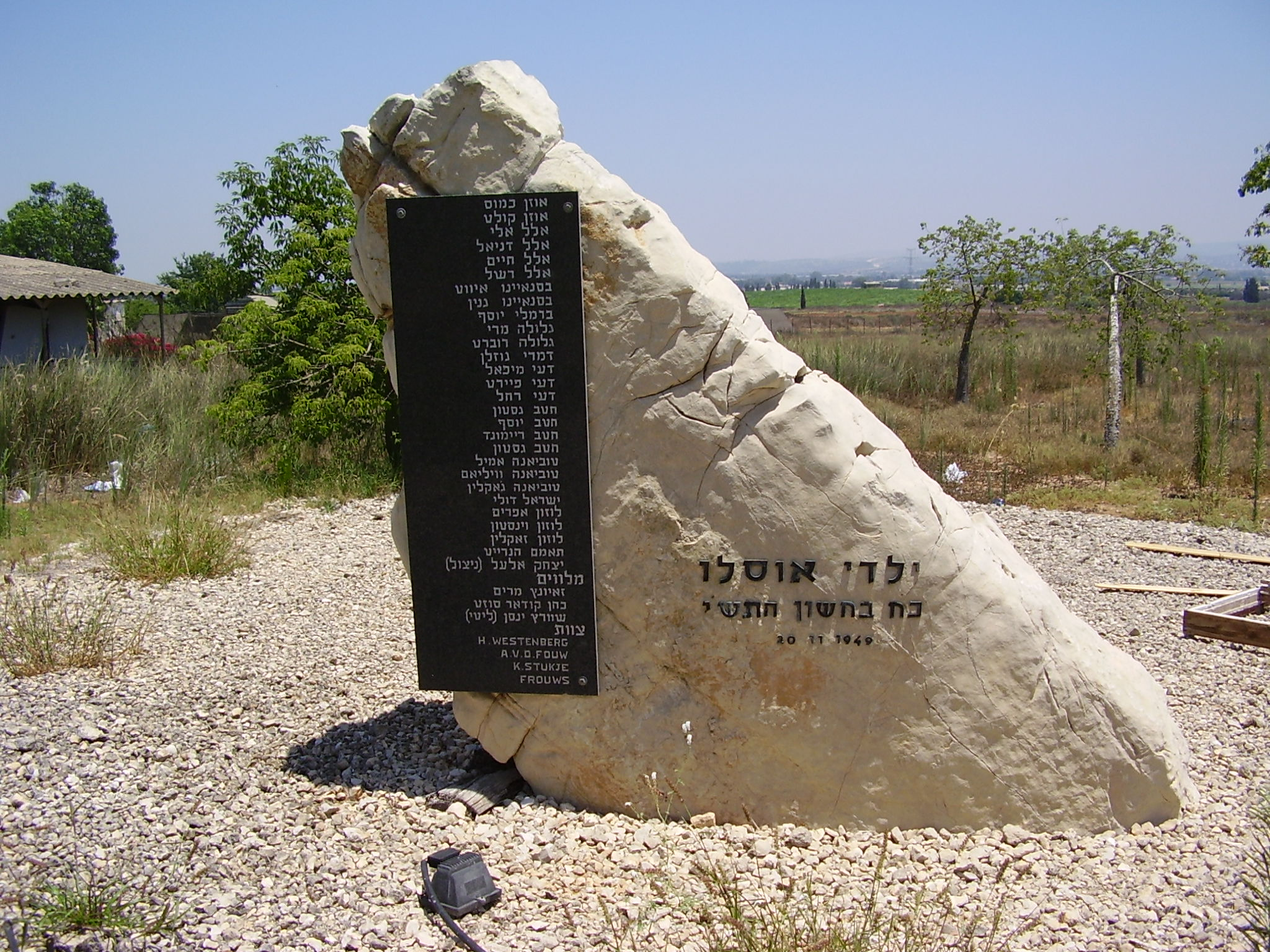
- Yanuv children memorial
- Etymology: [He] will Come Forth
- Location within Central Israel
- Coordinates: 32°18′23″N 34°56′57″E
- Country: Israel
- District: Central
- Subdistrict: HaSharon
- Council: Lev HaSharon
- Affiliation: Moshavim Movement
- Founded: 21 March 1950
- Founder: Tunisian immigrants
- Population (2024): 868

Yanuv (Hebrew: יָנוּב, lit. '[He] will Come Forth') is a moshav in central Israel. Located in the Sharon plain near Netanya and Tulkarm, it falls under the jurisdiction of Lev HaSharon Regional Council. In 2024 it had a population of 868.

== History ==
Before the 20th century the area formed part of the Forest of Sharon. It was an open woodland dominated by Mount Tabor Oak, which extended from Kfar Yona in the north to Ra'anana in the south. The local Arab inhabitants traditionally used the area for pasture, firewood and intermittent cultivation. The intensification of settlement and agriculture in the coastal plain during the 19th century led to deforestation and subsequent environmental degradation.

The village was founded on 21 March 1950 by a kvutza of immigrants from Tunisia on land which had been owned by a Nabulsi effendi prior to the 1948 Arab–Israeli War. Its name was taken from Proverbs 10:31: "From the mouth of the just will come forth wisdom".

Part of the village's homes were built with Norwegian funds, following the Hurum air disaster, in which over two dozen Jewish children on their way to Israel died. The sole survivor of the disaster settled in Yanuv, as did some of the families of victims that later immigrated to Israel. A memorial was later created, funded by the friendship association Friends of Israel in the Norwegian Labour Movement (Norwegian: Venner av Israel i Norsk Arbeiderbevegelse).

== Notable residents ==
- Lonah Chemtai Salpeter (born 1988), Kenyan-born Israeli Olympic marathon runner
