= Fagopposisjonen av 1940 =

1940 group of Norwegian trade unionists

Fagopposisjonen av 1940 (Trade Opposition of 1940) was a grouping among Norwegian trade unionists in 1940, after the German invasion of Norway.

It had roots in a 1930s informal oppositional group within the Norwegian labour movement. The informal group was led by Håkon Meyer, and was more radical than the mainstream labour movement. On 9 April 1940 Germany invaded Norway, and subsequently occupied the country. The mainstream labour movement was now engaged in fighting and opposing a German rule. However, the grouping around Håkon Meyer wanted to steer the labour movement in another direction; taking advantage of the occupation to make conditions for laborers more favourable. The grouping was soon supported by some members of the radical Communist Party of Norway, and by non-partisan trade unionists such as Halvard Olsen.

Fagopposisjonen av 1940 was founded as a formal group on 15 June 1940. Meyer and Olsen were leading figures, Jens Tangen headed the executive committee. The other members of the executive committee were Meyer, H. Olsen, Erling Olsen, Martin Brendberg, Adelstein Haugen and Albert Johannessen. It was staunchly opposed by the Norwegian Confederation of Trade Unions (LO) and official organs of the labour movement; LO officially denounced Fagopposisjonen av 1940 as "underminers" on 26 July.

Around August–September the group was split in two. One part, led by Håkon Meyer, started accepting the Norwegian Fascist party Nasjonal Samling (who had taken power for a few days in April) as a cooperation partner. The other part disassociated itself with the Nazi rule. In late September Fagopposisjonen managed to have the German powerholders remove acting leader of the Confederation of Trade Unions, Elias Volan. Jens Tangen was installed as leader. Erling Olsen became secretary. Both Tangen, Meyer, H. Olsen, E. Olsen and Kåre Rein came to hold leading positions in the Confederation of Trade Unions in the next years.
