= Ruth Ryste =

Norwegian trade unionist and politician (1932–2023)

- Born: 24 July 1932; Bamble Municipality, Norway
- Died: 21 September 2023 (aged 91)

Ruth Anlaug Ryste (24 July 1932 – 21 September 2023) was a Norwegian trade unionist and politician for the Labour Party.

Ryste was born in Bamble Municipality. She finished commerce school in 1950, and from 1950 to 1970 she worked with welfare in Bamble Municipality. She was a deputy member of the municipal council of Bamble Municipality from 1967 to 1971. From 1970 to 1973 she was a secretary in the trade union Norwegian Civil Service Union, and also supervisory board member of the Norwegian Confederation of Trade Unions from 1969 to 1975. She was a personal secretary to the Minister of Administration and Consumer Affairs from 1 January 1973 to 1 January 1974, and from 1975 to 1976 she was a secretary in Statstjenestemannskartellet.

From 1976 to 1979 she served as the Minister of Social Affairs in Nordli's Cabinet. During her tenure, the government notably passed legislation allowing self-determined abortion.

She was a member of the Labour Party central board from 1975 to 1981. In 1979 she left the Minister position to become director of the Norwegian Refugee Council. From 1982 to 1987 she headed Statens flyktningssekretariat, and from 1988 to 1995 she was an adviser in the Ministry of Local Government. She was a board member of Nationaltheatret from 1975 to 1982 and a member of Norway's Contact Committee for Immigrants and the Authorities from 1984 to 1987. Many years after retiring she was elected to Porsgrunn city council for the term 2007 to 2011.

Sie died on 21 September 2023, at the age of 91.

Political offices
Preceded by Tor Halvorsen	Norwegian Minister of Social Affairs; 1976–1979	Succeeded by Arne Nilsen
