= Josef Larsson =

Norwegian metal worker and trade unionist

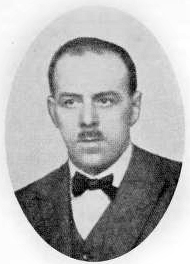
- Born: 12 October 1893; Karlstad, Sweden
- Died: 27 December 1987 (aged 94)
- Occupations: Trade unionist and politician
- Children: Two sons

Josef Larsson (12 October 1893 - 27 December 1987) was a Norwegian metal worker and trade unionist, born in Sweden. From 1931 he was a secretary for the Norwegian Union of Iron and Metalworkers. He was a board member of the Norwegian Labour Party from 1927 to 1930.

In 1941, after the so-called milk strike in Oslo, Larsson was sentenced to death in a German court-martial, but his conviction was changed to imprisonment for life.

He spent the rest of the war years in German jails. After the war he took up again the position as chairman of the Norwegian Union of Iron and Metalworkers, a post he held until 1958.

== Early and personal life ==
Larsson was born in Karlstad to carpenter Karl Larsson and Elise Jansson, and married Ragnhild Karlsson in 1922.

Larsson died in 1987 at 94 years of age.

External image
- Larsson (middle) with Konrad Nordahl (right) and Karsten Torkildsen.
