= Norwegian Union of Railway Workers =

Trade union in Norway

- Norsk Jernbaneforbund
- Founded: 20 November 1892
- Headquarters: Oslo, Norway
- Location: Norway
- Affiliations: LO
- Website: njf.no

The Norwegian Union of Railway Workers (Norwegian: Norsk Jernbaneforbund, NJF) is a trade union in Norway. It was formed on 20 November 1892, and mainly organizes workers in Norges Statsbaner—with the exception of locomotive drivers— and the Norwegian National Rail Administration, including related companies such as BaneTele, Nettbuss, Nettlast, Malmtrafik, MiTrans, Mantena, Trafikkservice, CargoNet, Baneservice, Arrive, Ofotbanen AS, NSB Gjøvikbanen and Flytoget.

It is affiliated with the Norwegian Confederation of Trade Unions (LO), and is a member of the International Transport Workers' Federation.

Former leaders include Ludvik Buland and John Marius Trana.
