= Rolf Wickstrøm =

Norwegian labour activist (1912-1941)

Rolf Wickstrøm (9 December 1912 in Oslo, Norway – 10 September 1941) was a Norwegian labour activist and a victim of the German occupation of Norway during World War II.

Wickstrøm grew up in a working-class family. In 1935 he was hired as a welder on the rapidly expanding Skabo Jernbanevognfabrikk, the Skabo Rail Coach Factory. Dating from January 1940, he was labour representative and shop stewart at Skabo. He was arrested at Møllergata 19 in Oslo from 2 May to 26 May 1941.

Wickstrøm was executed during the state of martial law which followed the so-called milk strike (Melkestreiken), together with the labour lawyer Viggo Hansteen. The reason for the strike was that food supplies had become increasingly worse by September 1941. These two were the first labour representatives to be executed during the German occupation, and as such gained a great symbolic value for the continued resistance. Wickstrøm left behind his wife Signe (1913-1996) and son Tore (born 1938). After the war, Hansteen and Rolf Wickstrøm were buried in Vår Frelsers gravlund.

Viggo Hansteen and Rolf Wickstrøm were honored by the naming of a section of road around Oslo which bears their names. In 1948, a memorial was erected in granite with bronze relief at the site of execution at Årvoll in the Bjerke district of Oslo. The memorial was directed by Norwegian sculptor Nic Schiøll (1901–1984). It bears the following:

Viggo Hansteen, Rolf Wickstrøm. The first victims in Norway's struggle for freedom from 1940-45. Shot by the Germans 10 September 1941.

— Inscription on the Memorial at Østre skytterlags bane

== Other sources ==
- Berntsen, Harald (1995) To liv - én skjebne: Viggo Hansteen og Rolf Wickstrøm (Oslo: Aschehoug) ISBN 82-03-26002-0
- Dahl, Hans Fredrik, ed. (1995). "Wickstrøm, Rolf". Norsk krigsleksikon 1940-45. Oslo: Cappelen. Archived from the original on 2011-05-26.
