= Konrad Nordahl =

Norwegian trade unionist and politician

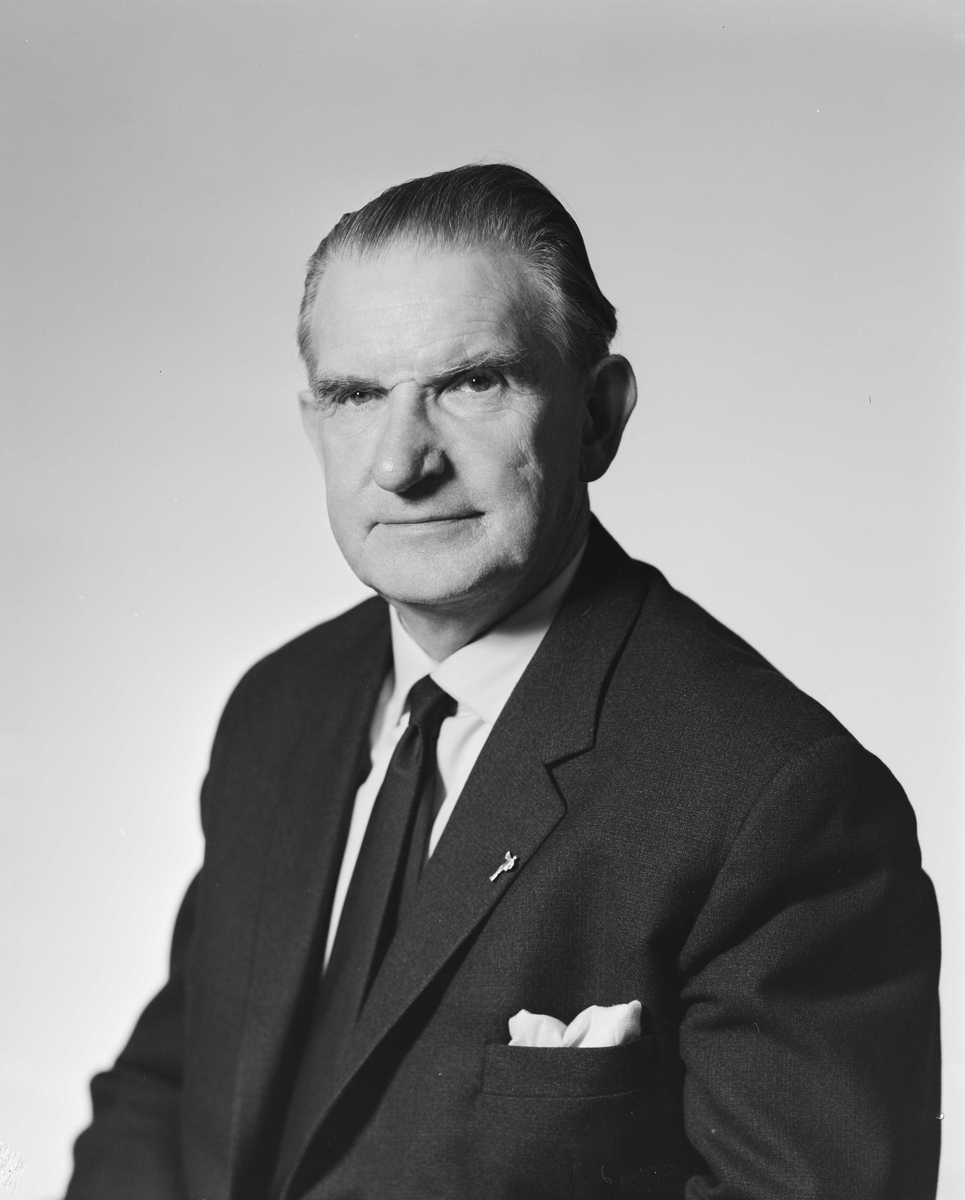
Konrad Nordahl in 1962

Konrad Mathias Nordahl (25 September 1897 – 22 May 1975) was a Norwegian trade unionist and politician for the Labour Party. He was the leader of the Norwegian Confederation of Trade Unions from 1939 to 1965, and an MP from 1958 to 1965.

== Early life ==
He was born in Laksevåg (at that time it was part of Askøy Municipality). At the age of two, he lost his mother and was raised by his uncle and aunt as foster parents; he was then given the surname Nordahl instead of Johannessen. He joined the Norwegian Labour Party in 1912, and a trade union in 1915. He had secretary jobs for the Labour Party and its youth wing, and became a central board member of the Young Communist League of Norway in 1923. In the same year the organization seceded from the Labour Party, and became the young wing of a new Communist Party of Norway. Nordahl was a Communist Party member until 1927, and in 1929 he rejoined the Labour Party.

== Trade union and politics ==
In 1923 Nordahl had married Constance Hole (1897–1986) and moved to Bergen, where he found work in a workshop. He joined the Norwegian Union of Iron and Metal Workers, and became national chairman in 1931. Already in 1934 he became vice chairman of the Norwegian Confederation of Trade Unions. He was promoted to chairman in 1939 when Olav Hindahl became a cabinet member. At the same time he joined the Norwegian Labour Party central board, where he remained until 1965. He was also a member of the executive committee of Oslo city council from 1937 to 1947.

On 9 April 1940 Norway was attacked by Nazi Germany. Hindahl followed the cabinet as they fled the capital. Unlike the cabinet Nordahl did not flee the country in 1940. After protests against the new Nazi authorities Nordahl was arrested in November 1940, but later released. The Confederation of Trade Unions leadership in Norway was filled with other people, perceived as more cooperationist—Nazis were however not installed until November 1941. Nordahl fled to the United Kingdom in September 1941 and established a leadership-in-exile. He was also a board member of Norges Bank-in-exile from 1941 to 1945. He is regarded as the legal Confederation of Trade Unions leader even through the war years. From 1945 to 1965 he was the undisputed leader. In 1945 he attended the World Trade Union Conference in London along with many renowned trade union leaders.

He was also elected twice to the Parliament of Norway, in 1957 and 1961. For both terms he was a member of the Standing Committee on Foreign Affairs and Constitutional Affairs and the Enlarged Committee on Foreign Affairs and Constitutional Affairs.

Nordahl chaired the board of Arbeidernes Opplysningsforbund for some time, and also Norsk Arbeiderpresse from 1948 to 1965 and the Norwegian Industrial Bank from 1936 to 1951 (deputy chair from 1952 to 1969). He was a board member of ILO 1948 to 1951, Kongsberg and Raufoss Industries from 1947 to 1952, Norsk Jernverk 1947 to 1953 (supervisory board member 1959 to 1965), Norsk Hydro from 1963 to 1969 and Foreningen Norden.

According to Dagsavisen commentator and former Labour Party politician Arne Strand, Nordahl was one of the three most powerful politicians in the Norwegian labour movement, and thus also in Norwegian 20th-century politics, together with Einar Gerhardsen and Martin Tranmæl. The newspaper Morgenbladet are among those who has expanded this group somewhat, to include Haakon Lie and Trygve Bratteli as well. Nordahl was pro-EEC and pro-Israel, and was an anti-Communist during the Cold War. He issued several books, including Israel, en demokratisk utpost i Midt-Østen ("Israel, a Democratic Outpost in the Middle East", 1965). In 1991 and 1992 his diaries were published in two volumes. He died in May 1975 in Oslo, his urn interred at Østre gravlund.

Trade union offices
Preceded by Olav Hindahl	Leader of the Norwegian Confederation of Trade Unions; 1939–1965 (disputed by German-installed leaders 1940–1945)	Succeeded by Parelius Mentsen
