= Milk strike =

The milk strike (Norwegian: melkestreiken) was a strike in Nazi-occupied Oslo on 8 and 9 September 1941. It led to strong reprisals from the German occupiers, in the form of martial law, court-martial, mass arrests, two executions and several long-term jail sentences.

== Start ==
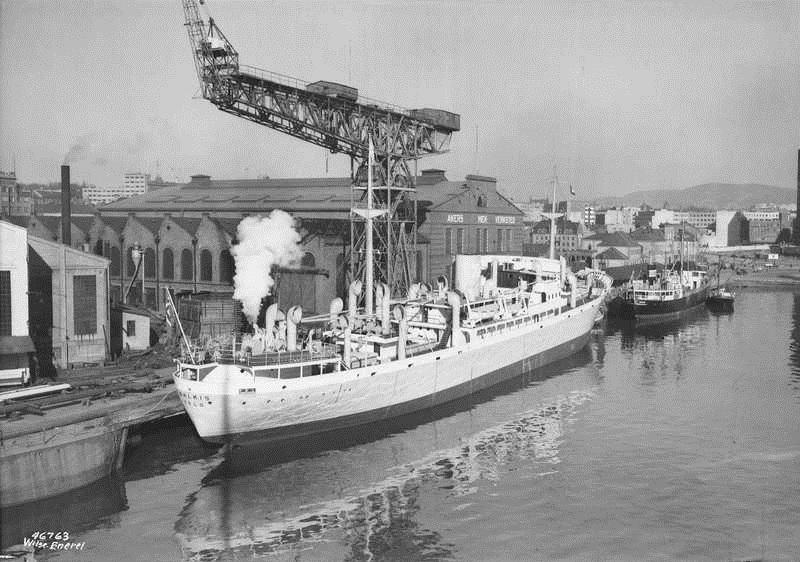
Shipyard Akers mekaniske verksted, where the milk strike began on September 8, 1941.

The strike started among workers at the shipyard Akers mekaniske verksted and the industry site Christiania Spigerverk, as a spontaneous protest against the milk rationing announced on 8 September 1941. The workers lost their daily quota of milk, which had been given to them until then. The protests spread to other companies. On 9 September the number of strikers was estimated to 20-25,000, at around fifty industry sites.

== German reaction ==
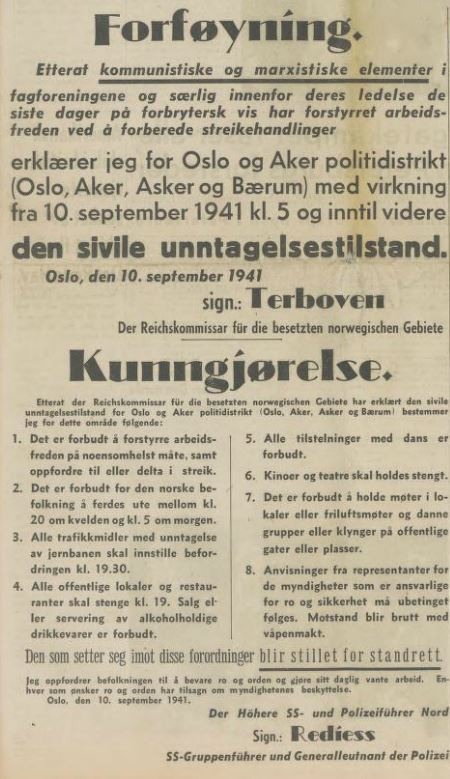
Announcement of a state of emergency in Oslo, Aker, Asker and Bærum, 10 September 1941

On 10 September, the German Reichskommissar Josef Terboven declared martial law in Oslo and the neighboring municipality of Aker. Two union leaders, Viggo Hansteen and Rolf Wickstrøm, were sentenced to death by a court-martial, and immediately executed by an SS Sonderkommando led by Oscar Hans. Later Ludvik Buland, Harry Vestli and Josef Larsson were also sentenced to death, but their convictions were changed to imprisonment for life in German jails. Both Buland and Vestli later died in German prisons. Albert Raaen was arrested.

The arrests had direct consequences for the leadership of the Norwegian Confederation of Trade Unions. Until then the Confederation had had a certain degree of independence with Buland as deputy chairman and Hansteen with a leading role. In May 1941 Håkon Meyer had proposed that in a reorganization of the Confederation, Hansteen would continue his job as legal consultant. After the milk strike the Confederation underwent "Nazification", with members of the Fascist party Nasjonal Samling installed as leaders. Erling Olsen became acting chairman on 10 September, and continued as deputy chairman when Odd Fossum was installed as chairman on 11 September. Kåre Rein was installed as secretary. I. B. Aase continued in his position as treasurer.

New, comissarian leaders of the unions were installed as well. These were Birger Aamodt in the Union of Iron and Metalworkers, Thorvald Apeland in the Union of Food, Beverage and Allied Workers, Michael Berg in the Union of Employees in Commerce and Offices, Nils Bunæs in the Union of General Workers, Petter Holen in the Union of Railway Workers, Rolf H. Jahrmann in the Union of Forestry and Land Workers, Håkon Meyer in the Union of Municipal Employees, Trygve Rokling in the Transport Workers' Union, Aksel Schultz in the Norsk Murerforbund and Karsten Werner in the Norsk Centralforening for Boktrykkere. Borger Haugar led the Union of Clothing Workers. The comissarian leaders were hastily hired, so Haugar and Bunæs were removed after a short time and replaced with "more competent people".

Furthermore, on 11 September, rector of the University of Oslo, Didrik Arup Seip, was dismissed from his position and arrested. Also other University staff, including the professors Anton Wilhelm Brøgger and Otto Lous Mohr, were arrested. On 12 September former Chief of Police in Oslo Kristian Welhaven, and the future Prime Minister Einar Gerhardsen were arrested. Also journalists and newspaper editors, including Olaf Gjerløw and Fredrik Ramm, were arrested. In total around 300 people were arrested during the martial law period, which lasted until 16 September.

A crackdown on certain parts of Norwegian society, especially left-wingers in the trade unions, was in some ways imminent after Operation Barbarossa. The incidents signalled a harder regime from the German occupiers. The executions of Hansteen and Wickstrøm became a lasting symbol for the Norwegian resistance.
