= Bjerke (borough) =

Borough of Oslo, Norway

Coordinates: 59°56′25″N 10°48′50″E

Bydel Bjerke
- Borough
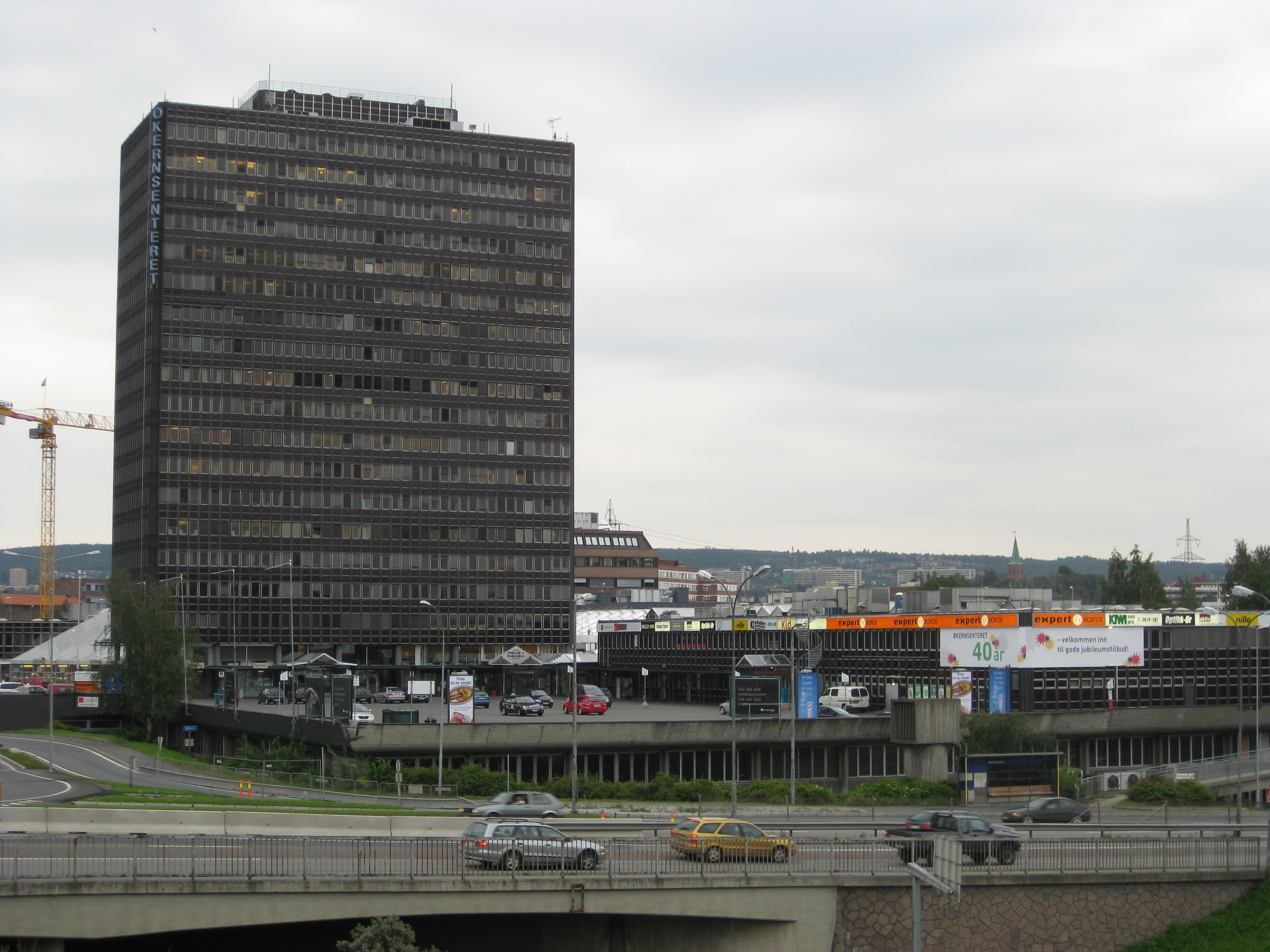

- Coat of arms

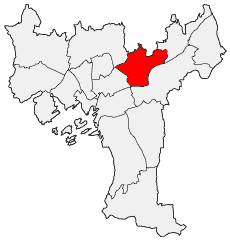
- Country: Norway
- City: Oslo
- District: Grorud Valley

Area
  - Total: 7.72 km^{2} (2.98 sq mi)

Population (2020)
  - Total: 33,422
  - Density: 4,329/km^{2} (11,210/sq mi)
- Time zone: UTC+1 (CET)
  - Summer (DST): UTC+2 (CEST)
- ISO 3166 code: NO-030109
- Website: bbj.oslo.kommune.no

Bjerke is a borough of the city of Oslo, Norway.

The most densely populated residential areas, including the high-rise apartment blocks of Linderud, are located along Trondheimsveien (Norwegian National Road 4). The shopping centre at Linderud is also home to the borough council's administrative headquarters. The northern areas of the borough are bordered by the vast woodlands of Oslomarka. Bjerke Upper Secondary School is located here.

== Districts ==
- Linderud
- Lofthus (on the border with Nordre Aker borough)
- Tonsenhagen
- Årvoll
- Veitvet
- Økern
- Risløkka

== Politics ==
As a borough of Oslo, Bjerke is governed by the city council of Oslo as well as its own borough council. The council leader is Lars Fuglesang from the Labour Party and the deputy leader is Hans Husum, of the Socialist Left Party. The Labour Party has the most seats. The 15 seats are distributed among the following political parties for the 2019-2023 term:

- 5 from the Labour Party (Arbeiderpartiet)
- 3 from the Conservative Party (Høyre)
- 2 from the Socialist Left Party (Sosialistisk Venstreparti)
- 2 from the Green Party (Miljøpartiet de Grønne)
- 1 from the Progress Party (Fremskrittspartiet)
- 1 from the Liberal Party (Venstre)
- 1 from the Red Party (Rødt)

== Transportation ==
Trondheimsveien is the main road that runs through the borough. Multiple busses on the local- and the regional bus network serve the area and allow for commuters to travel into the city-centre of Oslo. Multiple metro stations on the Grorud Line, also are in Bjerke and serve a similar purpose. A tram extension of the Sinsen Line has been proposed from the current stop at Sinsenkrysset and run all the way to Tonsenhagen.

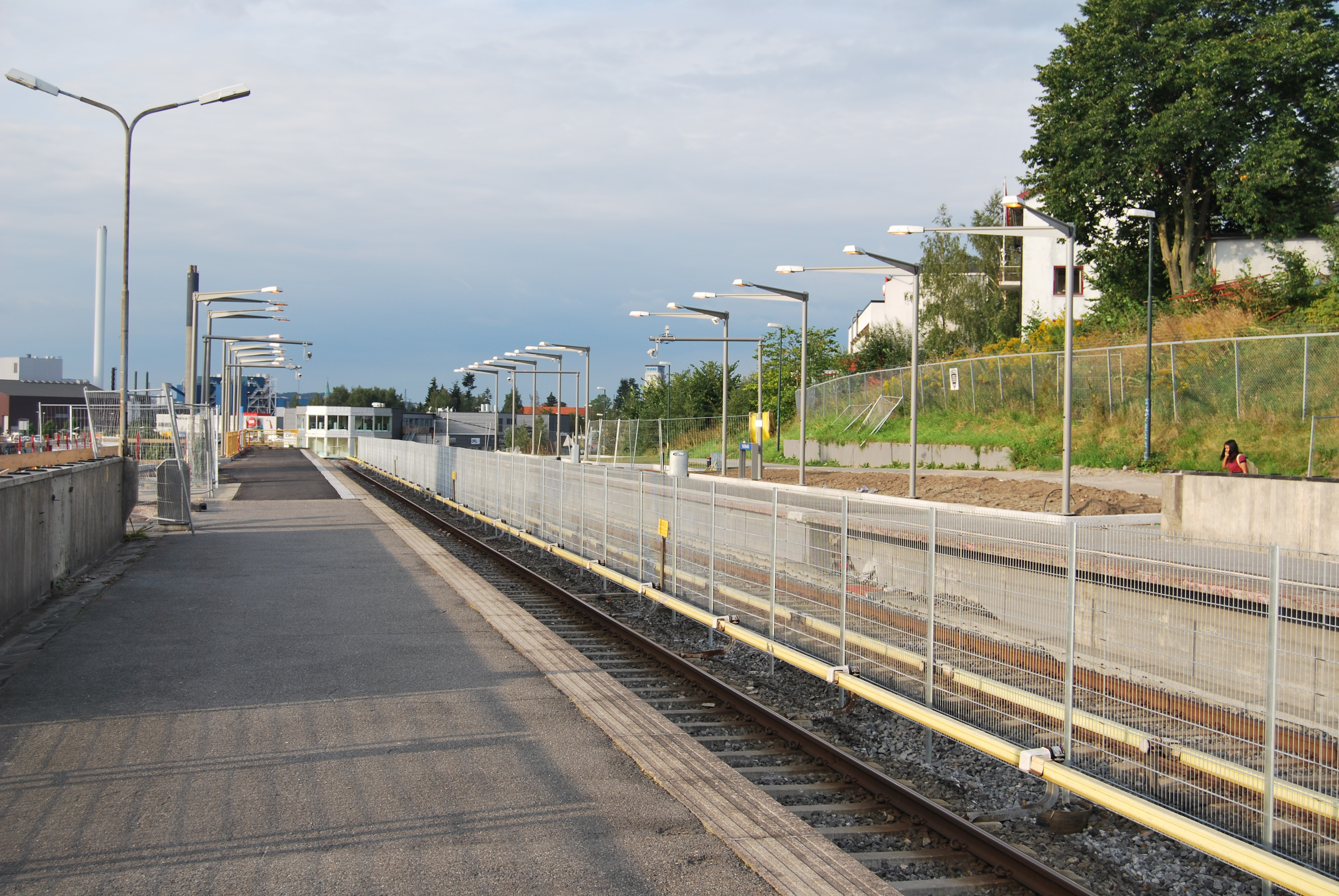
This is Vollebekk metro station. This is located within Bjerke.
