= Johan Strand Johansen =

Norwegian politician

Minister of Labour
- In office 25 June 1945 – 5 November 1945
- Prime Minister: Einar Gerhardsen
- Preceded by: Olav Hindahl
- Succeeded by: Nils Langhelle

Member of the Norwegian Parliament
- In office 4 December 1945 – 31 December 1957
- Constituency: Oslo

Personal details
- Born: 3 February 1903 Aafjord, Søndre Trondheim, United Kingdoms of Sweden and Norway
- Died: 12 February 1970 (aged 67) Moscow, Soviet Union
- Party: Communist
- Spouse(s): Elna Irene Nygaard (m. 1945); Helena Sterlina (till her death in 1942)

Johan Strand Johansen (3 February 1903 in Aafjord - 12 February 1970 in Moscow) was Norwegian Minister of Labour in 1945. From 1945-1949 and later from 1954-1957 he represented the Communist Party of Norway in the Parliament of Norway. His importance to posterity has been intimately tied to the dramatic split of the Communist Party in 1949, the so-called Furubotn purge.

== Early work and political career ==
In 1924 he became a journalist in the party daily newspaper Ny Tid in Trondheim, and starting that same year and until 1928 he was the secretary for the Young Communist League. In 1930 he became editor of Hardanger Arbeiderblad in Odda, and from 1931 his base was in Oslo, as a co-worker of the Arbeideren and as a member of the central board of the party. He was the representative of the central board on the strike rally which was later to become the Skirmish of Menstad, and in its aftermath he was given a prison sentence.

== Concentration camp and post-war politician ==
Strand Johansen was arrested by the Gestapo in 1941 and spent a major part of the war in Sachsenhausen. In 1945 he became part secretary, and at the same time he was elected to the Storting, becoming one of two NKP representatives in the coalition government. He was a central figure in the failed coalition negotiations with the Labour Party the same year.

== The Furubotn purge ==
"The Furubotn purge" (Furubotn-oppgjøret) is the term that has been applied to the turbulent split of the Norwegian Communist party in 1949. Strand Johansen, who was the main organizer of NKP's election campaign in 1949, was central also in the internal conflict that ensued and headed the faction that opposed Peder Furubotn – the "Løvlien faction" as it was named after party chairman Emil Løvlien. In the book Fiendebilde Wollweber (Enemy picture Wollweber) by Norwegian historian Lars Borgersrud, Strand Johansen is portrayed as a vitriolic opponent of the Furubotn faction. The conflict climaxed on 26 October 1949, when Strand Johansen together with five or more people showed up in the party offices in Klingenberggata 4 and kicked out Furubotn's supporters. The purge began six days prior when he had initiated the move against Furubotn at a meeting of trustees of the Oslo party, levelling against the supporters of Peder Furubotn fierce accusations of factionalism and of having set up an illegitimate party leadership – "the second center". In the following days the attacks continued during other party meetings, and on 25 October the central board decided to investigate the accusations and present them to the leadership of Cominform. In the meantime all individuals that had been accused by Strand Johansen would resign from their positions and a new central board was to be constituted. After the removal of Furubotn's people on 26 October, assisted by among others Asbjørn Sunde and Ragnar "Pelle" Sollie, Strand Johansen saw to it that Furubotn was excluded by the newly constituted central board which contained no supporters of Furubotn. Both during this commotion and during the next parliamentary campaign in 1953 witnesses described Johansen as mentally disturbed, initially as a natural reaction of disappointment at the obliteration of the communist representation in the parliament. In 1953 it was even suggested that Johansen should be sent off, either to the countryside or «exported» to the USSR. Asbjørn Sunde even suggested that Johansen be assassinated but received no support for such a drastic measure. Hans I. Kleven who himself was excluded from the party in the purge but was later invited back and went on to become its leader in the 1980s, has characterized Strand Johansen as a "sick, yes, a hysterical person," attributing these traits to the concentration camp period.

== Exit politics ==
In 1953 he was elected deputy chairman of the party, but he resigned in 1955 after having been sent off to Moscow for a spa treatment. He remained in Moscow until his death, and he did not have any political role after 1955.
