= Viggo Hansteen =

Norwegian lawyer (1900–1941)

Harald Viggo Hansteen
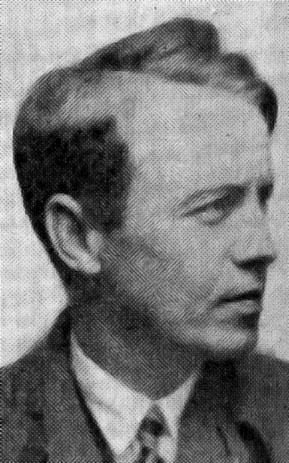
- Viggo Hansteen (c. 1930)
- Born: 13 September 1900; Oslo, Sweden-Norway
- Died: 10 September 1941 (aged 40); Årvoll, Oslo, Reichskommissariat Norwegen
- Cause of death: Execution by firing squad
- Occupations: Lawyer, politician
- Spouse: Kirsten Hansteen (m. 1930)

Harald Viggo Hansteen (13 September 1900 – 10 September 1941) was a Norwegian lawyer. He was executed during the Occupation of Norway by Nazi Germany.

== Biography ==
Harald Viggo Hansteen was born in Oslo, Norway. As a student he was a part of the establishment of the political organization Mot Dag. When cooperation between Mot Dag and the Norwegian Communist Party came to an end in 1929, he stayed in the Communist Party. He became a Supreme Court advocate in 1933 and judicial consultant for the Norwegian Confederation of Trade Unions in 1936. In 1940 he went with the government in exile to London, but came back to Oslo in June. He contributed strongly to the prevention of the Nasjonal Samling's attempt to gain control of the Confederation of Trade Unions.

Hansteen was executed on 10 September 1941 during the state of martial law which followed the so-called Milk Strike (Melkestreiken). The reason for the strike was that food supplies had become increasingly worse by September 1941. Also executed at the same time was labour activist Rolf Wickstrøm, who was the union steward and chairman for the union workers at the Skabo Jernbanevognfabrikk in Oslo. Hansteen and Wickstrøm were the first two Norwegian citizens executed by the German officials during the five-year occupation of Norway (1940–1945). After the liberation of Norway in 1945, Hansteen and Rolf Wickstrøm were buried in Vår Frelsers gravlund.

Viggo Hansteen and Rolf Wickstrøm were honored by the naming of a section of road around Oslo which bears their names.

In 1948, a memorial was erected in granite with a bronze relief at the site of Hansteen's execution at Årvoll in the Bjerke district of Oslo. The memorial was directed by Norwegian sculptor Nic Schiøll (1901–1984). It bears the following inscription:

Viggo Hansteen, Rolf Wickstrøm. The first victims in Norway's struggle for freedom from 1940-45. Shot by the Germans 10 September 1941.

— Inscription on the Memorial at Østre skytterlags bane

== Personal life ==
In 1930, he married Kirsten Hansteen (1903–1974). In 1945, she was appointed Minister of Social Affairs in Einar Gerhardsen's coalition government. She was Norway's first female cabinet member.
