= Norwegian People's Aid =

Norwegian non-governmental organisation

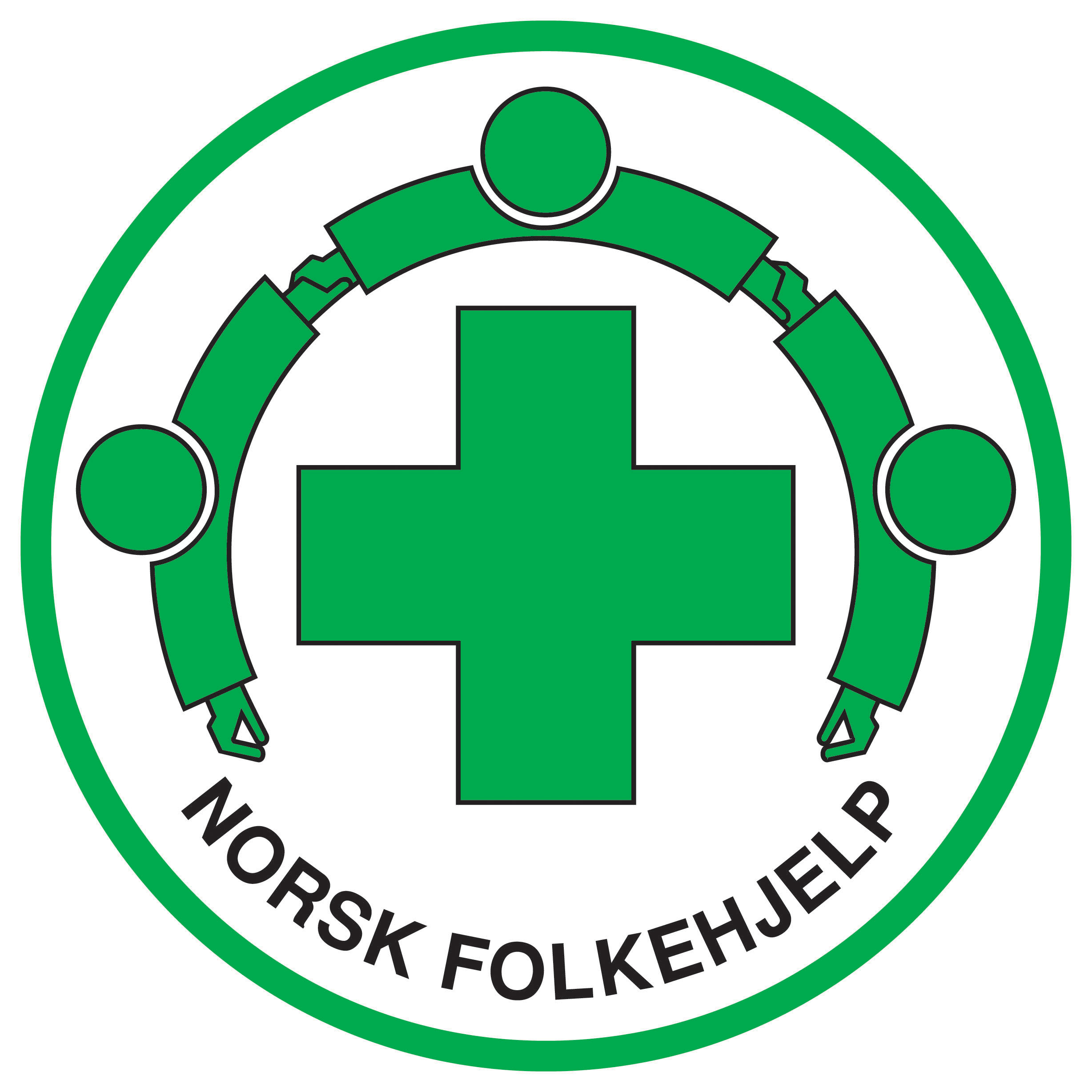
- Founded: 1939
- Location: Oslo, Norway
- Website: npaid.org

Norwegian People's Aid (NPA; Norwegian: Norsk Folkehjelp) was founded in 1939 to provide post-conflict reconstruction assistance and humanitarian relief during conflicts. NPA is now engaged in more than 31 countries in demining, humanitarian relief, promoting democratization, the rights of indigenous people, and fair distribution of power and resources. NPA currently operates demining activities in 19 countries.

NPA is a membership organization with approximately 3,000 volunteers that engage in search and rescue teams, international solidarity and refugee and integration activities.

In September 2026, a media outlet said that 1,700 will lose their jobs, including 40 or 50 in Norway.

== History ==
=== 1930s ===
Norwegian People's Aid was founded on 7 December 1939 as a natural continuation of the work of several Norwegian organizations who had been working to alleviate human suffering during the Spanish Civil War and the Winter War in Finland.

=== 1940s and 1950s ===
During World War II, NPA mobilized medical services across the country until the German occupying forces seized its assets and officially disbanded it in September 1941. NPA went into exile and continued work from Sweden.

After World War II, NPA took active part in the rebuilding of Norway, particularly in areas of health care. NPA built health centers and occupational health services throughout the country.

International participated particularly in the humanitarian relief efforts for refugees. In collaboration with Red Cross work was expanded in 1946 to include all of Europe in terms of the European Council.

=== 1960s and 1970s ===
NPA organized relief efforts globally such as the response after the earthquake in Skopje.

NPA was involved in the liberation of Zimbabwe, South Africa and Namibia. It was also fundraised for relief aid to earthquake victims in Yugoslavia.

=== 1980s and 1990s ===
NPA intensified efforts primarily in southern Africa and Latin America.

Food relief aid for 40 million people (1,200 tons) was collected and sent to Poland during the food crisis in the country. Efforts in the Middle East started with entering Lebanon in support of the Palestinian struggle in 1982 and NPA's extensive relief effort in South Sudan began in 1986.

NPA began working in Eastern Europe during this time, and in the new regime of South Africa, NPA was one of the first foreign organizations promoting democracy and transitional justice. Demining began on behalf of United Nations in Cambodia and Mozambique. In Norway, NPA established a guardian system for unaccompanied minor asylum seekers from countries in conflict.

=== 2000s ===
Hanne Anette Balch Fjalestad, a team member at NPA, was killed on Utøya during the terror attack on the 22 July 2011 and NPA provided emergency medical services to victims on-site after the attack.

NPA has taken a leading role in civil society's push for states to negotiate, adopt, adhere to, and implement international weapons treaties and played a central role in the International Campaign to Ban Landmines, the Convention on Cluster Munitions which was signed in Oslo in 2008 and the treaty to ban nuclear weapons that was adopted on 7 July 2017 and entered into force on 22 January 2021

As a board member of ICAN, NPA contributed to the campaign for a ban on nuclear weapons, which was awarded the Nobel Peace Prize in 2017.

As of September 2025, NPA operates in the following countries: Angola, Mozambique, Rwanda, South Africa, Sudan, South Sudan, Zimbabwe, Sudan, Bolivia, Colombia, Cuba, Ecuador, El Salvador, Guatemala, Honduras, Cambodia, Laos, Myanmar, Thailand, Vietnam, Bosnia, Herzegovina, Kosovo, Ukraine, Iraq, Lebanon, Palestine, and Syria.

== Criticism of NPA ==
=== U.S. settlement for projects with Palestinian youth in Gaza and work in Iran ===
In 2018, NPA paid a $2 million settlement to the US Department of Justice and after disagreements around the U.S. False Claims Act regarding democracy training for youth in Palestine from 2012 to 2016, and a demining project in Iran that ended in 2008, the latter an assignment for the Norwegian oil company Norsk Hydro. The case was based on a lawsuit from TZAC, INC (The Zionist Advocacy Center) in 2015. Israel has called on the EU to stop funding Norwegian People's Aid due to its alleged links to groups categorized by the United States, EU and Israel as terrorist groups. Several EU countries have claimed that they have not received sufficient evidence to consider Israel's allegations.
