= Håkon Meyer =

Norwegian politician

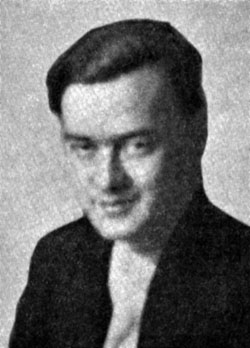
- Born: 11 March 1896; Kristiania, Norway
- Died: 23 October 1989 (aged 93); Malmö, Sweden
- Occupations: politician, trade unionist and businessperson

Håkon Meyer (11 March 1896 – 23 October 1989) was a Norwegian politician, trade unionist and businessperson.

Meyer was born in Kristiania, the son of Ludvig Meyer and Emma Metz. In the 1920s and 1930s, he was an active and leading Labour Party politician, and chaired the Social-Democratic Youth League. Meyer had a leading position in the trade union opposition group called "Fagopposisjonen av 1940", and became a member of Nasjonal Samling in December 1940. He chaired the Norwegian Union of Municipal Employees from 1941 to 1942.

In the legal purge in Norway after World War II, Meyer was sentenced to 10 years in prison for treason. In mitigation, the court took into account that Meyer had used his political contacts to help a number of German emigrants and Jews flee Norway. Meyer was released from prison in 1949. He later settled in Sweden, where he was running a trading company. In 1952 he published the book Et annet syn. He died in Malmö in 1989.
