= Odd Fossum =

Norwegian shop assistant

- Born: 15 December 1905
- Died: 23 July 1958 (aged 52)

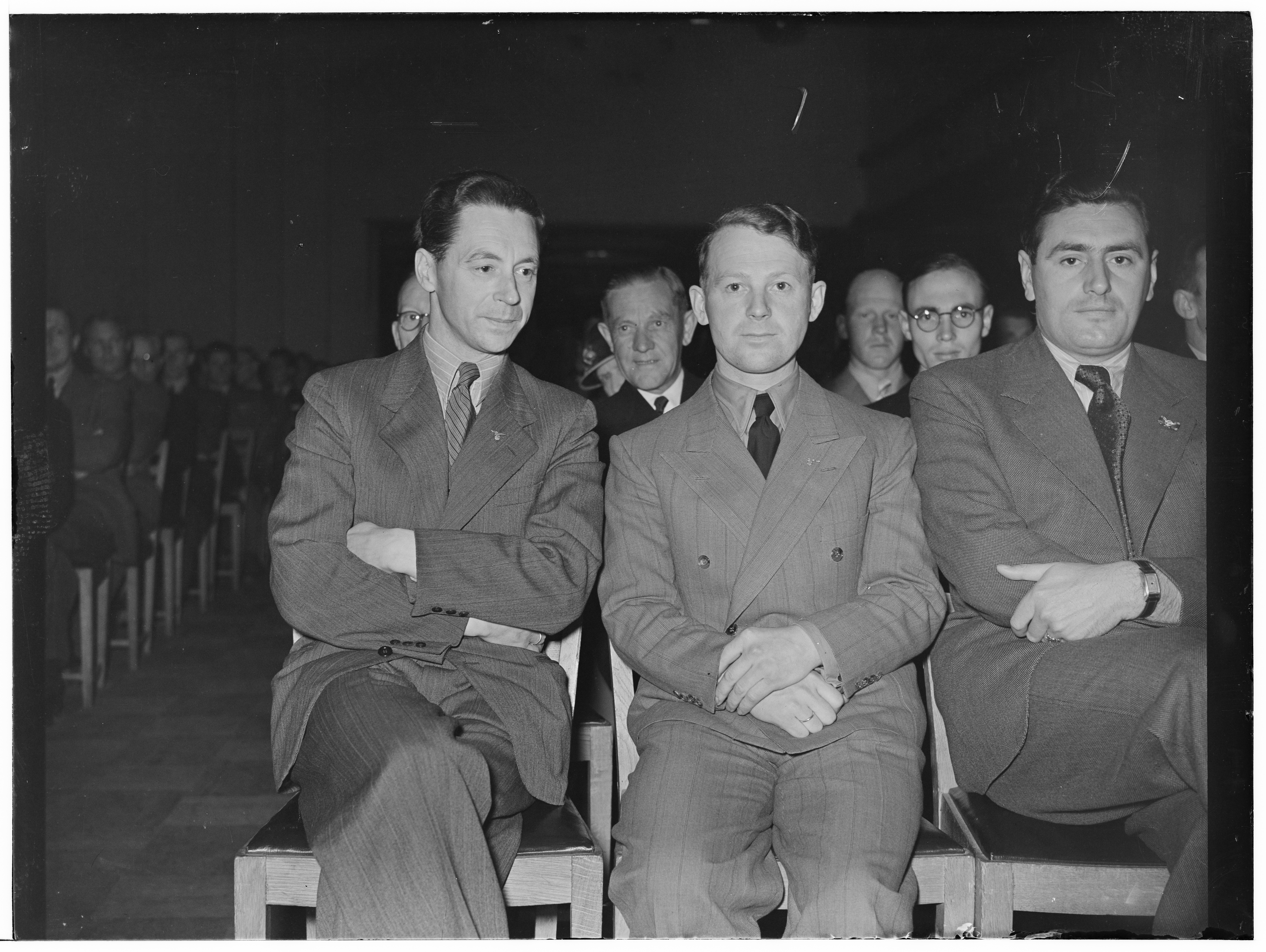

Odd Fossum (15 December 1905 – 23 July 1958) was a Norwegian shop assistant, and leader of the Norwegian Confederation of Trade Unions from 1941 to 1945, under the Nazi regime during the occupation of Norway by Nazi Germany. He was also the leader of NS Faggruppeorganisasjon from 12 October 1940 to September 1944, when he was succeeded by Olav M. Hoff.
