= Sollia (disambiguation) =

Sollia may refer to:

== Places ==
- Sollia, a village in Stor-Elvdal Municipality in Innlandet county, Norway
- Sollia Municipality, a former municipality in the old Hedmark county, Norway
- Sollia Church, a church in Stor-Elvdal Municipality in Innlandet county, Norway
- Sollia, Akershus, a village in Vestby Municipality in Akershus county, Norway
- Sollia (Fjordruta), a hiking lodge in the Vinje area of Heim Municipality in Trøndelag county, Norway
- Sollia (Gurskøya), a mountain on the island of Gurskøya in Møre og Romsdal county, Norway
