= Ole Olsen Evenstad =

Ole Olsen Evenstad may refer to:

- Ole Olsen Evenstad (born 1766), member of the Norwegian Parliament
- Ole Olsen Evenstad (born 1775), member of the Norwegian Parliament
