= 1972 Norwegian European Communities membership referendum =

1972 Norwegian–European Communities membership referendum
- 25 September 1972
- Should Norway join the European Community?

Results
Choice	Votes	%
Yes	971,687	46.49%
No	1,118,281	53.51%
Valid votes	2,089,968	99.70%
Invalid or blank votes	6,388	0.30%
Total votes	2,096,356	100.00%
Registered voters/turnout	2,680,907	78.2%
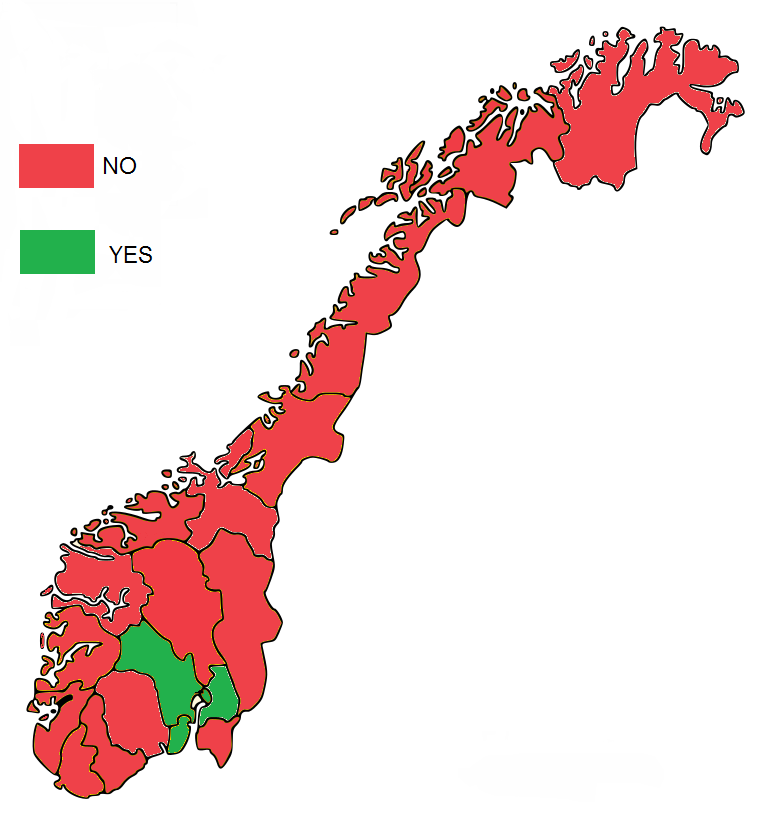
- Results by county. No-votes Yes-votes

A referendum on joining the European Community was held in Norway on 25 September 1972. After a long period of heated debate, the "no" side won with 53.5% of the vote. Prime Minister Trygve Bratteli, who had championed a "yes" vote, resigned as a result. This was Norway's second attempt at becoming a member, after having been vetoed by France in January 1963 and again temporarily in 1967, but the first attempt with a referendum on a set of fully negotiated accession terms.

== Endorsement ==
Vote against EC
- Workers' Youth League
- Det Norske Samlaget
- En verdens ungdom
- Fjordfisk
- Folkereisning mot krig
- Forbundet Mot Rusgift
- Hordafisk
- Håbrann Fiskernes Salgslag
- Women's International League for Peace and Freedom Norway
- Young Communist League of Norway
- Young Christian Democrats (Norway)
- Kristent Fredslag
- Landbrukets Sentralforbund
- Noregs Lærarmållag
- Noregs Mållag
- Noregs Ungdomslag
- Norges Bygdekvinnelag
- Norwegian Agrarian Association
- Norges Bygdeungdomslag
- Norges Fiskarlag
- Norges Godtemplar Ungdomsforbund
- Norges Gymnasiastsamband
- Norges Kjøtt- og Fleskesentral
- Communist Party of Norway
- Norges Levendefisklag
- Liberal Students of Norway
- Norges Makrellag
- Norges Råfisklag
- Young Liberals of Norway
- Norwegian Union of General Workers
- Norsk Bonde- og Småbrukarlag Kvinnegrupper
- Norwegian Poultry Association
- Norsk Gartnerforbund
- Norwegian Graphical Union
- Norsk Grønnsakdyrker Lag
- Norwegian Union of Iron and Metalworkers
- Norsk Kvinneforbund
- Norsk kvinneparti
- Norsk Målungdom
- Norsk Planteskolelag
- Norsk Psykologforening
- Norsk Sosionomforbund (1959-ukjent)
- Norsk Studentunion
- Norwegian Transport Workers' Union
- Noregs Ungdomslag
- Norske Melkeprodusenters Landsforbund
- Rogaland Fiskerslag
- Senterkvinnene
- Centre Party (Norway)
- Senterpartiets studieforbund
- Senterungdommens Landsforbund
- Skagerakfisk
- Sogn og Fjordane Fiskesalslag
- Socialist People's Party
- Sosialistiske legers forening
- Sunnmøre og Romsdal Fiskesalslag
- Unge Kunstneres Samfund
Vote in favor of EC
- Gullsmedfagets Rasjonaliseringsselskap
- Hotel and Restaurant Workers' Union
- Norwegian Conservative Party's Women's Association
- Conservative Party
- Kortevare- og Leketøygrossitenes Landsforening
- Kosmetikkleverandørenes forening
- Norwegian Confederation of Trade Unions
- Libertas
- Lærvarehandlernes Landsforening
- Malermestrenes Landsforbund
- Mineralvannsfabrikkenes Landsforening
- Møbelprodusentenes Landsforening
- Nordic Group
- Norges Sildesalgslag
- Norwegian Motor Trade Association
- Norwegian Export Council
- Norges Farvehandlerforbund
- Norges Ferskfiskeomsetnings Landsforening
- Norges Glass- og Stentøihandleres Forbund
- Norges Gullsmedforbund
- Union of Employees in Commerce and Offices
- Norges Handelsstands Forbund
- Federation of Norwegian Industries (1919–1989)
- Norges dagligvareforbund
- Conservative Students' Association (Oslo)
- Norwegian Shipowners' Association
- Norges Skibsførerforbund
- Norges Tekstilkjøpmenns Forbund
- Norges Treforedlingsråd
- Norwegian Employers' Confederation
- Norwegian Union of Building Industry Workers
- Norwegian Union of Electricians and Power Station Officials
- Norsk Elektroteknisk Forening
- Norwegian Prison and Probation Officers' Union
- Norsk gullsmedarbeiderforbund
- Norwegian Union of Chemical Industry Workers
- Norwegian Union of Municipal Employees
- National Union of Norwegian Locomotivemen
- Norsk Medisinalindustris Felleskontor
- Norwegian Union of Food, Beverage and Allied Workers
- Norwegian Union of Paper Industry Workers
- Norwegian Union of Postmen
- Norwegian Seafarers' Union
- Norsk Skibsmæglerforbund
- Norwegian Union of Forestry and Land Workers
- Norwegian Union of Telecommunication Workers
- Norwegian Civil Service Union
- Norwegian Union of Wood Industry Workers
- Norsk Agenters Landsforbund
- Norske Fiskerprodusenters Forening
- Norske Forsikringselskerps forbund
- Norske håndverks- og Industribedrifters Forbund
- Norske Papirhandlers Landsforbund
- Norske Svovelkisprodusenters Forening
- Parfymehandlernes Landsforbund
- Polyteknisk Forenings Gruppe for Bedriftsledelse
- Redernes Arbeidsgiverforening
- Skibsfartens Arbeidsgiverforening
- Skogbruksforeningen av 1950
- Statstjenestemannskartellet
- Norwegian Young Conservatives

== Results ==
Choice	Votes	%
For	971,687	46.49
Against	1,118,281	53.51
Total	2,089,968	100.00
Valid votes	2,089,968	99.70
Invalid/blank votes	6,388	0.30
Total votes	2,096,356	100.00
Registered voters/turnout	2,680,907	78.20
Source: SSB

=== By constituency ===
Constituency	Electorate	Spoilt votes	Total poll (%)	For (%)	Against (%)
Østfold	152,837	392	121,498 (80)	58,931 (49)	62,567 (51)
Akershus	217,851	542	180,503 (83)	102,521 (57)	77,982 (43)
Oslo	356,153	619	291,654 (82)	193,980 (67)	97,674 (33)
Hedmark	124,960	519	99,508 (80)	44,150 (44)	55,358 (56)
Oppland	120,082	314	94,114 (79)	37,550 (40)	56,564 (60)
Buskerud	139,999	400	110,387 (79)	59,532 (54)	50,855 (46)
Vestfold	155,338	247	94,355 (79)	53,515 (57)	40,840 (43)
Telemark	108,485	211	84,056 (78)	32,284 (38)	51,772 (62)
Aust-Agder	55,276	138	40,909 (74)	18,659 (46)	22,250 (54)
Vest-Agder	81,707	177	64,100 (79)	27,510 (43)	36,590 (57)
Rogaland	174,925	309	138,601 (79)	62,096 (45)	76,505 (55)
Hordaland	248,675	511	198,095 (80)	96,996 (49)	101,099 (51)
Sogn og Fjordane	67,335	153	51,705 (77)	15,923 (31)	35,782 (69)
Møre og Romsdal	146,917	240	114,709 (78)	33,504 (29)	81,205 (71)
Sør-Trøndelag	159,730	248	122,092 (77)	51,827 (42)	70,265 (58)
Nord-Trøndelag	77,954	107	60,495 (78)	19,101 (32)	41,394 (68)
Nordland	157,183	549	120,979 (77)	33,228 (27)	87,751 (73)
Troms	88,174	385	66,499 (76)	19,820 (30)	46,679 (70)
Finnmark	47,326	327	35,709 (76)	10,560 (30)	25,149 (70)

== See also ==
- 1994 Norwegian European Union membership referendum
