= Torkel =

Torkel is a Nordic masculine given name that may refer to

- Torkel Andreas Trønnes (1925-2011), Norwegian automobile advocate
- Torkel Franzén (1950–2006), Swedish academic
- Torkel Halvorsen Aschehoug (1822–1909), Norwegian philosopher of law, economist and politician
- Torkel Klingberg, Swedish neuroscientist
- Torkel Knutsson (?–1306), Swedish constable and privy council
- Torkel Lende (1849–1909), Norwegian inventor
- Torkel Lillefosse (1868–1946), Norwegian botanist
- Torkel Opsahl (1931–1993), Norwegian human rights scholar
  - Torkel Opsahl Academic EPublisher
- Torkel Persson (1894–1972), Swedish cross country skier
- Torkel Petersson (born 1969), Swedish actor
- Torkel Ravndal (1936–2004), Norwegian weightlifter and powerlifter
- Torkel S. Wächter, German-Swedish novelist and airline captain
- Torkel Weis-Fogh (1922–1975), Danish zoologist
- Torkel Wetterhus (born 1944), Norwegian businessperson and politician
