= Ole Olsen Evenstad (born 1766) =

Norwegian politician

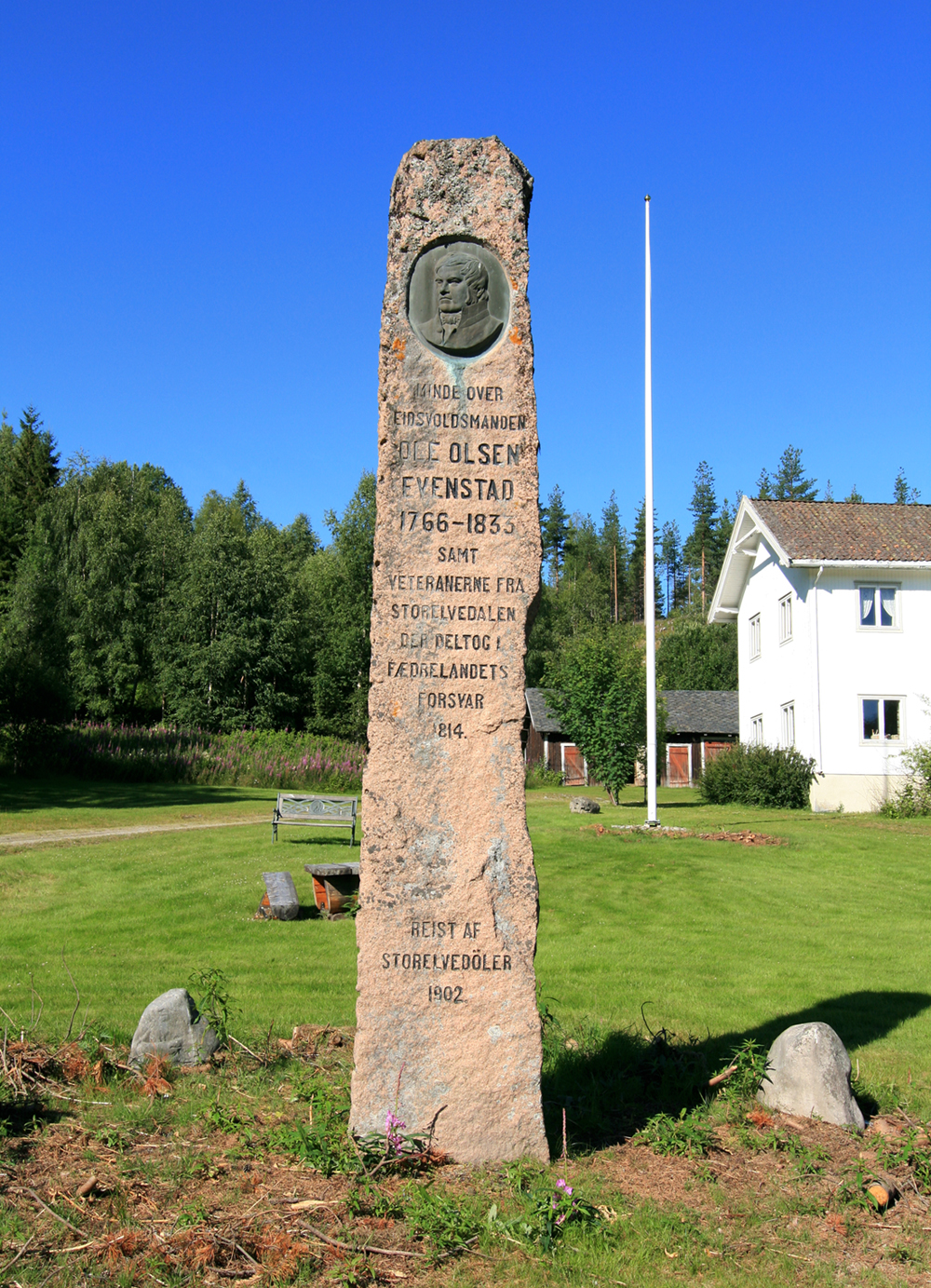
Ole Olsen Evenstad memorial at Stor-Elvdal Church

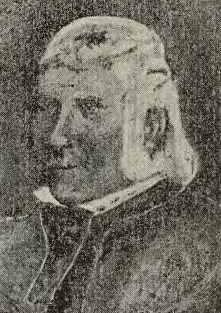
Ole Olsen Evenstad

Ole Olsen Evenstad (23 September 1766 – 20 February 1833) was a Norwegian farmer and elected official who served as a representative at the Norwegian Constitutional Assembly.

== Biography ==
Ole Olsen Evenstad was born on the Evenstad farm in Stor-Elvdal parish in Hedmark county, Norway. He was the son of a farm owner and local sheriff, Ole Olsen Evenstad (1739–1806) and Gertrude Helgesdatter Søstu Stai (1745–1820). Evenstad later ran the family farm and also served as sheriff in his district.

Ole Olsen Evenstad was elected to the Norwegian Constituent Assembly at Eidsvoll Manor in 1814, representing the constituency of Hedemarkens Amt (now Hedmark). Together with his fellow delegates from Hedmark, Claus Bendeke and Andreas Aagaard Kiønig, he supported the position of the independence party (Selvstendighetspartiet). In 1821 he was awarded the Medal for Outstanding Civic Service (Borgerdådsmedaljen) second class in silver. He became a member of the Norwegian Parliament for Hedmark in 1824 where he was a member of the commission for mining and forestry. He also was a member of the Conciliation Commission (Forlikskommisjon) in his district.

== Evenstad skogskole ==
In 1912, the former Evenstad farm was acquired by the Evenstad Forestry School (Evenstad skogskole). The 126-year-old main building at Evenstad burned down in 1987. Since 1989 the former farm and forestry school has served as the Evenstad Campus of Hedmark University College. The school offers degrees in forestry and wildlife management, together with advanced courses of study in applied ecology.

== Personal life ==
In 1795, he married his cousin Kari Olsdatter Søstu Stai (1766–1828). They were the parents of two sons, Ole Olsen Evenstad (1798–1859) and Helge Olsen Evenstad (1800–1801). Evenstad died in 1833 at 67 years of age and was buried at Stor-Elvdal Church.

== Related Reading ==
- Holme Jørn (2014) De kom fra alle kanter - Eidsvollsmennene og deres hus (Oslo: Cappelen Damm) ISBN 978-82-02-44564-5
