= Thore Myrvang =

Norwegian educator and politician

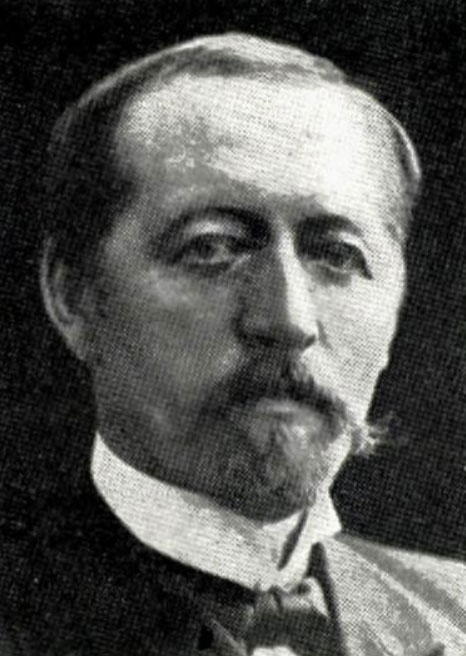
Portrait of Thore Embretsen Myrvang

Thore Embretsen Myrvang (21 January 1858 – 9 July 1939) was a Norwegian educator and politician for the Liberal Party and the Labour Democrats.

He was born in Tynset Municipality as a son of farmers Embret Thoresen Myrvang (1828–1884) and Gisken Krogseng (1829–1922). He took teacher's education at Hamar Seminary in 1877, and was a teacher in Stor-Elvdalen Municipality until 1916. He also owned the farm Westgård from 1896. From 1911 to 1915 he was the acting school director of the Diocese of Hamar, being a substitute for Olav Andreas Eftestøl who was an MP.

Myrvang served as mayor of Stor-Elvdal from 1901 to 1904, 1913 to 1916 and 1922 to 1925. During the last period he also chaired the county council (which was composed of mayors). He then represented the Labour Democrats, which he joined after the split from the Liberal Party. For both these parties, he served a total of six terms in the Parliament of Norway. The first five terms were continuous, with Myrvang winning elections in 1894, 1897, 1900, 1903 and 1906. On the latter occasion, the system with single-member constituencies had been implemented, and Myrvang won because he gathered the social democratic vote.

In 1912, he was elected as the deputy of Olav Andreas Eftestøl in Søndre Østerdalen, whereas in 1915 he was elected to his sixth and last term, with K. K. Sanaker as his deputy. In 1918, the last election with single-member constituencies, he lost to Johan Bondesen, social democrat from Stor-Elvdal. In 1921, Myrvang headed the party ballot in the plural-member constituency Hedmark, whereas in 1924 he was the second candidate on a joint list with the Liberal Party, both times without being elected.

Among his other posts, Myrvang chaired the county school board of Hedmark from 1924 to 1930, and also chaired the Norwegian Farmers and Smallholders Union.
