= Atnsjøen =

Lake in Innlandet, Norway

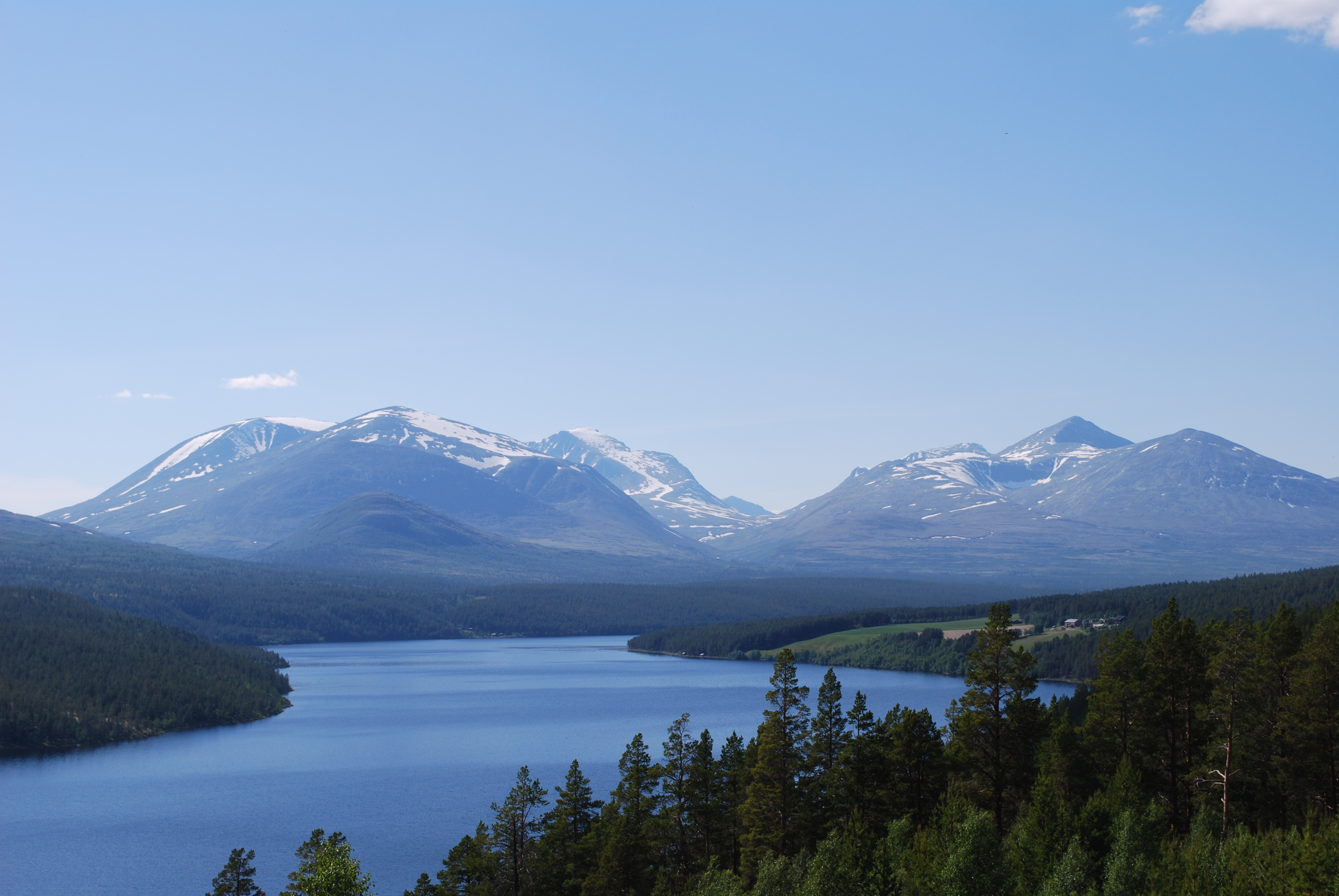
- Interactive map of the lake
- Location: Østerdalen, Innlandet
- Coordinates: 61°52′31″N 10°10′37″E
- Basin countries: Norway
- Max. length: 8.5 kilometres (5.3 mi)
- Max. width: 750 metres (2,460 ft)
- Surface area: 5.0 km^{2} (1.9 sq mi)
- Max. depth: 80 metres (260 ft)
- Shore length^{1}: 19.38 kilometres (12.04 mi)
- Surface elevation: 701 metres (2,300 ft)
- References: NVE
- ^{1} Shore length is not a well-defined measure.

Atnsjøen is a lake in Innlandet county, Norway. The 5-square-kilometre (1.9 sq mi) lake lies along the border of Sør-Fron Municipality and Stor-Elvdal Municipality, just east of Rondane National Park. The Norwegian County Road 27 runs along the eastern shoreline of the entire lake. The village of Sollia lies about 20 kilometres (12 mi) to the southeast of the lake.

== See also ==
- List of lakes in Norway
