= Koppang Station =

Railway station in Stor-Elvdal, Norway

Koppang
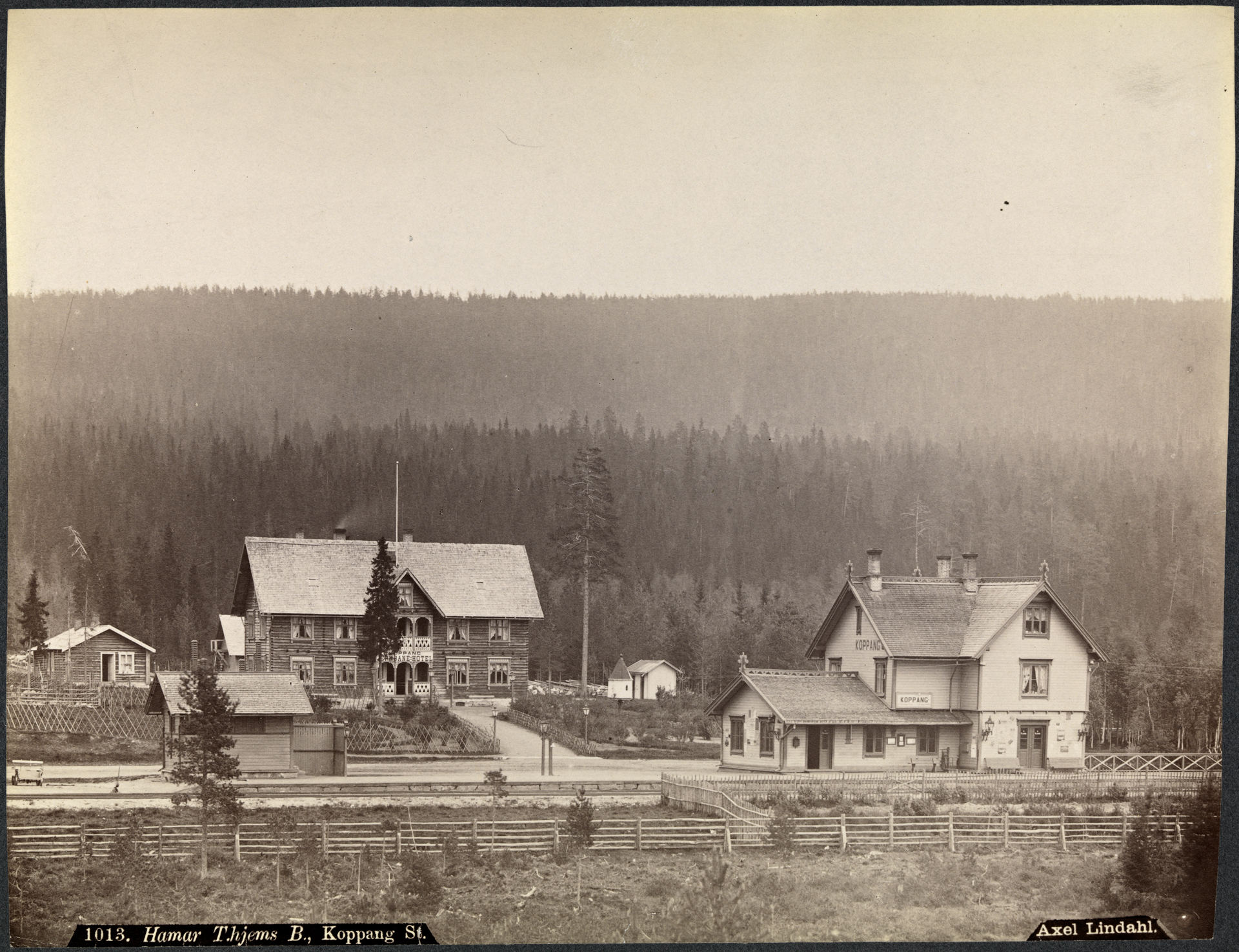

General information
- Location: Koppang, Stor-Elvdal Municipality; Norway
- Coordinates: 61.5729°N 11.0440°E
- Elevation: 352.6 metres (1,157 ft) AMSL
- Owner: Bane NOR
- Operator: SJ Norge
- Line: Røros Line
- Distance: 246.81 kilometres (153.36 mi)
- Platforms: 2

History
- Opened: 1875
Location

Koppang Station (Norwegian: Koppang stasjon) is a railway station located at Koppang in Stor-Elvdal Municipality, Norway on the Røros Line. It is located 246.81 kilometers (153.36 mi) from Oslo Central Station at 352.6 meters (1,157 ft) above mean sea level. Services are provided by the SJ Norge to Røros and Hamar. The station opened in 1875.

Norsk Spisevognselskap operated the restaurant in the station from 15 June to 1 October 1925, after which operation was reverted to the station master. After the Dovre Line opened, Koppang Station only had a marginal income from the restaurant operations. After the line was rebuilt to standard gauge, revenue from the restaurant increased, and from 1 January 1925 Spisevognselskapet again took over operations of the restaurant.

The Norwegian National Rail Administration plans to install a modular set of sheds on all stations on the Røros Line. They therefore offered an architecture competition where they asked for bids to reuse style components from the station buildings, while retaining functional and modular design. The competition was won by Trondheim-based Vis-à-vis. Construction of the shed at Koppang Station was done by Østerdalen Byggservice and cost 300,000 kr. It consists of two modules, each 2.0 by 2.4 meters (6 ft 7 in by 7 ft 10 in). The roof is covered in rheinzink and the benches are made in pine. However, there is a mismatch between the yellow of the station building and the yellow of the shed. The shed was scheduled to be taken into use on 5 March 2012.

Preceding station			Following station
Atna	Røros Line		Stai
Preceding station	Regional trains		Following station
Atna	R60	Hamar–Røros	Stai
