= Norwegian university college reform =

Reorganization of colleges in Norway

The University college reform was a reform throughout Norway where 98 smaller colleges were transformed into 26 larger university colleges on 1 August 1994. In addition a number of fine art educations were merged to two National Academies of the Arts, in Oslo and in Bergen.

== Goal and result ==
The reform gave each county their own university college, except for the two Agder counties, who shared one. Some counties have more than one, with Møre og Romsdal and Nordland topping with three each. The university colleges were given the main responsibility for training nurses, teachers, preschool teachers, engineers and business administrators. In addition a number of other tasks were included in the colleges portfolio.

The goal of the reform, that was initiated by the then Minister of Education, Gudmund Hernes from the Labour Party, was to effectivate the operations at the colleges through economy of scale. Herned had led the public committee that in 1988 had launched the idea of merging and co locating the colleges. The idea was to use teaching resources dedicated to academic administration instead to be used for teaching and research.

An evaluation of the reform after five years concluded that reform had not succeeded and that the resulting more efficient operations came from lower state subsidies instead of more efficient operations. It also showed that the reform gave the educational personnel more administrative work. It did, however, standardize teaching and syllabus throughout the country's university system.

== Other processes ==
Two years later the Norwegian University of Science and Technology was created in Trondheim after a merger of the Norwegian Institute of Technology and the University of Trondheim, reducing the number of public colleges and universities in Trondheim from thirteen to two.

From 2005 university colleges were allowed to convert into universities if they met certain requirements. So far both Stavanger University College and Agder University College have converted (to the University of Stavanger and the University of Agder, respectively). Also Bodø, Buskerud, Telemark, Vestfold, Hedmark, Lillehammer and Gjøvik have announced that they wish to convert to universities, either by themselves or through mergers. Tromsø University College ceased to exist in 2009 as it was incorporated into the University of Tromsø.
