= Strand Church (Stor-Elvdal) =

Church in Innlandet, Norway

- Strand kirke
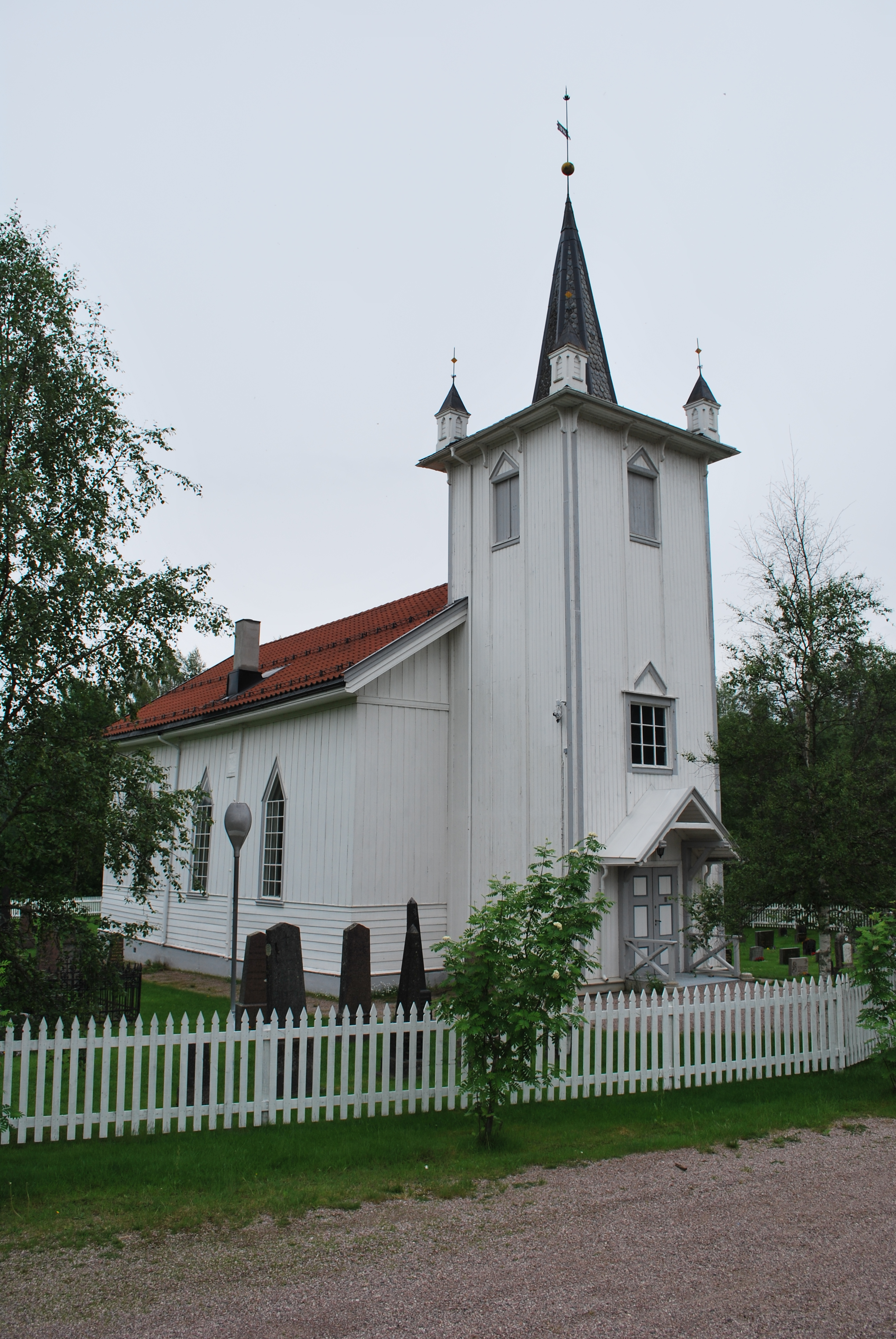
- View of the church
- Strand Church
- 61°17′26″N 11°16′27″E
- Location: Stor-Elvdal, Innlandet
- Country: Norway
- Denomination: Church of Norway
- Churchmanship: Evangelical Lutheran

History
- Status: Parish church
- Founded: 1863
- Consecrated: 2 December 1863

Architecture
- Functional status: Active
- Architect: Jacob Wilhelm Nordan
- Architectural type: Rectangular
- Completed: 1863 (163 years ago)

Specifications
- Capacity: 300
- Materials: Wood

Administration
- Diocese: Hamar bispedømme
- Deanery: Sør-Østerdal prosti
- Parish: Strand
- Norwegian Cultural Heritage Site
- Type: Church
- Status: Protected
- ID: 85588

Strand Church (Norwegian: Strand kirke) is a parish church of the Church of Norway in Stor-Elvdal Municipality in Innlandet county, Norway. It is located in the village of Strand. It is the church for the Strand parish which is part of the Sør-Østerdal prosti (deanery) in the Diocese of Hamar. The white, wooden church was built in a rectangular design in 1863 using plans drawn up by the architect Jacob Wilhelm Nordan. The church seats about 300 people.

== History ==
The people of Strand had long desired their own local church due to the more than 30-kilometre (19 mi) long journey to the Stor-Elvdal Church where they had historically gone to church. Approval was finally granted in the early 1860s. Jacob Wilhelm Nordan was hired to design the new church. Construction began in April 1863 and it progressed through the summer and fall. The church is rectangular in design with the nave and choir in the same room. There's a small sacristy on the east end and a church porch with tower on the west end. The new church was consecrated on 2 December 1863.

== Media gallery ==
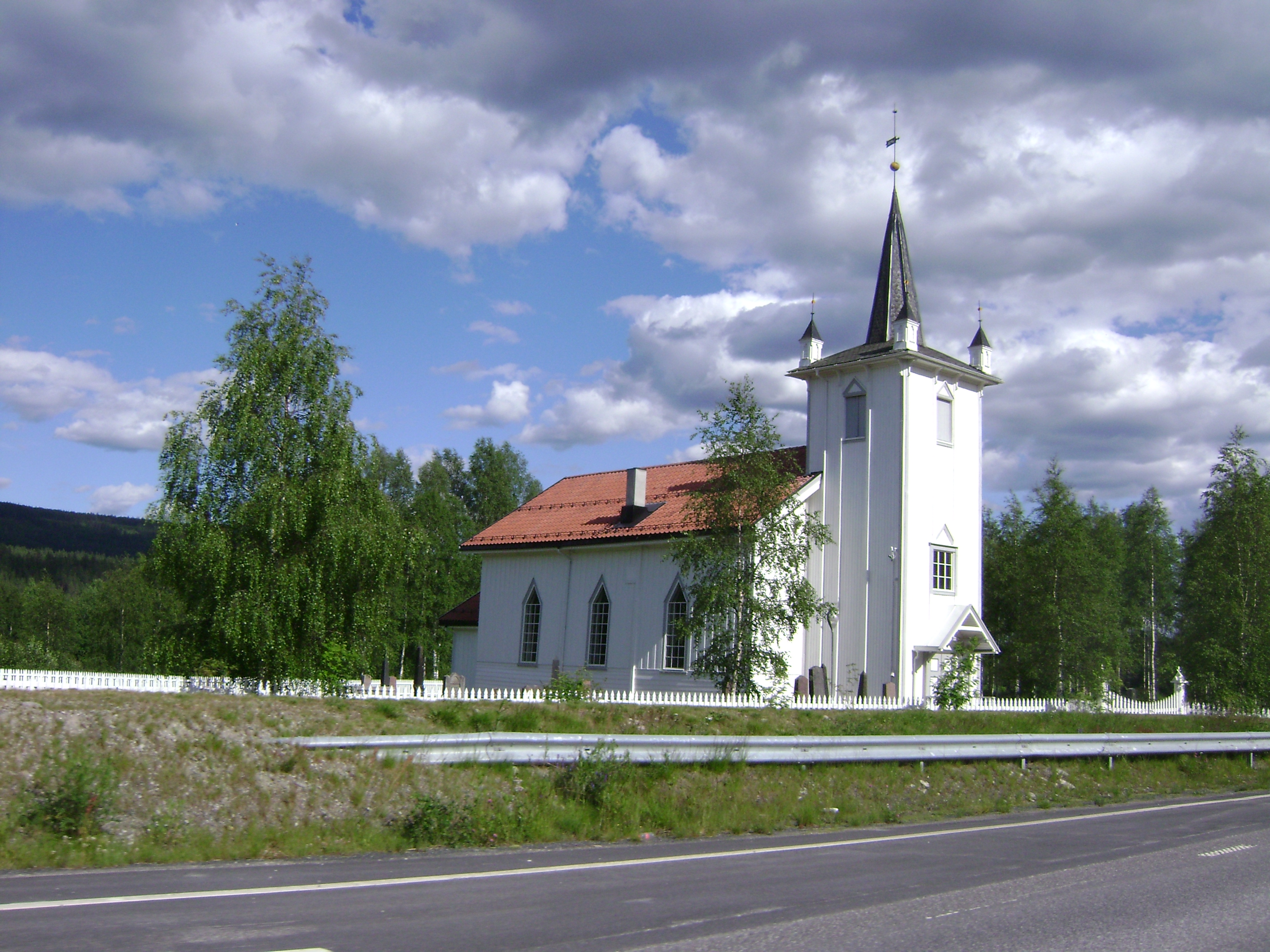

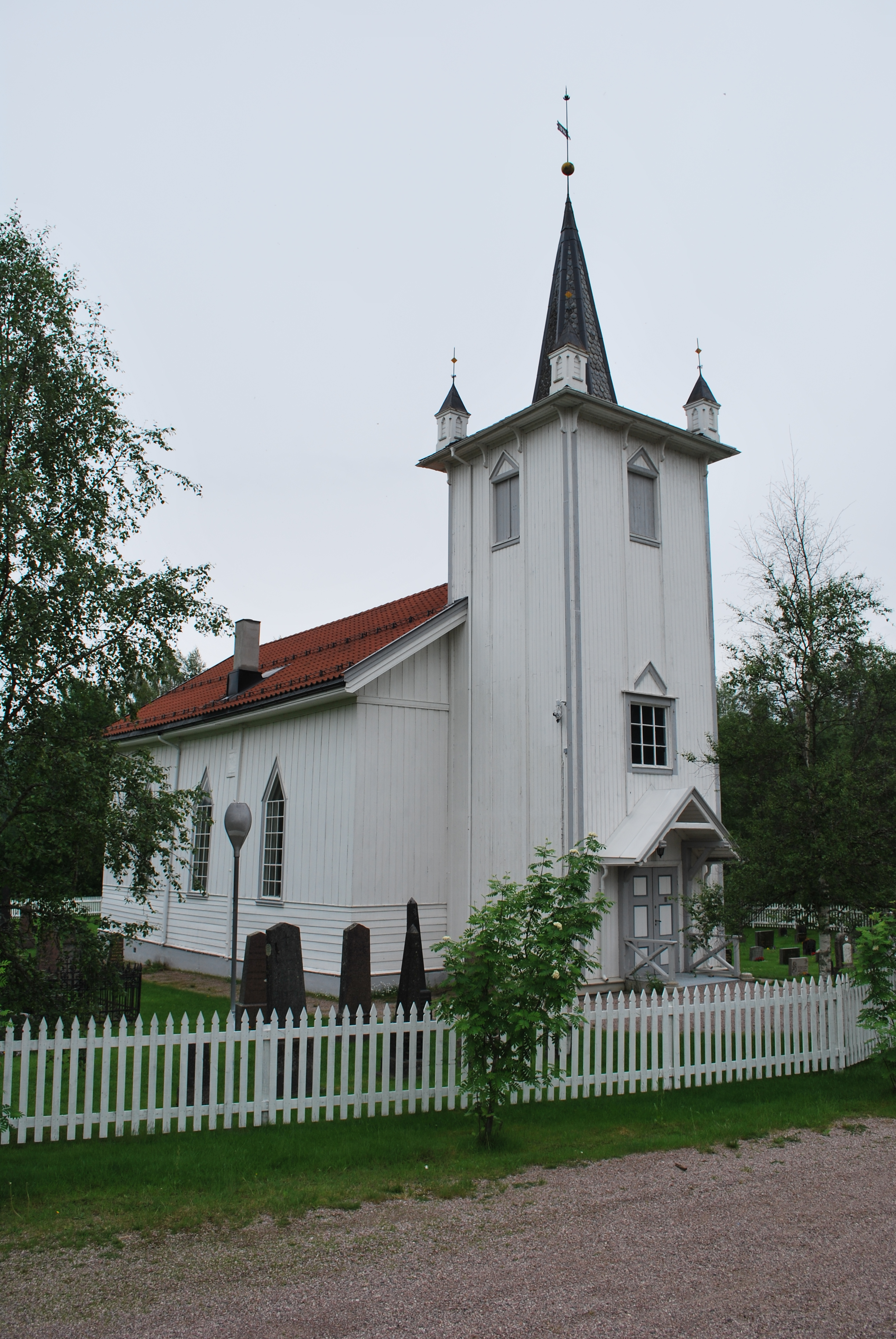

== See also ==
- List of churches in Hamar
