= Halldis Neegaard Østbye =

Norwegian Nazi and member of the Norwegian fascist party

Halldis Neegaard Østbye, née Halldis Neegaard (23 May 1896 – 13 Oct 1983) was a Norwegian anti-Semite and national socialist. She was born in Stor-Elvdal Municipality. During World War II, she was known as a prominent member of the fascist Nasjonal Samling party, and was referred to as "Norway's most fanatical naziwoman" by Arne Skouen. Aside from her political activity, she is remembered as the first chairman of the Lady's Ski club, and was thus very important for the women's ski sport development in Norway.
