= Aina Bartmann =

Norwegian politician

Aina Nilsen Bartmann, née Edelmann (born 16 April 1959) is leader of the foundation Farmer's Market in Norway, former leader of the Norwegian Farmers and Smallholders Union from 1992 to 1994 and politician for the Socialist Left Party.

== Career ==
She grew up in Bærum Municipality, but worked as a goat farmer in Lyngen Municipality from 1979 to 1992. From 1992 to 1996 she was the leader of the Norwegian Farmers and Smallholders Union. As a leader of the organization she played an important role in the campaign against Norwegian membership in the EU before the referendum on the question in 1994. She issued the book Bondelandet ("Farmer Country") on Det Norske Samlaget together with Svein Sæter in 1994.

She has later worked for the Norwegian Society for the Conservation of Nature, the Norwegian Agrarian Association and since 2003 the Federation of Norwegian Agricultural Co-operatives. Since 2010 she has headed the foundation Farmer's Market which was split from the agricultural cooperatives.

She has been involved in politics for the Socialist Left Party, as a member of the central committee from 1999 to 2001 and the national board from 2003 to 2005.

She was the chair of the Norwegian Institute for Nature and Cultural Heritage Research from 1997 to 2001 (since 2003 split into the Norwegian Institute for Nature Research and the Norwegian Institute for Cultural Heritage Research) and of the GenØk - Centre for Biosafety from 2006.

Non-profit organization positions
Preceded by Per Olaf Lundteigen	Leader of the Norwegian Farmers and Smallholders Union; 1992–1996	Succeeded by Torgeir Strøm
