= Evenstad =

Village in Stor-Elvdal Municipality, Norway

- Village
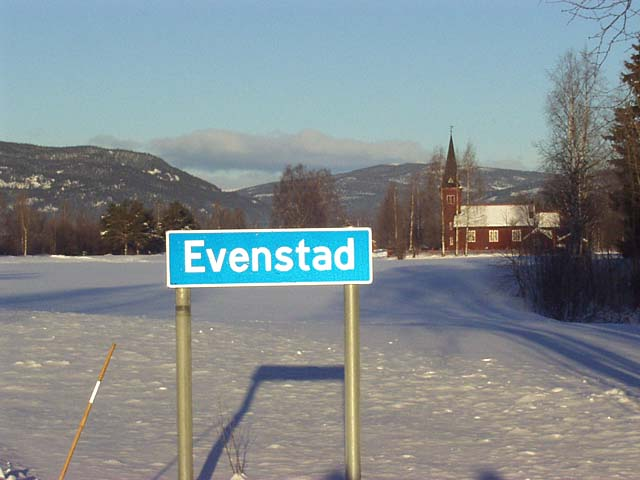
- View of the village road sign
- Interactive map of Evenstad
- Location within Innlandet Location within Norway
- Coordinates: 61.42419°N 11.09745°E
- Country: Norway
- Region: Eastern Norway
- County: Innlandet
- District: Østerdalen
- Municipality: Stor-Elvdal Municipality
- Elevation: 255 m (837 ft)
- Time zone: UTC+01:00 (CET)
  - Summer (DST): UTC+02:00 (CEST)
- Post Code: 2480 Koppang

Evenstad is a village in Stor-Elvdal Municipality in Innlandet county, Norway. The village is located along the Glomma river, about 20 kilometres (12 mi) south of the village of Koppang. The small village (it had a population of 77 in 2005 according to StatBank) is surrounded by forests, mountains and lakes. The village is the site of the Evenstad Church.

The Evenstad campus of the Inland Norway University of Applied Sciences is located in the village. This campus is where the Faculty of Forestry and Wilderness Management has about 220 students. It is the smallest campus within the university.

In May 1995, the river Glomma flooded which caused some damage in Evenstad.
