= Sollia Municipality =

Former municipality in Hedmark, Norway

Sollia Municipality Sollia herred
- Former municipality
- Solli herred (historic name); Sollien herred (historic name); Solliden herred (historic name)
- Hedmark within Norway

- Sollia within Hedmark
- Coordinates: 61°46′51″N 10°24′00″E
- Country: Norway
- County: Hedmark
- District: Østerdalen
- Established: 1 Jan 1864
  - Preceded by: Ringebu Municipality
- Disestablished: 1 Jan 1965
  - Succeeded by: Stor-Elvdal Municipality
- Administrative centre: Sollia

Area (upon dissolution)
  - Total: 512 km^{2} (198 sq mi)
  - Rank: #202 in Norway
- Highest elevation: 1,766.74 m (5,796.4 ft)

Population (1964)
  - Total: 377
  - Rank: #521 in Norway
  - Density: 0.7/km^{2} (1.8/sq mi)
  - Change (10 years): ▼ −14.5%

Official language
  - Norwegian form: Neutral
- Time zone: UTC+01:00 (CET)
  - Summer (DST): UTC+02:00 (CEST)
- ISO 3166 code: NO-0431

Sollia is a former municipality in the old Hedmark county, Norway. The 512-square-kilometre (198 sq mi) municipality existed from 1864 until its dissolution in 1965. The area is now part of Stor-Elvdal Municipality in the traditional district of Østerdalen. The administrative centre was the village of Sollia where Sollia Church is located.

Prior to its dissolution in 1965, the 512-square-kilometre (198 sq mi) municipality was the 202nd largest by area out of the 525 municipalities in Norway. Sollia Municipality was the 521st most populous municipality in Norway with a population of about 377. The municipality's population density was 0.7 inhabitants per square kilometre (1.8/sq mi) and its population had decreased by 14.5% over the previous 10-year period.

== General information ==
The parish of Solliden (population: 386), later spelled Sollia, was established as a municipality on 1 January 1864 when it was separated from Ringebu Municipality. The new municipality was originally part of Kristians amt (county) when it was established. On 1 January 1891, Solliden Municipality was transferred to the neighboring county: Hedemarkens amt. An uninhabited part of Ringebu Municipality was moved to Solliden Municipality on 1 January 1899. During the 1960s, there were many municipal mergers across Norway due to the work of the Schei Committee. On 1 January 1965, Sollia Municipality (population: 356) was merged into the neighboring Stor-Elvdal Municipality (population: 3,808).

=== Name ===
The municipality (originally the parish) is named after the old Sollia farm (Old Norse: Sóllið) since the first Sollia Church was built there. The first element is identical with the word sól which means "sun". The last element comes from the word hlíð which means "hillside" or "slope". Thus, the name means "the sunny hillside". Historically, the name of the municipality was spelled Solliden or Sollien. On 3 November 1917, a royal resolution changed the spelling of the name of the municipality to Solli. On 18 November 1921, a royal resolution changed the spelling of the name of the municipality to Sollia, effective 1 January 1922.

=== Churches ===
The Church of Norway had one parish (sokn) within Sollia Municipality. At the time of the municipal dissolution, it was part of the Sollia prestegjeld and the Sør-Østerdal prosti (deanery) in the Diocese of Hamar.

Churches in Sollia
Parish (sokn)	Church name	Location of the church	Year built
Sollia	Sollia Church	Sollia	1738

== Geography ==
The municipality was located to the southeast of the Rondane mountains, in the upper Atnedalen valley. Folldal Municipality and Alvdal Municipality were located to the north, Stor-Elvdal Municipality was located to the east, Ringebu Municipality (in Oppland county) was located to the south, Sør-Fron Municipality (also in Oppland county) was located to the west. The highest point in the municipality was the 1,766.74-metre (5,796.4 ft) tall mountain Gravskardhøgda, located in the far northern part of the municipality.

== Government ==
While it existed, Sollia Municipality was responsible for primary education (through 10th grade), outpatient health services, senior citizen services, welfare and other social services, zoning, economic development, and municipal roads and utilities. The municipality was governed by a municipal council of directly elected representatives. The mayor was indirectly elected by a vote of the municipal council. The municipality was under the jurisdiction of the Eidsivating Court of Appeal.

=== Municipal council ===
The municipal council (Herredsstyre) of Sollia Municipality was made up of representatives that were elected to four year terms. The tables below show the historical composition of the council by political party.

Sollia herredsstyre 1963–1965
Party name (in Norwegian)	Number of representatives
Labour Party (Arbeiderpartiet)	6
Joint List(s) of Non-Socialist Parties (Borgerlige Felleslister)	7
Total number of members:	13

Sollia herredsstyre 1959–1963
Party name (in Norwegian)	Number of representatives
Labour Party (Arbeiderpartiet)	7
Joint List(s) of Non-Socialist Parties (Borgerlige Felleslister)	6
Total number of members:	13

Sollia herredsstyre 1955–1959
Party name (in Norwegian)	Number of representatives
Labour Party (Arbeiderpartiet)	7
Joint List(s) of Non-Socialist Parties (Borgerlige Felleslister)	6
Total number of members:	13

Sollia herredsstyre 1951–1955
Party name (in Norwegian)	Number of representatives
Labour Party (Arbeiderpartiet)	6
Joint List(s) of Non-Socialist Parties (Borgerlige Felleslister)	6
Total number of members:	12

Sollia herredsstyre 1947–1951
Party name (in Norwegian)	Number of representatives
Labour Party (Arbeiderpartiet)	6
Joint List(s) of Non-Socialist Parties (Borgerlige Felleslister)	6
Total number of members:	12

Sollia herredsstyre 1945–1947
Party name (in Norwegian)	Number of representatives
Labour Party (Arbeiderpartiet)	6
Joint List(s) of Non-Socialist Parties (Borgerlige Felleslister)	6
Total number of members:	12

Sollia herredsstyre 1938–1941*
Party name (in Norwegian)	Number of representatives
Labour Party (Arbeiderpartiet)	5
Conservative Party (Høyre)	1
Farmers' Party (Bondepartiet)	4
Liberal Party (Venstre)	2
Total number of members:	12
Note: Due to the German occupation of Norway during World War II, no elections were held for new municipal councils until after the war ended in 1945.

=== Mayors ===
The mayor (Norwegian: ordfører) of Sollia Municipality was the political leader of the municipality and the chairperson of the municipal council. The following people have held this position (incomplete list):

- 1871–1871: O.L. Olsen
- 1872–1878: Auden Sollien
- 1879–1882: Ole E. Brænd
- 1882–1897: Engbret O. Brænd
- 1898–1904: Anton E. Brænd
- 1905–1908: P. Kulstad
- 1908–1910: Aksel Løchen
- 1911–1916: P.G. Lien
- 1916–1941: Olav Knutson (V)
- 1941–1945: Asbjørn Brænd (NS)
- 1945–1946: Einar Brænd
- 1946–1947: Martinus Knutson (Ap)
- 1947–1951: Harald E. Negaard (LL)
- 1951–1959: Martinus Knutson (Ap)
- 1960–1963: Lars Modahl (Ap)

== See also ==
- List of former municipalities of Norway
