= Ole-Anton Teigen =

Norwegian politician

Ole-Anton Teigen (born 15 July 1954) is a Norwegian politician for the Socialist Left Party.

Born in Lyngen Municipality in Troms county, he got his higher education degree in 1979. He was a member of the municipal council of Lyngen Municipality from 1991 to 2007, and of Troms county council from 2003 to 2007. He served as a deputy representative to the Norwegian Parliament from Troms during the terms 2001–2005 and 2005–2009.

From 2001 he is also a member of Nord-Hålogaland assize court. From 2007 to 2010 he is the chair of the Norwegian Farmers and Smallholders Union.

Non-profit organization positions
| Preceded by Knut Sjøvold (acting) | Chair of the Norwegian Farmers and Smallholders Union; 2007-2010 | Succeeded by Ann Merete Furuberg |
