= Koppang Church =

Church in Innlandet, Norway

- Koppang kirke
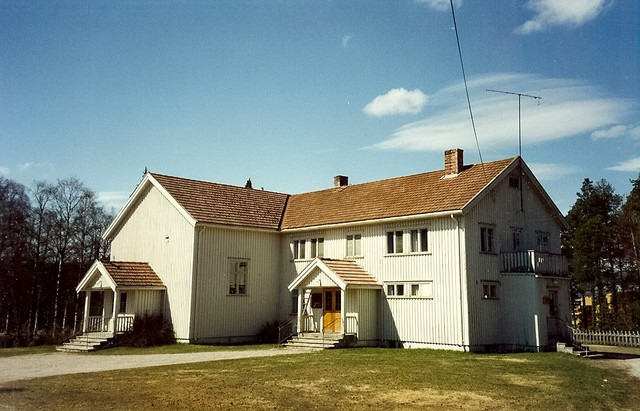
- View of the church
- Koppang Church
- 61°34′35″N 11°02′13″E
- Location: Stor-Elvdal Municipality, Innlandet
- Country: Norway
- Denomination: Church of Norway
- Churchmanship: Evangelical Lutheran

History
- Status: Chapel
- Founded: 1952
- Consecrated: 6 September 1953

Architecture
- Functional status: Active
- Architect: Ivar Ulvmoen
- Architectural type: Long church
- Completed: 1952 (74 years ago)

Specifications
- Capacity: 120
- Materials: Wood

Administration
- Diocese: Hamar bispedømme
- Deanery: Sør-Østerdal prosti
- Parish: Stor-Elvdal
- Norwegian Cultural Heritage Site
- Type: Church
- Status: Not protected
- ID: 84818

Koppang Church (Norwegian: Koppang kirke) is a chapel of the Church of Norway in Stor-Elvdal Municipality in Innlandet county, Norway. It is located in the town of Koppang. It is an annex chapel for the Stor-Elvdal parish which is part of the Sør-Østerdal prosti (deanery) in the Diocese of Hamar. The white, wooden church was built in 1952 using plans drawn up by the architect Ivar Ulvmoen. The church seats about 120 people.

== History ==
The chapel was approved for construction in 1945, but the implementation took time. The chapel was designed by Ivar Ulvmoen and built in 1952. The chapel also houses the parish offices. The new building was consecrated on 6 September 1953 by the Bishop Kristian Schjelderup.

== See also ==
- List of churches in Hamar
