= University of Inland Norway =

State university in Innlandet, Norway

- Universitetet i Innlandet
- Former names: Inland Norway University of Applied Sciences, Hedmark University College, Lillehammer University College (merged)
- Motto: Sterkere sammen (Bokmål)
- Motto in English: "Stronger Together"
- Type: University
- Established: January 1, 2017; 9 years ago
- Rector: Peer Jacob Svenkerud
- Academic staff: 1,094 (2020)
- Students: 15,985 (2020)
- Location: Innlandet, Norway
- Campus: Multiple sites
- Colors: Green
- Website: inn.no

Sites of the university in Innlandet

The University of Inland Norway (also known as INN University, Norwegian: Universitetet i Innlandet) is a state university in Innlandet county, Norway. It was established in 2017 as the Inland Norway University of Applied Sciences, from the merger of the Hedmark University College and Lillehammer University College. It has six campuses, of which the campus in Lillehammer is the biggest, located at the television and radio center built for the 1994 Winter Olympic Games.

== History ==
The university was formed on 1 January 2017 from the merger of Hedmark University College and Lillehammer University College. The rector is Peer Jacob Svenkerud.

The university had applied to receive official university status in 2018, but this was rejected by the Norwegian Agency for Quality Assurance in Education in January 2020. It applied again in 2024, with the application being granted by the Norwegian Agency for Quality Assurance in Education, thereby making it the University of Inland Norway (Universitet i Innlandet).

== Locations ==
The university has campuses in Blæstad, Elverum, Evenstad, Hamar, Lillehammer, and Rena. It has faculties spread across all sites, with approximately 16,000 students and 1,100 employees.

== Education ==
The university offers 46 Bachelor's degree programs, with several taught in English. The university also offers 32 Master's degree programs and a choice of 6 PhDs.

The main teaching and research areas are ecology and agricultural sciences, psychology, sports, law, music, health sciences, social sciences, teacher education, language and literature, biotechnology, film, television and culture, tourism, animation and game sciences, economics, and leadership and innovation.

=== The Norwegian Film School ===
The Norwegian Film School is a faculty at INN University, founded as part of the university in 1997 in the facilities that hosted the media center during the 1994 Winter Olympics. The school had new facilities built in 2004.

== PhD programmes ==
The university has the following PhD programmes:

- Applied Ecology and Biotechnology
- Artistic Research in film and related audio-visual art forms
- Child and Youth Competence Development
- Health and Welfare
- Innovation in Services in the Public and Private Sectors
- Teaching and Teacher Education
