= Tromsø University College =

Defunct university college in Tromsø, Norway

Coordinates: 69.6799°N 18.9717°E

- Høgskolen i Tromsø
- Type: University college
- Active: 1 August 1995–31 December 2008
- Administrative staff: 300 (at close)
- Students: 3,000 (at close)
- Location: Tromsø, Norway
- Website: www.hitos.no

Tromsø University College (Norwegian: "Høgskolen i Tromsø, HiTø") was a university college located in Tromsø, Norway. It offered programs in a variety of fields, including health care, engineering, business administration, teaching, and music, dance, and drama. The college was founded in 1994 as part of the University College reform, which merged four previously autonomous state colleges into one regional college. These colleges were Tromsø Teacher College, Tromsø Maritime College, Tromsø Nursing College, and Northern Norway Music Conservatory.

Tromsø University College students had access to a variety of support services, including healthcare, housing, and recreational activities.

In 2009, Tromsø University College was incorporated into the University of Tromsø, which is now known as UiT The Arctic University of Norway. This merger was part of a larger effort to streamline higher education in Norway and improve the quality of university-level education across the country. Today, the University of Tromsø offers a wide range of undergraduate and graduate programs in fields ranging from the humanities and social sciences to natural sciences and technology.
