= Torkel Andreas Trønnes =

Norwegian automobile advocate (1925–2011)

Torkel Andreas Trønnes (17 March 1925 – 4 October 2011) was a Norwegian automobile advocate.

In his younger days he was a rally driver, among others participating in the three times. He spent thirty years of his professional career as a technical director in Kongelig Norsk Automobilklub. He also wrote in their member magazine Motorliv. He later worked two decades in the men's magazine Vi Menn. He also became known for an attempt to petition politicians, in the campaign "Nei til høyere Bensinpriser" ('No to Higher Gas Prices'). The petition was signed by 370,000. He was also involved in the Norwegian Motor Trade Association and Trygg Trafikk.

He resides in Koppang.
