= Steinar Ness =

Norwegian politician (born 1959)

Steinar Gudmund Ness (born 10 February 1959) is a Norwegian politician for the Centre Party.

He was born in Viksdalen. From 1984 to 1985 he was the leader of the Centre Youth, the youth wing of the Centre Party. He would later become general secretary in the Centre Party from 1991 to 1997. He served as a deputy representative to the Parliament of Norway from Sogn og Fjordane during the terms 1981–1985 and 1985–1989. In 1989, when Syse's Cabinet assumed office, he was appointed State Secretary in the Ministry of the Environment. He held this position until 1990, when Syse's Cabinet fell. From 1997 to 1999, under the Bondevik's First Cabinet, he was a political adviser in the Ministry of Culture. He was a member of the municipal council of Gaular Municipality from 1999.

He is the deputy chair of Riksteatret since 2003. He was the deputy chair of the Broadcasting Council from 2006 to 2009. In 2010 he became a board member of the Norwegian Broadcasting Corporation.

In 2017 he was again elected as deputy representative to the Parliament of Norway.

Party political offices
Preceded by	Leader of the Centre Youth; 1984–1986	Succeeded by
Preceded by	Secretary-general of the Centre Party; 1991–1997	Succeeded by Per Olaf Lundteigen
