= Bjarne Holen =

Norwegian politician (1925–2021)

Bjarne Holen (13 June 1925 – 28 January 2021) was a Norwegian politician for the Labour Party.

He served as a deputy representative to the Parliament of Norway from Hedmark during the terms 1965–1969 and 1969–1973. In total he met during 6 days of parliamentary session. He enrolled in the Labour Party in 1945, and eventually became mayor of Stor-Elvdal Municipality. In his working career he became chief administrative officer of Åmot Municipality.
