= Norwegian Farmers and Smallholders Union =

Norwegian trade union for farmers

Norwegian Farmers and Smallholders Union Norsk Bonde- og Småbrukarlag
- Abbreviation: NBS
- Formation: 1913
- Type: NGO
- Purpose: Farming
- Headquarters: Oslo
- Region served: Norway
- Members: 6,295 (2021)
- Chair: Tor Jacob Solberg
- Website: https://smabrukarlaget.no

The Norwegian Farmers and Smallholders Union (Norwegian: Norsk Bonde- og Småbrukarlag) is an interest organization for farmers in Norway.

It is a labour union and a trade union, founded in 1913, and negotiates with the Norwegian Agrarian Association against the Norwegian Ministry of Labour and Social Inclusion about agricultural subsidies.

Its secretary-general is Vilde Haarsaker, and its chair is Tor Jacob Solberg. It has 7,000 members, with 260 local chapters and 18 county chapters. The headquarters are in Oslo and the newsletter is Bonde og Småbruker.

== Chairman ==
- 1913–1918 Halvdan Cock-Jensen
- 1918–1919 Ingebrigt Five
- 1919–1921 Thore Myrvang
- 1921–1924 Carl Borgen
- 1924–1925 Thore Myrvang
- 1925–1933 Halvdan Egeberg
- 1933–1947 Sigvart Gulbrandsen
- 1947–1951 Anton Berge
- 1951–1956 Ole E. Noem
- 1956–1964 Peder Jacobsen
- 1964–1974 Kjell G. Jacobsen
- 1982–1986 Lars O. Romtveit
- 1986–1992 Per Olaf Lundteigen
- 1992–1996 Aina Bartmann
- 1996–1998 Torgeir Strøm
- 1998–2000 Svein Kostveit
- 2000–2002 Arne Vinje
- 2002–2004 Geir Grosberg
- 2004–2006 Solveig Horve
- 2006–2007 Anne Osland
- 2007–2010 Ole-Anton Teigen
- 2010–2018 Ann Merete Furuberg
- 2018–2022 Kjersti Hoff
- 2022– Tor Jacob Solberg
