= Lillehammer University College =

University college in Lillehammer, Norway

Coordinates: 61°08′59″N 10°25′22″E

- Høgskolen i Lillehammer
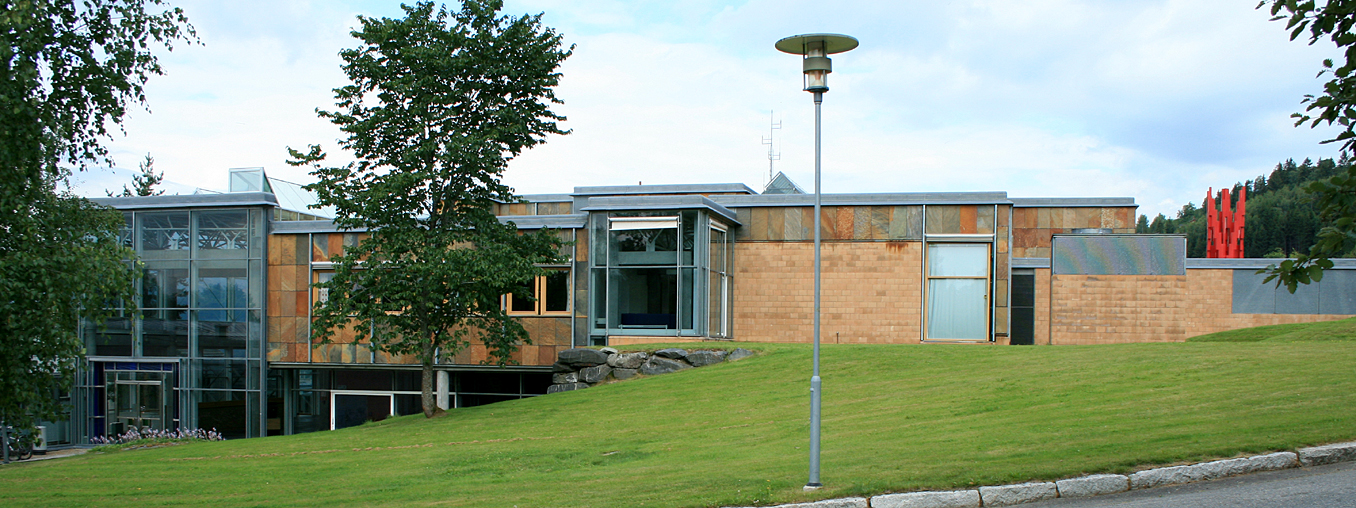
- Høgskolen i Lillehammer
- Active: 1994–2017
- Location: Lillehammer, Norway

Lillehammer University College (Norwegian: Høgskolen i Lillehammer) was a state university college located at Storhove in Lillehammer, Norway. It was merged with Hedmark University College to become the Inland Norway University of Applied Sciences in 2017.

== History ==
In 1970, Oppland College (Norwegian: Oppland distriktshøgskole) was established in Lillehammer, at the site of a defunct agricultural college. The college was transformed into the Lillehammer University College in 1994, in connection with the university college reform. It was located in the television and radio center built for the 1994 Winter Olympic Games, and offered undergraduate programs in travel and tourism, business administration, organisation and management, film and television, health and social work, humanities and social sciences, and graduate programs in education, social policy, health and social work for children and youth, social welfare, and film and television science.

From 1 January 2017, the Inland Norway University of Applied Sciences began operations on six campuses in south-eastern Norway: Lillehammer, Hamar, Blæstad, Elverum, Rena and Evenstad.

== The Norwegian Film School ==
The Norwegian Film School, the first film school in Norway, was founded as part of the college in 1997 in the facilities that hosted the media center during the 1994 Winter Olympics. The school had new facilities built in 2004.
