= Per Olaf Lundteigen =

Norwegian politician (born 1953)

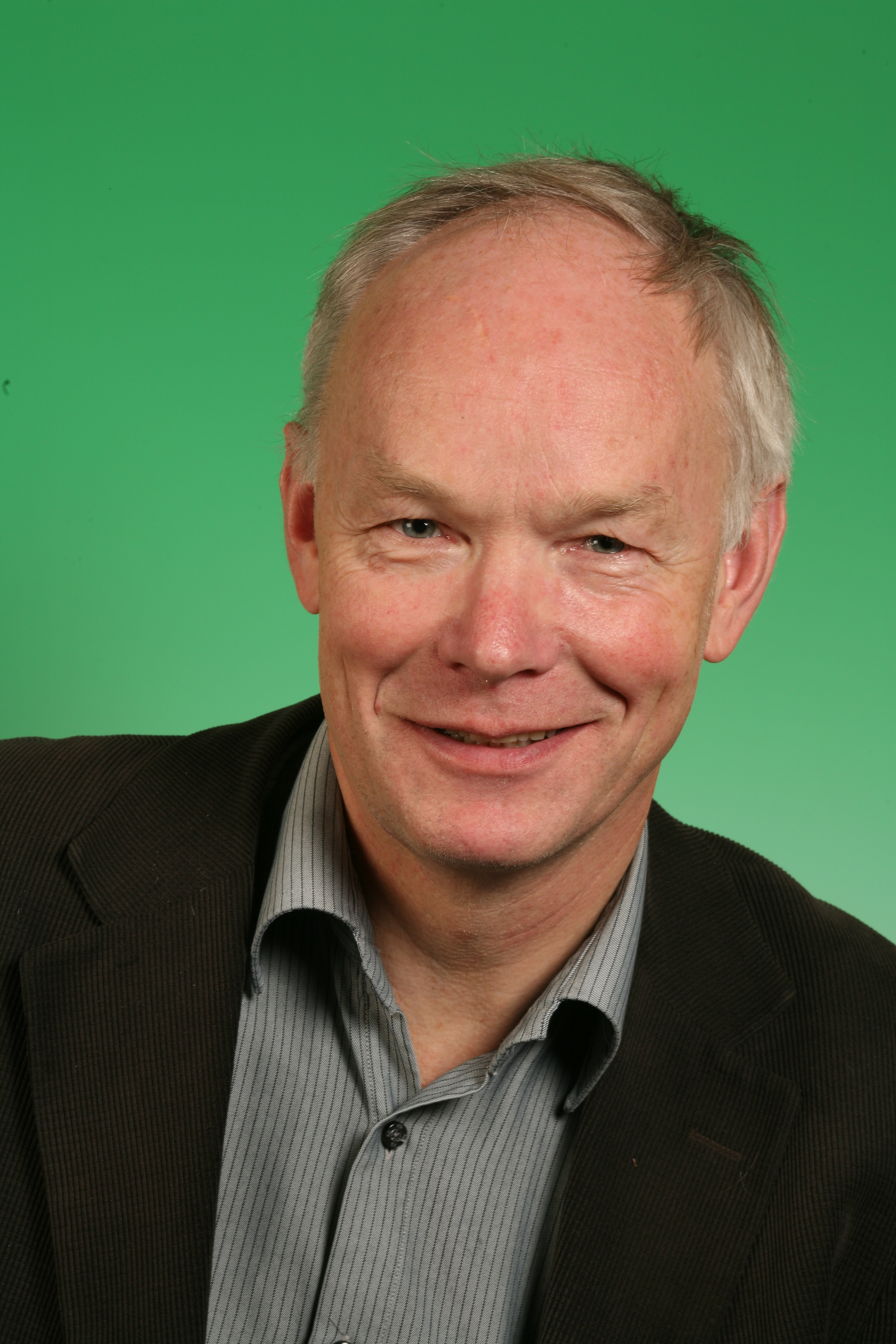
Per Olaf Lundteigen

Per Olaf Lundteigen (born 18 April 1953) is a Norwegian farmer for the Centre Party.

== Career ==
He was born in Vestfossen, took his secondary education in Hokksund in 1972 and the cand.agric. degree at the Norwegian College of Agriculture in 1977. From 1977 to 1979 he worked as a secretary in the Norwegian Agrarian Association. After three years in Ringebu Municipality, he settled as a farmer in 1982. From 1986 to 1992 he chaired the Norwegian Farmers' and Smallholders' Union.

He was elected to the Norwegian Parliament from Buskerud in 1993. Not re-elected in 1997, he was secretary general in his party for two years. From 1999 to 2000, while the first cabinet Bondevik held office, he was a State Secretary in the Ministry of Local Government. From 2000 to 2003 he chaired the county chapter of his party, and from 2003 to 2007 he served in the municipal council of Øvre Eiker Municipality. In 2005 he was elected to the Norwegian Parliament for a second term. During both terms he has been a member of the Standing Committee of Finance. He has been re-elected at every election since. In May 2024, he announced that he wouldn't seek re-election in 2025.

Non-profit organization positions
Preceded by Lars O. Romtveit	Leader of the Norwegian Farmers and Smallholders Union; 1986–1992	Succeeded by Aina Edelmann
Party political offices
Preceded by Steinar Ness	Secretary-general of the Centre Party; 1997–2000	Succeeded by Kjell Dahle
