= Hedmark University College =

Former higher education institution in Norway

Hedmark University of Applied Sciences
- Høgskolen i Hedmark
- Active: 1994–2017
- Location: Hedmark, Norway

Hedmark University of Applied Sciences (Norwegian: Høgskolen i Hedmark) was a state university college in Hedmark, Norway, established in 1994. The college had approximately 5,250 students and 450 employees. It was merged with Lillehammer University College to become the Inland Norway University of Applied Sciences in 2017. It had four campuses located in:

- Hamar in Hamar Municipality
- Elverum in Elverum Municipality
- Rena in Åmot Municipality
- Evenstad in Stor-Elvdal Municipality

The university was divided into four faculties: the Faculty of Health and Sports, the Faculty of Education and Natural Sciences Design, the Faculty of Forestry and Wildlife Management, and the Faculty of Business Administration, Social Sciences and Computer Science.
