= Ole Olsen Evenstad (born 1775) =

Norwegian politician

Ole Olsen Evenstad (1781 – 16 April 1833) was a Norwegian politician.

He was elected to the first session of the Norwegian Parliament in 1833, representing the constituency of Hedemarkens Amt. He worked as a farmer there. He was supposed to report to the Storting in the capital on February 1 1833, but had fallen ill and Jakob Nilsen Hoel took his place. He died 10 weeks later. He is often confused with his older brother, Ole Olsen Evenstad (born 1766), who died in February 1833.
