= Torkel Lillefosse =

Norwegian botanist

Torkel Knutsen Lillefosse (5 July 1868 – 9 January 1946) was a Norwegian botanist.

He was born at Strandebarm Municipality in Søndre Bergenhus, Norway. After working as a wood carver and gardener, he turned to botany. From 1921 he received an annual state grant for his research. He only researched the flora of Western Norway, and his collection of plants from Hordaland and Sogn og Fjordane was and is unique.
