= Norwegian Poultry Association =

Norwegian professional association for poultry farming

- Norsk Fjørfelag
- Logo of Norsk Fjørfelag
- Formation: 27 June 1884; 140 years ago
- Headquarters: Oslo, Norway
- Chairman: Ingunn Dalaker Øderud
- Deputy Chairman: Tone Steinsland
- Website: nfl.no

The Norwegian Poultry Association (Norwegian: Norsk Fjørfelag) is the largest Norwegian professional association for poultry farming, with approximately 950 members organised into 12 regional teams as of 2018.

== History ==
The Norwegian Poultry Association was founded on 27 June 1884 as the Norwegian Poultry Breeding Association (Norwegian: Norsk fjørfeavlslag).

The association's first concern after formation was improving the quality of the Norwegian chicken stock, and began to import chickens from abroad.

=== 21st Century ===
In November 2019, the association attributed a decline in the consumption of white meat in Norway to a rise in vegetarianism.

Ingunn Dalaker Øderud became the association's first female chairperson in March 2021, succeeding Kolbjørn Frøseth.

In May 2020, the association called for economic support from the Minister of Agriculture and Food for poultry farmers in response to the COVID-19 pandemic.
