= Sollia =

Village in Stor-Elvdal Municipality, Norway

- Village
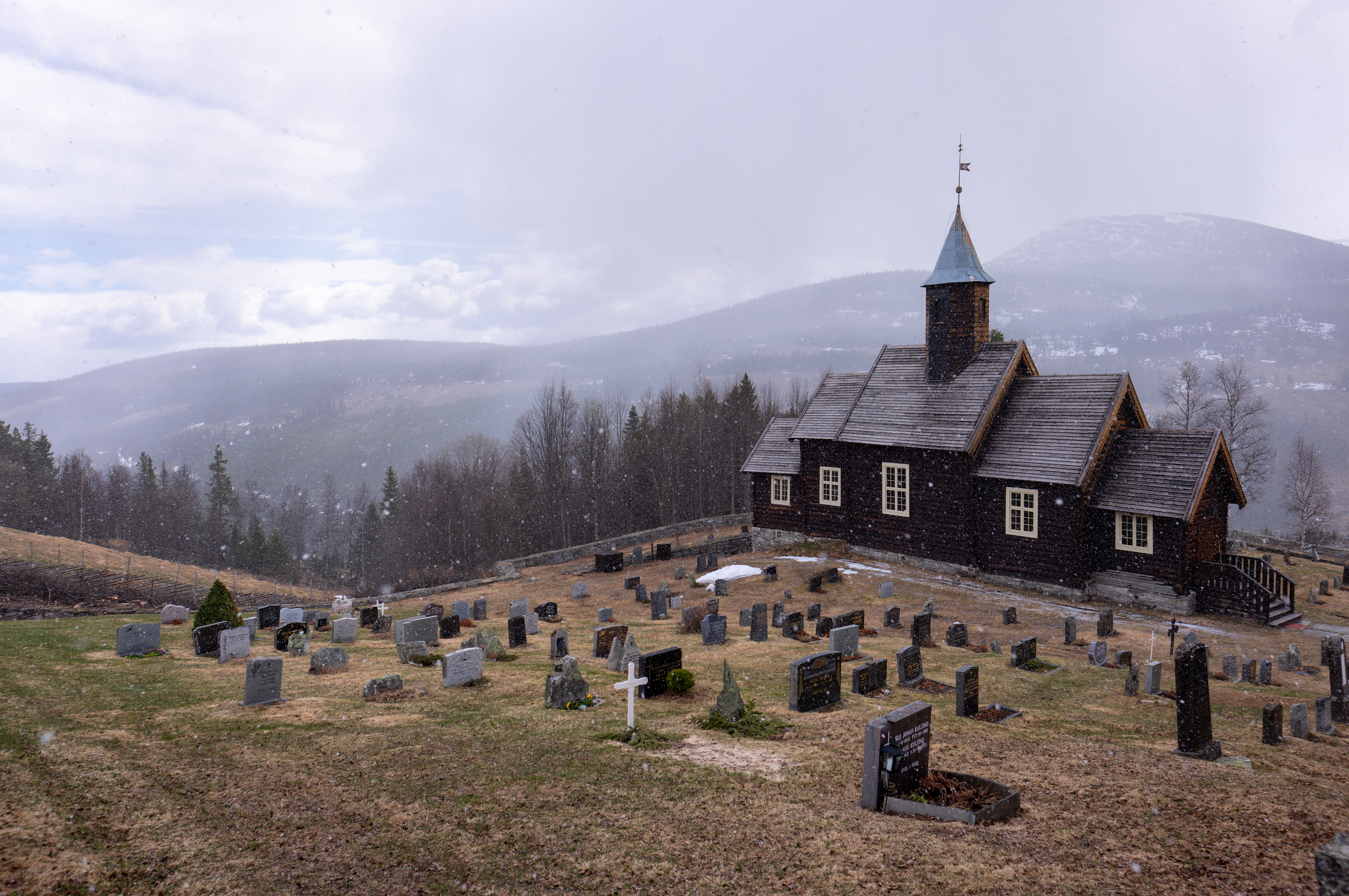
- View of the village church
- Interactive map of Sollia
- Location within Innlandet Location within Norway
- Coordinates: 61.78081°N 10.39994°E
- Country: Norway
- Region: Eastern Norway
- County: Innlandet
- District: Østerdalen
- Municipality: Stor-Elvdal Municipality
- Elevation: 769 m (2,523 ft)
- Time zone: UTC+01:00 (CET)
  - Summer (DST): UTC+02:00 (CEST)
- Post Code: 2477

Sollia is a village in Stor-Elvdal Municipality in Innlandet county, Norway. The village is located just up the hill from the Setninga river, about 48 kilometres (30 mi) northwest of the village of Koppang and about 40 kilometres (25 mi) north of the village of Ringebu. Sollia Church is located in the long, narrow village. The County Road 219 runs through the small village. Historically, this village was the administrative centre of the old Sollia Municipality.

== Name ==
The first element is sol which means "the Sun" and the last element is the finite form of li which means "hillside". Thus, the name means "the sunny hillside".
