= Stor-Elvdal Municipality =

Municipality in Innlandet, Norway

Stor-Elvdal Municipality Stor-Elvdal kommune
- Municipality
- Stor-Elvdalen herred (historic name); Store Elvdalen herred (historic name)
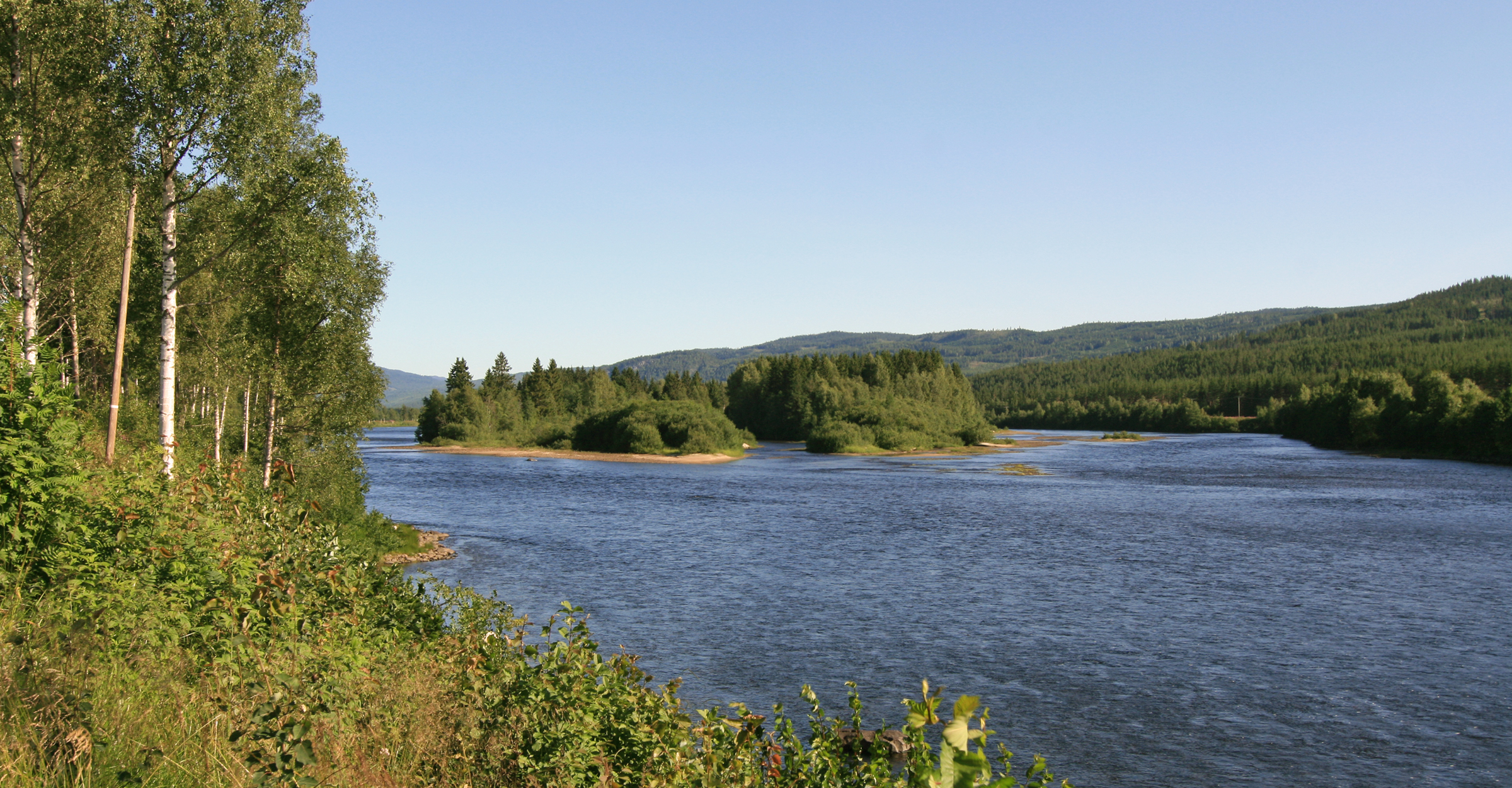
- The river Glomma running through the municipality

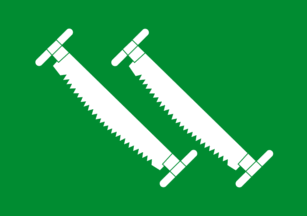
- Flag Coat of arms

- Innlandet within Norway

- Stor-Elvdal within Innlandet
- Coordinates: 61°38′6″N 10°52′27″E
- Country: Norway
- County: Innlandet
- District: Østerdalen
- Established: 1 Jan 1838
  - Created as: Formannskapsdistrikt
- Administrative centre: Koppang

Government
  - Mayor (2023): Linda Otnes Henriksen (Ap)

Area
  - Total: 2,165.77 km^{2} (836.21 sq mi)
  - Land: 2,127 km^{2} (821 sq mi)
  - Water: 38.77 km^{2} (14.97 sq mi) 1.8%
  - Rank: #29 in Norway
- Highest elevation: 1,766.74 m (5,796.4 ft)

Population (2025)
  - Total: 2,250
  - Rank: #267 in Norway
  - Density: 1/km^{2} (2.6/sq mi)
  - Change (10 years): ▼ −15.7%
- Demonym: Storelvdøl

Official language
  - Norwegian form: Bokmål
- Time zone: UTC+01:00 (CET)
  - Summer (DST): UTC+02:00 (CEST)
- ISO 3166 code: NO-3423
- Website: Official website

Stor-Elvdal is a municipality in Innlandet county, Norway. It is located in the traditional district of Østerdalen. The administrative centre of the municipality is the village of Koppang. Other villages in the municipality include Atna, Evenstad, and Sollia.

The 2,166-square-kilometre (836 sq mi) municipality is the 29th largest by area out of the 357 municipalities in Norway. Stor-Elvdal Municipality is the 267th most populous municipality in Norway with a population of 2,250. The municipality's population density is 1 inhabitant per square kilometre (2.6/sq mi) and its population has decreased by 15.7% over the previous 10-year period.

== General information ==
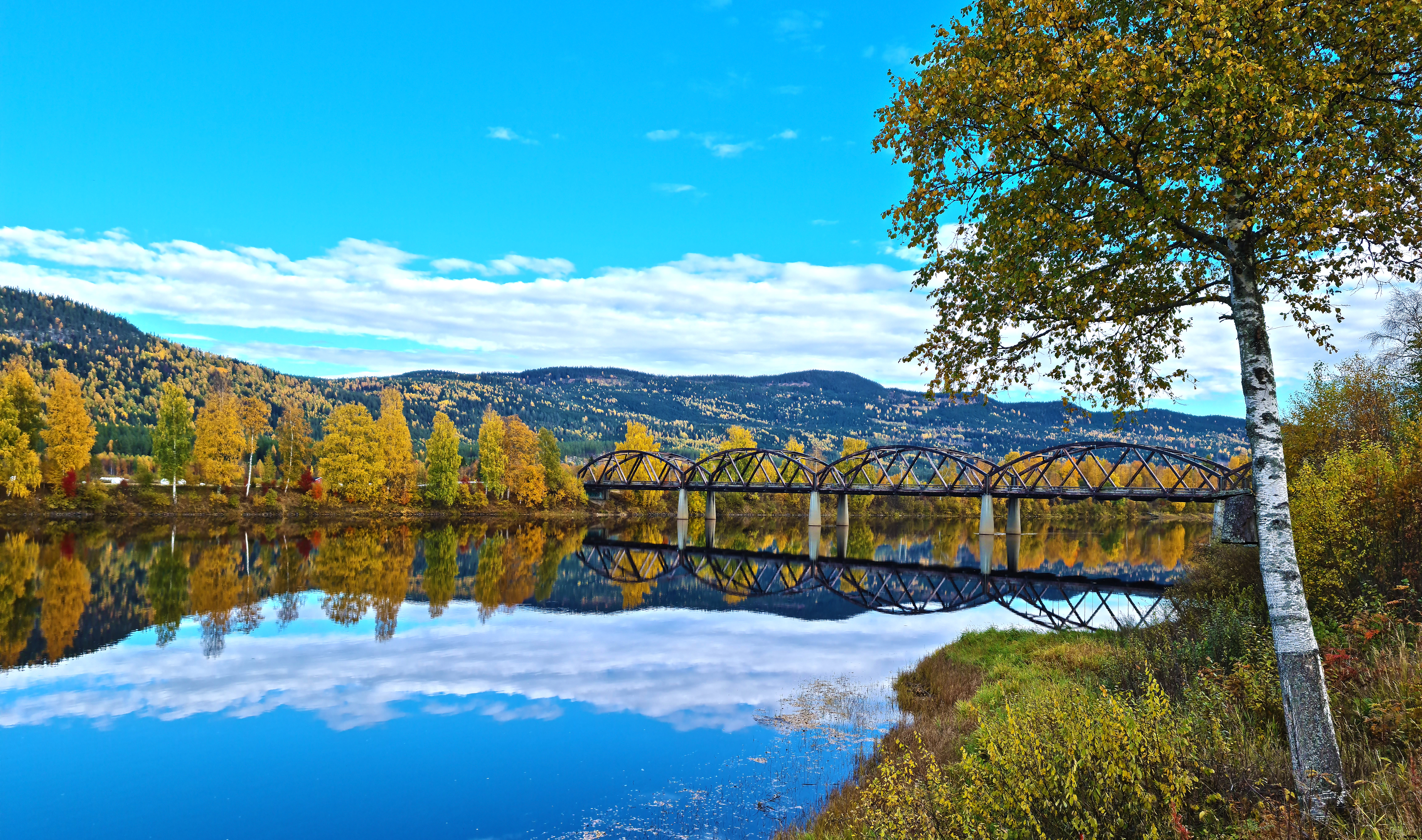
View of the Evenstad Bridge over the river Glomma

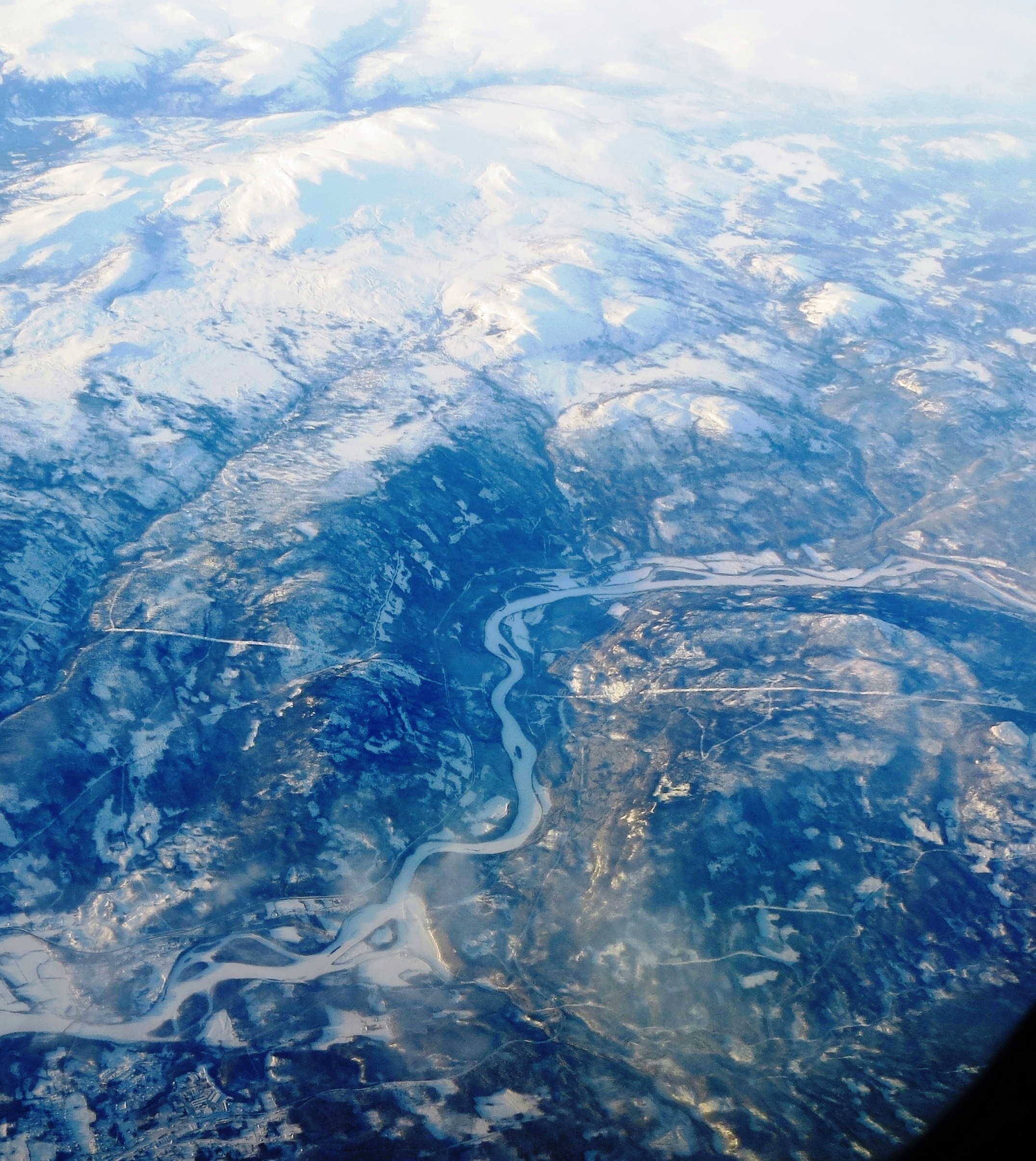
Aerial view of the valley just north of Koppang

The parish of Store Elvedalen was established as a municipality on 1 January 1838 (see formannskapsdistrikt law). During the 1960s, there were many municipal mergers across Norway due to the work of the Schei Committee. On 1 January 1965, the neighboring Sollia Municipality (population: 356) was merged with Stor-Elvdal Municipality (population: 3,808) to form a new, larger Stor-Elvdal Municipality.

Historically, the municipality was part of Hedmark county. On 1 January 2020, the municipality became a part of the newly-formed Innlandet county (after Hedmark and Oppland counties were merged).

=== Name ===
The municipality (originally the parish) is named Stor-Elvdal after the large Elvdalen valley (Old Norse: Elfardalr) which was the historical name for the whole area. The first element is the genitive case of the word elfr which means "river", referring to the river Glomma which flows through the valley. The last element is dalr which means "valley" or "dale". Thus this word means "river valley". The name also includes the prefix stor which means "big". This prefix was added to the old name "Elvdalen" to distinguish it from the nearby Lille-Elvdalen Municipality ("little Elvdalen", later the name was shortened to Alvdal Municipality). In the late Middle Ages the two areas were distinguished using the words Ytre Elvdalen (meaning "outer" Elvdalen) and Øvre Elvdalen (meaning "upper" Elvdalen). Historically, the name of the municipality was spelled Store Elvdalen or Stor-Elvedalen. On 3 November 1917, a royal resolution changed the spelling of the name of the municipality to Stor-Elvdal, removing the definite form ending -en.

=== Coat of arms ===
The coat of arms was granted on 12 February 1988. The official blazon is "Vert, two wood saws argent bendwise" (Norwegian: I grønt to skråstilte sølv tømmersager). This means the arms have a green field (background) and the charge is two diagonal two-man saws. The charge has a tincture of argent which means it is commonly colored white, but if it is made out of metal, then silver is used. The design and color were chosen to symbolize the importance of forestry in the municipality. The arms were designed by Even Jarl Skoglund. The municipal flag has the same design as the coat of arms.

=== Churches ===
The Church of Norway has four parishes (sokn) within Stor-Elvdal Municipality. It is part of the Sør-Østerdal prosti (deanery) in the Diocese of Hamar.

Churches in Stor-Elvdal
Parish (sokn)	Church name	Location of the church	Year built
Atneosen	Atneosen Church	Atna	1882
Sollia	Sollia Church	Sollia	1738
Stor-Elvdal	Evenstad Church	Evenstad	1904
Stor-Elvdal	Koppang Church	Koppang	1952
Stor-Elvdal	Stor-Elvdal Church	Negardshaugen	1821
Strand	Strand Church	Strand	1863

== Government ==
Stor-Elvdal Municipality is responsible for primary education (through 10th grade), outpatient health services, senior citizen services, welfare and other social services, zoning, economic development, and municipal roads and utilities. The municipality is governed by a municipal council of directly elected representatives. The mayor is indirectly elected by a vote of the municipal council. The municipality is under the jurisdiction of the Hedmarken og Østerdal District Court and the Eidsivating Court of Appeal.

=== Municipal council ===
The municipal council (Kommunestyre) of Stor-Elvdal Municipality is made up of 17 representatives that are elected to four year terms. The tables below show the current and historical composition of the council by political party.

Stor-Elvdal kommunestyre 2023–2027
Party name (in Norwegian)	Number of representatives
Labour Party (Arbeiderpartiet)	6
Progress Party (Fremskrittspartiet)	1
Conservative Party (Høyre)	2
Red Party (Rødt)	1
Centre Party (Senterpartiet)	2
Socialist Left Party (Sosialistisk Venstreparti)	2
Liberal Party (Venstre)	3
Total number of members:	17

Stor-Elvdal kommunestyre 2019–2023
Party name (in Norwegian)	Number of representatives
Labour Party (Arbeiderpartiet)	6
Progress Party (Fremskrittspartiet)	1
Conservative Party (Høyre)	2
Centre Party (Senterpartiet)	5
Socialist Left Party (Sosialistisk Venstreparti)	2
Liberal Party (Venstre)	1
Total number of members:	17

Stor-Elvdal kommunestyre 2015–2019
Party name (in Norwegian)	Number of representatives
Labour Party (Arbeiderpartiet)	9
Socialist Left Party (Sosialistisk Venstreparti)	1
Liberal Party (Venstre)	3
Joint list of the Conservative Party (Høyre), Centre Party (Senterpartiet), and Progress Party (Fremskrittspartiet)	4
Total number of members:	17

Stor-Elvdal kommunestyre 2011–2015
Party name (in Norwegian)	Number of representatives
Labour Party (Arbeiderpartiet)	9
Progress Party (Fremskrittspartiet)	1
Conservative Party (Høyre)	3
Centre Party (Senterpartiet)	2
Socialist Left Party (Sosialistisk Venstreparti)	1
Liberal Party (Venstre)	1
Local List for Stor-Elvdal (Bygdelista i Stor-Elvdal)	4
Total number of members:	21

Stor-Elvdal kommunestyre 2007–2011
Party name (in Norwegian)	Number of representatives
Labour Party (Arbeiderpartiet)	8
Progress Party (Fremskrittspartiet)	1
Conservative Party (Høyre)	3
Centre Party (Senterpartiet)	3
Socialist Left Party (Sosialistisk Venstreparti)	1
Local List for Stor-Elvdal (Bygdelista i Stor-Elvdal)	5
Total number of members:	21

Stor-Elvdal kommunestyre 2003–2007
Party name (in Norwegian)	Number of representatives
Labour Party (Arbeiderpartiet)	8
Progress Party (Fremskrittspartiet)	1
Conservative Party (Høyre)	2
Centre Party (Senterpartiet)	3
Socialist Left Party (Sosialistisk Venstreparti)	1
Local List for Stor-Elvdal (Bygdelista i Stor-Elvdal)	6
Total number of members:	21

Stor-Elvdal kommunestyre 1999–2003
Party name (in Norwegian)	Number of representatives
Labour Party (Arbeiderpartiet)	10
Conservative Party (Høyre)	1
Centre Party (Senterpartiet)	2
Liberal Party (Venstre)	1
Local List for Stor-Elvdal (Bygdelista i Stor-Elvdal)	7
Total number of members:	21

Stor-Elvdal kommunestyre 1995–1999
Party name (in Norwegian)	Number of representatives
Labour Party (Arbeiderpartiet)	11
Conservative Party (Høyre)	2
Centre Party (Senterpartiet)	3
Socialist Left Party (Sosialistisk Venstreparti)	1
Liberal Party (Venstre)	1
Stor-Elvdal in my heart (Stor-Elvdal i mitt hjerte)	9
Total number of members:	27

Stor-Elvdal kommunestyre 1991–1995
Party name (in Norwegian)	Number of representatives
Labour Party (Arbeiderpartiet)	12
Conservative Party (Høyre)	3
Centre Party (Senterpartiet)	4
Socialist Left Party (Sosialistisk Venstreparti)	7
Liberal Party (Venstre)	1
Total number of members:	27

Stor-Elvdal kommunestyre 1987–1991
Party name (in Norwegian)	Number of representatives
Labour Party (Arbeiderpartiet)	16
Conservative Party (Høyre)	4
Centre Party (Senterpartiet)	3
Socialist Left Party (Sosialistisk Venstreparti)	3
Liberal Party (Venstre)	1
Total number of members:	27

Stor-Elvdal kommunestyre 1983–1987
Party name (in Norwegian)	Number of representatives
Labour Party (Arbeiderpartiet)	18
Conservative Party (Høyre)	4
Centre Party (Senterpartiet)	3
Socialist Left Party (Sosialistisk Venstreparti)	2
Total number of members:	27

Stor-Elvdal kommunestyre 1979–1983
Party name (in Norwegian)	Number of representatives
Labour Party (Arbeiderpartiet)	16
Conservative Party (Høyre)	4
Centre Party (Senterpartiet)	4
Socialist Left Party (Sosialistisk Venstreparti)	3
Total number of members:	27

Stor-Elvdal kommunestyre 1975–1979
Party name (in Norwegian)	Number of representatives
Labour Party (Arbeiderpartiet)	18
Conservative Party (Høyre)	2
Centre Party (Senterpartiet)	5
Socialist Left Party (Sosialistisk Venstreparti)	2
Total number of members:	27

Stor-Elvdal kommunestyre 1971–1975
Party name (in Norwegian)	Number of representatives
Labour Party (Arbeiderpartiet)	18
Conservative Party (Høyre)	2
Centre Party (Senterpartiet)	5
Socialist common list (Venstresosialistiske felleslister)	2
Total number of members:	27

Stor-Elvdal kommunestyre 1967–1971
Party name (in Norwegian)	Number of representatives
Labour Party (Arbeiderpartiet)	17
Conservative Party (Høyre)	2
Centre Party (Senterpartiet)	5
Socialist People's Party (Sosialistisk Folkeparti)	3
Total number of members:	27

Stor-Elvdal kommunestyre 1963–1967
Party name (in Norwegian)	Number of representatives
Labour Party (Arbeiderpartiet)	16
Conservative Party (Høyre)	2
Communist Party (Kommunistiske Parti)	2
Centre Party (Senterpartiet)	3
Total number of members:	23
Note: On 1 January 1965, Sollia Municipality became part of Stor-Elvdal Municipality.

Stor-Elvdal herredsstyre 1959–1963
Party name (in Norwegian)	Number of representatives
Labour Party (Arbeiderpartiet)	15
Conservative Party (Høyre)	2
Communist Party (Kommunistiske Parti)	3
Centre Party (Senterpartiet)	3
Total number of members:	23

Stor-Elvdal herredsstyre 1955–1959
Party name (in Norwegian)	Number of representatives
Labour Party (Arbeiderpartiet)	14
Conservative Party (Høyre)	1
Communist Party (Kommunistiske Parti)	5
Farmers' Party (Bondepartiet)	3
Total number of members:	23

Stor-Elvdal herredsstyre 1951–1955
Party name (in Norwegian)	Number of representatives
Labour Party (Arbeiderpartiet)	12
Conservative Party (Høyre)	1
Communist Party (Kommunistiske Parti)	4
Farmers' Party (Bondepartiet)	3
Total number of members:	20

Stor-Elvdal herredsstyre 1947–1951
Party name (in Norwegian)	Number of representatives
Labour Party (Arbeiderpartiet)	11
Communist Party (Kommunistiske Parti)	6
Joint List(s) of Non-Socialist Parties (Borgerlige Felleslister)	3
Total number of members:	20

Stor-Elvdal herredsstyre 1945–1947
Party name (in Norwegian)	Number of representatives
Labour Party (Arbeiderpartiet)	12
Communist Party (Kommunistiske Parti)	6
Joint List(s) of Non-Socialist Parties (Borgerlige Felleslister)	2
Total number of members:	20

Stor-Elvdal herredsstyre 1937–1941*
Party name (in Norwegian)	Number of representatives
Labour Party (Arbeiderpartiet)	11
Communist Party (Kommunistiske Parti)	2
Farmers' Party (Bondepartiet)	1
Common List: Liberal Party and small farmholders (Samlingslista: Venstre og småbrukere)	2
Local List(s) (Lokale lister)	4
Total number of members:	20
Note: Due to the German occupation of Norway during World War II, no elections were held for new municipal councils until after the war ended in 1945.

Number of minorities (1st and 2nd generation) in Stor-Elvdal by country of origin in 2017
Ancestry	Number
Netherlands	28
Germany	28
Eritrea	26
Poland	23
Syria	18

=== Mayors ===
The mayor (Norwegian: ordfører) of Stor-Elvdal Municipality is the political leader of the municipality and the chairperson of the municipal council. Here is a list of people who have held this position:

- 1838–1839: Halvor Trønnes
- 1840–1841: Simen Øvergaard
- 1842–1843: Ole Stai
- 1844–1845: Ole Møkleby
- 1846–1847: Haagen Krogen
- 1848–1859: Jacob Dieseth
- 1860–1861: B. Trønnes
- 1862–1869: H. Atneosen
- 1870–1873: P. Trønnes
- 1874–1875: Tollef Trønnes
- 1876–1879: H. Atneosen
- 1880–1889: H.B. Trønnæs
- 1890–1891: Ole Olsen Evenstad
- 1892–1895: O. Øyen
- 1896–1901: Th. M. Ruud
- 1902–1904: Thore Myrvang (V)
- 1905–1912: Carl Johan Ecktell (LL)
- 1913–1916: Thore Myrvang (ArbDem)
- 1917–1919: Th. M. Ruud
- 1920–1922: Karl Bondesen
- 1922–1925: Thore Myrvang (ArbDem)
- 1925–1941: Knut Kristiansen (NKP)
- 1941–1941: Carl T. Lohrbauer (NS)
- 1941–1945: Ingvald Landet (NS)
- 1945–1945: Magne Myrvang (Ap)
- 1945–1951: Einar Heggelund
- 1952–1959: Magne Myrvang (Ap)
- 1959–1967: Bjarne Holen (Ap)
- 1967–1971: Lars Modahl (Ap)
- 1971–1979: Ivar Pedersen (Ap)
- 1979–1995: Ola Kristiansen (Ap)
- 1995–1999: Sigmund Vestad (LL)
- 1999–2003: Øyvind Strand (Ap)
- 2003–2011: Sigmund Vestad (LL)
- 2011–2015: Even Moen (Sp)
- 2015–2019: Terje Hoffstad (Ap)
- 2019–2023: Even Moen (Sp)
- 2023–present: Linda Otnes Henriksen (Ap)

== Geography ==
Stor-Elvdal is bordered on the north by Folldal Municipality and Alvdal Municipality, on the east by Rendalen Municipality, in the south by Åmot Municipality and Ringsaker Municipality, in the west by Øyer Municipality and Ringebu Municipality, and in the northwest by Sør-Fron Municipality.

The lake Atnsjøen is located in the northwestern part of the municipality, just outside Rondane National Park. The river Glomma runs through the municipality. The highest point in the municipality is the 1,766.74-metre (5,796.4 ft) tall mountain Gravskardhøgda in the far northern edge of the municipality.

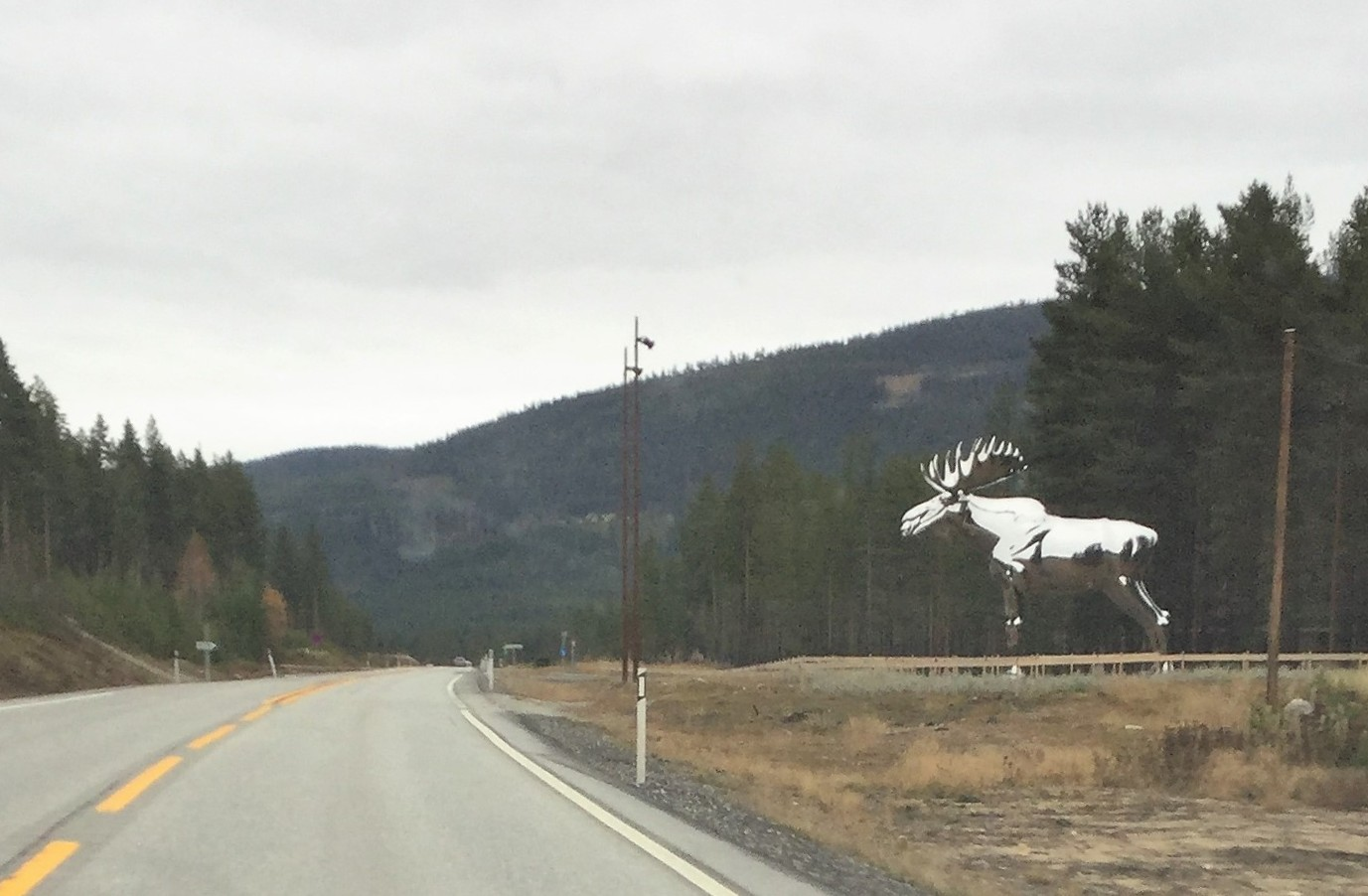
Storelgen ('The giant moose') in Stor-Elvdal

== Tourism ==
Stor-Elvdal Municipality boasts the second tallest moose statue in the world. The Big Elk is a steel giant moose at the side of the Norwegian National Road 3.

== Notable people ==
- Thore Embretsen Myrvang (1858–1939), an educator, politician, and three-time mayor of Stor-Elvdal
- Halldis Neegaard Østbye (1896 in Stor-Elvdal – 1983), a person known as "Norway's most fanatical Naziwoman" during WWII
- Torkel Andreas Trønnes (1925-2011), an automobile advocate who lived in Koppang

== Sister cities ==
Stor-Elvdal Municipality has sister city agreements with the following places:

- Sõmeru Parish, Lääne-Viru County, Estonia
