= Norwegian Motor Trade Association =

Headquartered in Majorstua borough, Oslo, the Norwegian Motor Trade Association (Norwegian: Norges Bilbransjeforbund, NBF) is a Norwegian employers' organisation, organized under the national Confederation of Norwegian Enterprise.

It traces its roots back to 1928.

The current CEO is Stig Morten Nilsen. Chairman of the board is Birger Skjellvik.
