= Sollia Church =

Church in Innlandet, Norway

- Sollia kirke
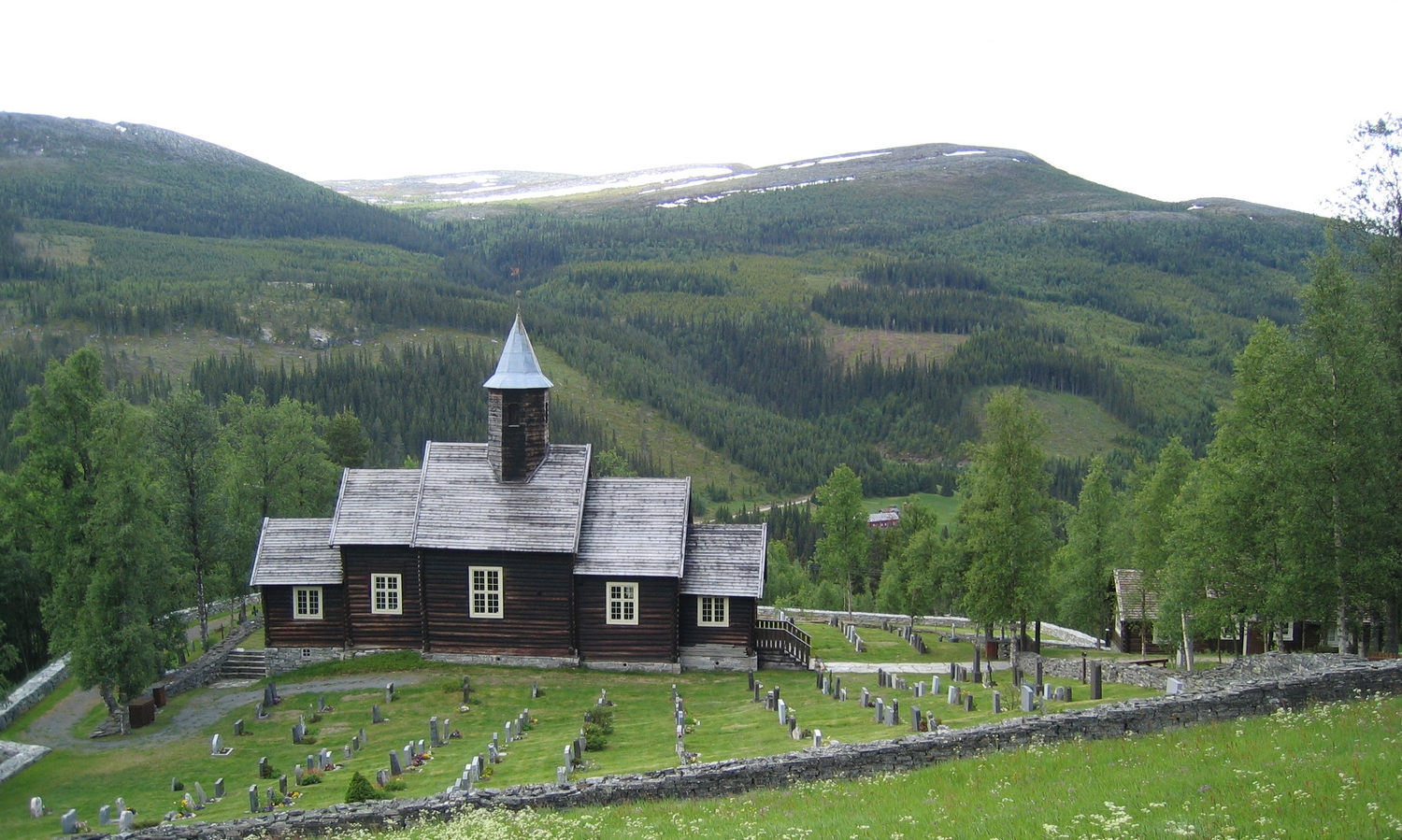
- View of the church
- Sollia Church
- 61°46′49″N 10°24′03″E
- Location: Stor-Elvdal Municipality, Innlandet
- Country: Norway
- Denomination: Church of Norway
- Churchmanship: Evangelical Lutheran

History
- Status: Parish church
- Founded: 1738
- Consecrated: 7 September 1738

Architecture
- Functional status: Active
- Architect: Jon Jonsen
- Architectural type: Long church
- Completed: 1738 (288 years ago)

Specifications
- Capacity: 85
- Materials: Wood

Administration
- Diocese: Hamar bispedømme
- Deanery: Sør-Østerdal prosti
- Parish: Sollia
- Norwegian Cultural Heritage Site
- Type: Church
- Status: Automatically protected
- ID: 85516

Sollia Church (Norwegian: Sollia kirke) is a parish church of the Church of Norway in Stor-Elvdal Municipality in Innlandet county, Norway. It is located in the village of Sollia. It is the church for the Sollia parish which is part of the Sør-Østerdal prosti (deanery) in the Diocese of Hamar. The brown, wooden church was built in a long church design in 1738 using plans drawn up by the architect Jon Jonsen. The church seats about 85 people.

== History ==
The area around Sollia Church in the Atnedalen valley was settled at the end of the 17th century, initially by four families. Prior to that time, the area had been uninhabited. The road to the nearest church over the mountain (Ringebu Church) was problematic, not least in the winter. After a winter when several people died on the way to the church, it was decided to build a new church at Sollia (or Setningsdalen, as it was originally called). It was built by Jon Jonsen without drawings and with building materials provided by the villagers. The church was consecrated on 7 September 1738. Throughout the 18th century, the population in the area increased. In 1770, another second floor seating gallery was built along the north wall, and in 1840 the church nave was extended to the west to accommodate more seating. Later, a sacristy was built on the east end of the building. In 1864, the windows were replaced with new, larger windows.

== Media gallery ==
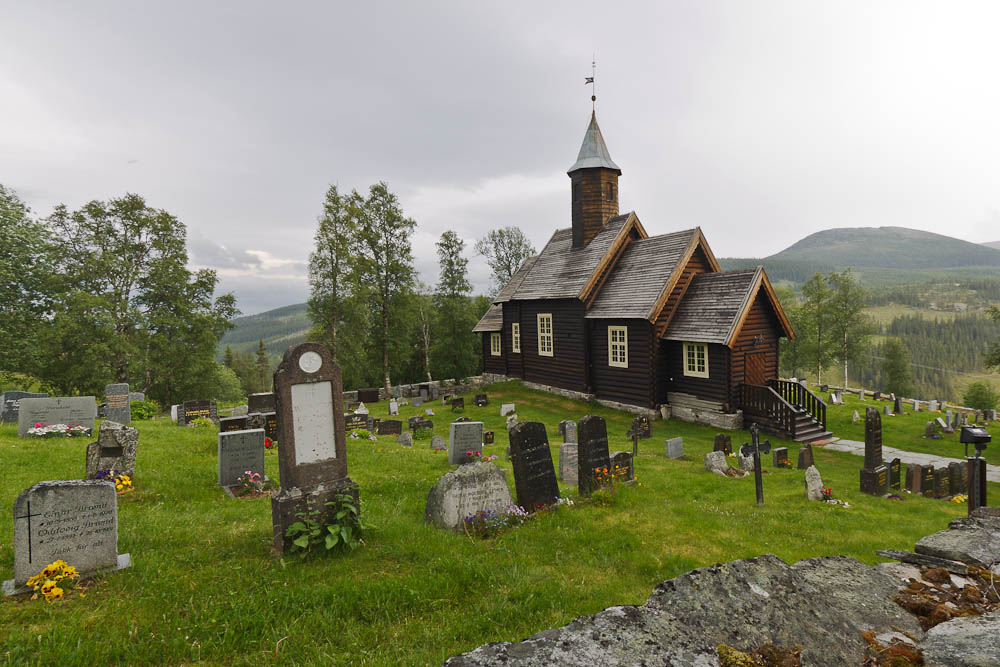

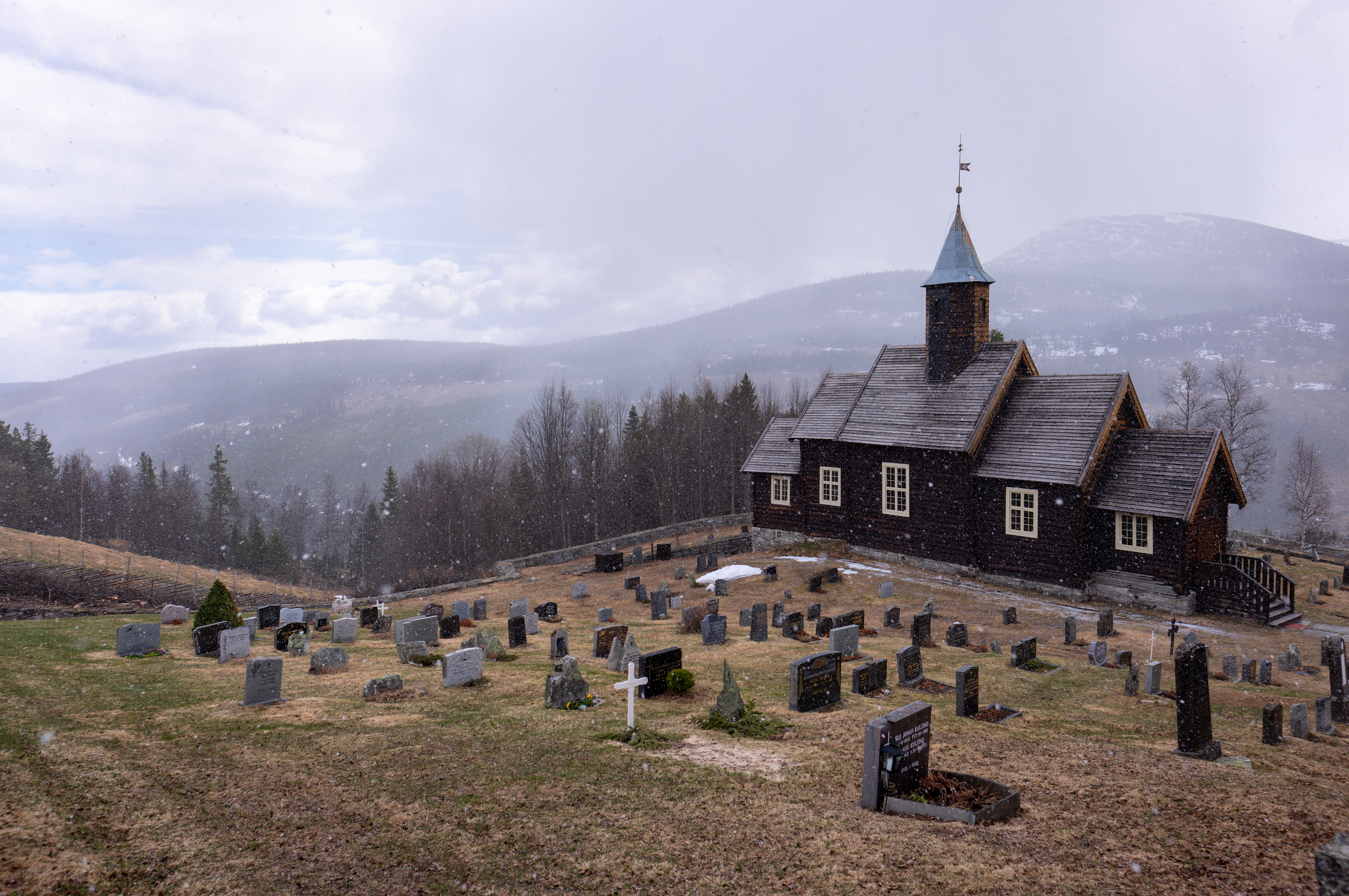

== See also ==
- List of churches in Hamar
