= Stor-Elvdal Church =

Church in Innlandet, Norway

- Stor-Elvdal kirke
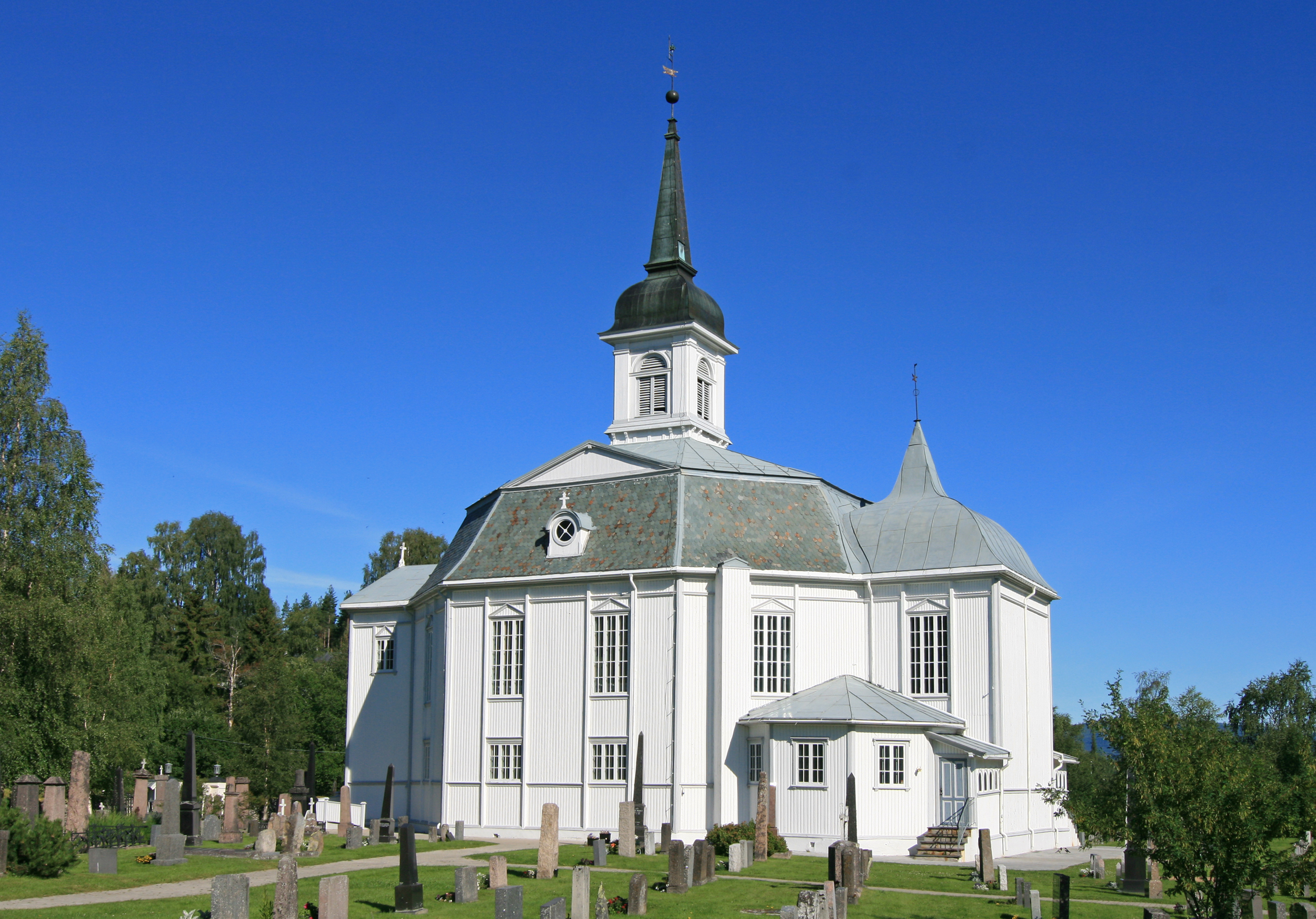
- View of the church
- Stor-Elvdal Church
- 61°31′27″N 11°02′54″E
- Location: Stor-Elvdal, Innlandet
- Country: Norway
- Denomination: Church of Norway
- Previous denomination: Catholic Church
- Churchmanship: Evangelical Lutheran

History
- Status: Parish church
- Founded: 12th century
- Consecrated: 12 September 1821

Architecture
- Functional status: Active
- Architect: Sven Aspaas
- Architectural type: Octagonal
- Completed: 1821 (205 years ago)

Specifications
- Capacity: 450
- Materials: Wood

Administration
- Diocese: Hamar bispedømme
- Deanery: Sør-Østerdal prosti
- Parish: Stor-Elvdal
- Norwegian Cultural Heritage Site
- Type: Church
- Status: Automatically protected
- ID: 85581

Stor-Elvdal Church (Norwegian: Stor-Elvdal kirke) is a parish church of the Church of Norway in Stor-Elvdal Municipality in Innlandet county, Norway. It is located in the village of Negardshaugen. It is one of the churches for the Stor-Elvdal parish which is part of the Sør-Østerdal prosti (deanery) in the Diocese of Hamar. The white, wooden church was built in a octagonal design in 1821 using plans drawn up by the architect Sven Aspaas. The church seats about 450 people.

== History ==
The earliest existing historical records of the church date back to the year 1318, but that was not the year the church was first built. The first church in Stor-Elvdal was likely a wooden stave church that was likely built during the 12th century. The church built on the Koppangsjordet island in the river Glomma, just south of today's town of Koppang, and at that time it was known as the Koppangkirken. Historically, this site was on the mainland, but over time, the river course has changed, creating a large island between two branches of the river. Archaeological evidence shows that the church measured approximately 10.7 by 5.4 metres (35 ft × 18 ft). Sometime during the 15th century, the river flooded and the church was significantly damaged. Legend says that some of the timbers ended up on the mainland about 1 kilometre (0.62 mi) to the south on a plot of land that was later known as Kirkemoen. Parishioners took this as a sign and after the flood, the old church was torn down and a new church was built on the site were the timbers ended up.

This new church was dedicated to the archangel Michael, so it was known as St. Michael's Church. This church was also a wooden stave church that was about the same size as the previous building, 10.7 by 5.4 metres (35 ft × 18 ft). This church had a tarred exterior and no tower. Some of the salvageable materials from the old church were reused in the construction of this building. In 1625, the nave was extended about 3–4 metres (9.8–13.1 ft) to the west to give more room for seating. In 1638–1640, the church was renovated which included replacing the roof and a new pulpit. In 1730, the church was enlarged again, this time by adding transepts to the north and south to create a cruciform floor plan. A sacristy was also built on the end of the eastern wing of the building and a tower on the roof. By the late-18th century, the church was in poor condition and was in need of replacement or significant repairs. After much debate and discussion, it was decided to build a new church on a new site about 1.4 kilometres (0.87 mi) further south along the river.

The new church was designed by Sven Aspaas and it had an octagonal design. Construction began in 1807, and in 1809 the walls were completed and the roof and tower were put in place as well as the spire from the old church. Then, construction stopped due to the Napoleonic Wars, distress, and famine. The Napoleonic Wars were a series of wars in the early 1800s that contributed to the end of the Kingdom of Denmark-Norway. Also, the architect, Sven Aspaas, died in 1815. It wasn't until 1819 that the construction work began again, led by Ole Evenstad. The church was consecrated on 12 September 1821 even though it was not entirely finished at that time. After the consecration, the work continued until around 1830 with the installation of wood stoves, the tarring of the roof, the painting of the towers and exterior siding, and painting the interior painting.

Around 1890, a major renovation was carried out using plans by the architect Herman Backer. A new choir was built on the east end of the octagonal building. Two sacristies were built on either side of it as well. A church porch was built on the west end of the building too. Also during this renovation, the roof and tower were removed and the walls were built 60 centimetres (24 in) taller before rebuilding the roof and tower. New exterior siding was installed along with new interior benches and interior painting. The church is said to no longer have anything left from the church Sven Aspaas built except for the octagonal skeleton of timber. The remodeled building was re-consecrated on 18 March 1891 by Bishop Arnoldus Hille.

== Media gallery ==
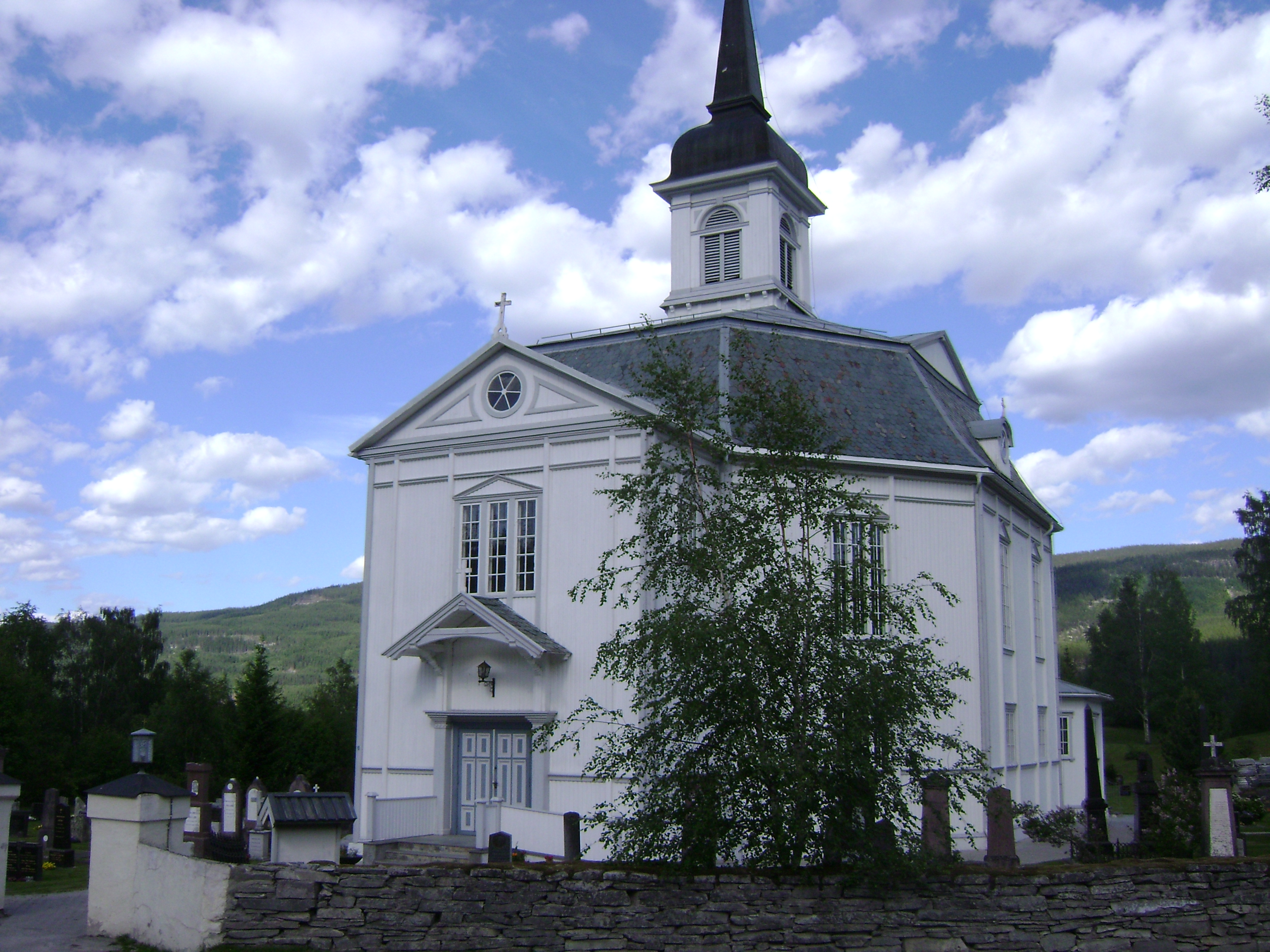

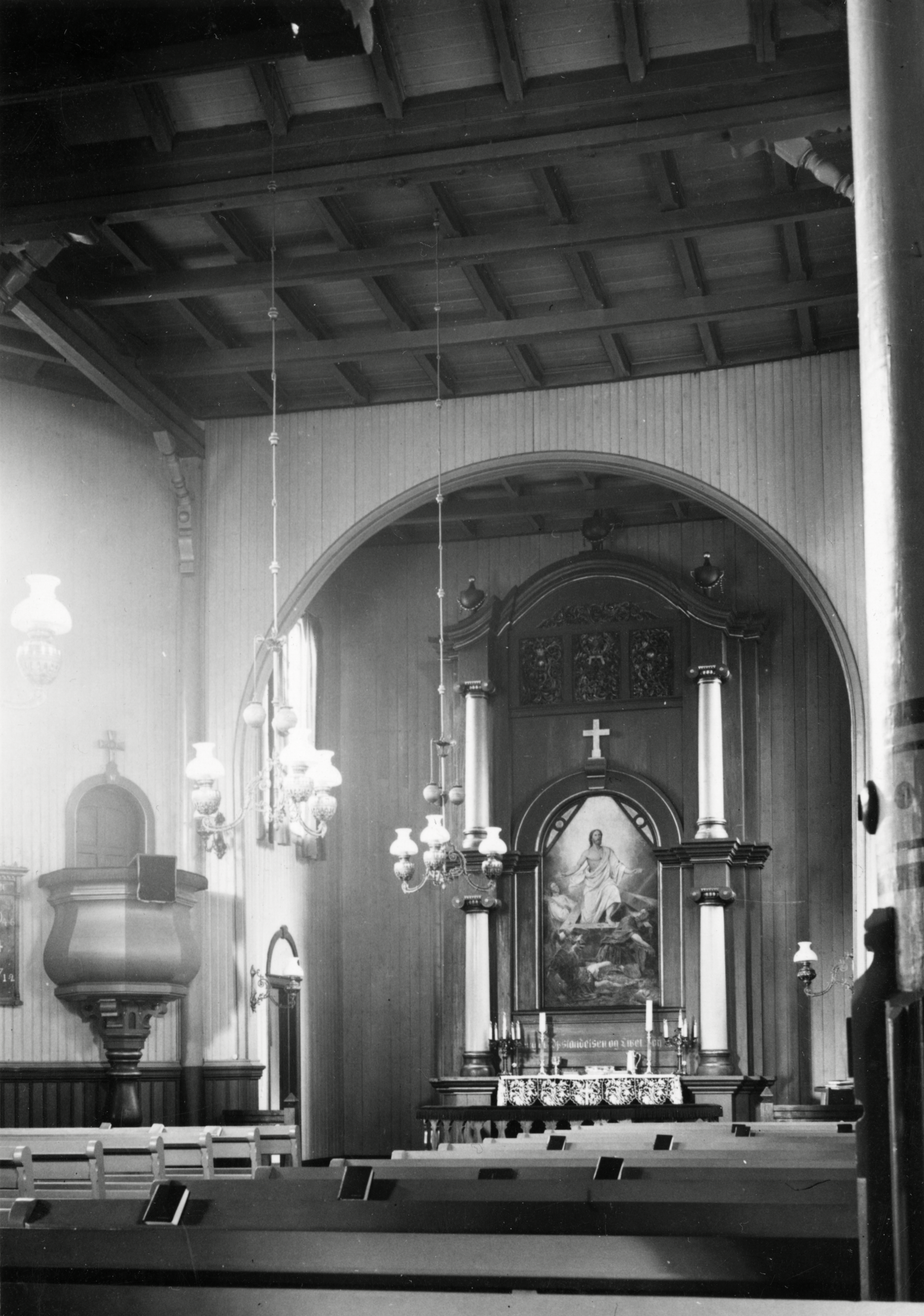

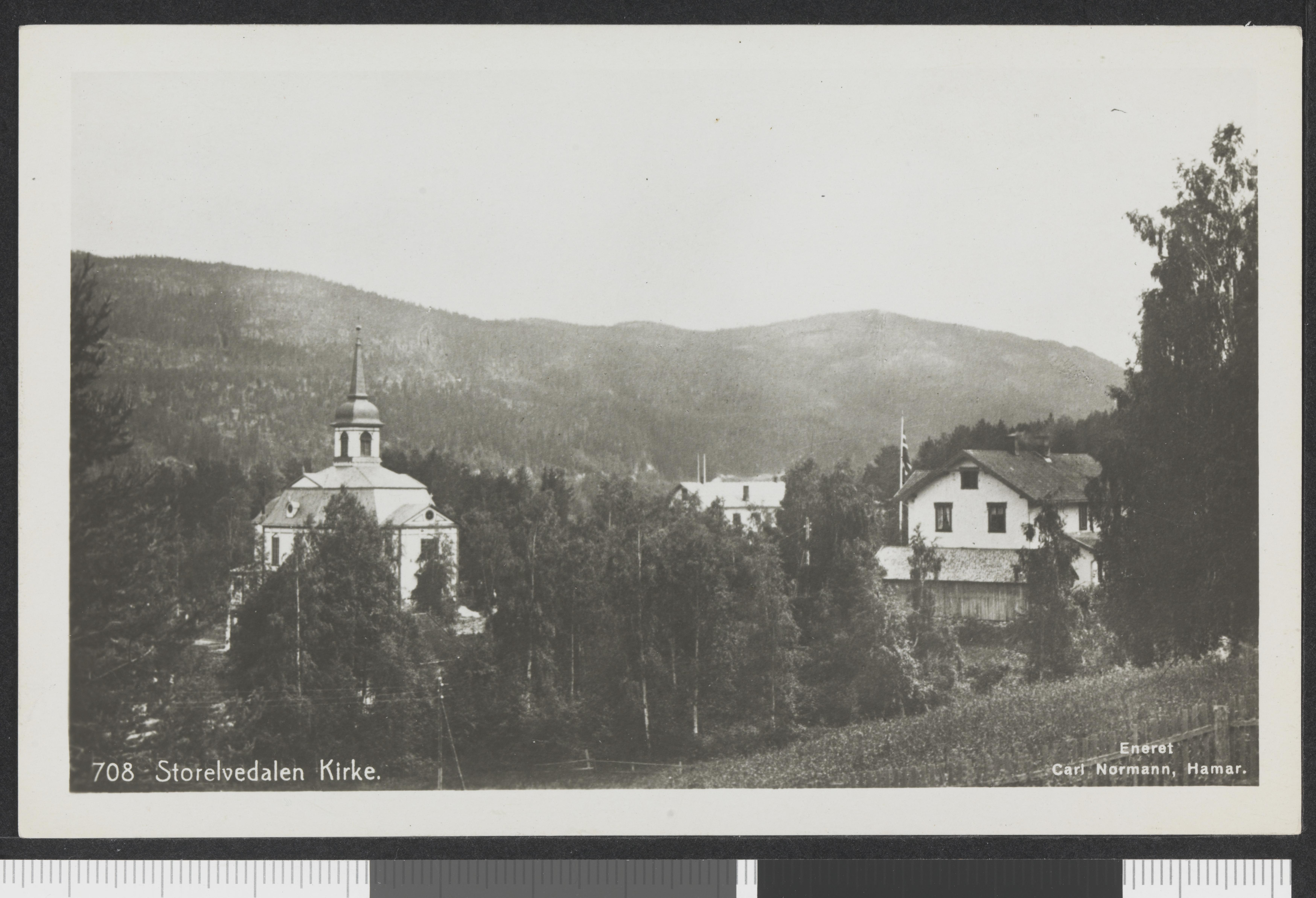

== See also ==
- List of churches in Hamar
