= Koppang =

Village in Innlandet, Norway

- Village
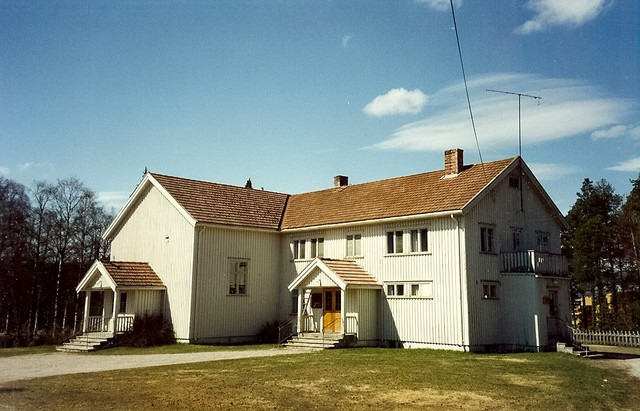
- View of the Koppang Church
- Interactive map of Koppang
- Coordinates: 61.57219°N 11.04659°E
- Country: Norway
- Region: Eastern Norway
- County: Innlandet
- District: Østerdalen
- Municipality: Stor-Elvdal Municipality

Area
  - Total: 2.02 km^{2} (0.78 sq mi)
- Elevation: 352 m (1,155 ft)

Population (2024)
  - Total: 1,006
  - Density: 498/km^{2} (1,290/sq mi)
- Time zone: UTC+01:00 (CET)
  - Summer (DST): UTC+02:00 (CEST)
- Post Code: 2480 Koppang

Koppang is the administrative centre of Stor-Elvdal Municipality in Innlandet county, Norway. The village is located along the river Glomma in the Østerdalen valley. The Rørosbanen railway and the Norwegian National Road 3 both run through the village. The railway stops at Koppang Station. The village has several schools, shops, and a cultural center as well as a movie theater, library, bookstore, bank, and Koppang Church. The newspaper Østerdølen has been published in Koppang since 1999.

The settlement has a large modern sawmill that employs many residents. There are many opportunities for fitness trips in the area whether by skiing, riding or on foot. The 2.02-square-kilometre (500-acre) village has a population (2024) of 1,006 and a population density of 498 inhabitants per square kilometre (1,290/sq mi).

== History ==
From ancient times, people lived in the valley, but repeated flooding caused them to move higher up along its sides. Barns remain at Koppanjordet which have survived many floods. The Old King's Road (Norwegian: Gamle Kongevei) which went from Oslo to Trondheim runs through Koppang. It was used not only by the king and his entourage but also by pilgrims on their way to the Nidaros Cathedral in Trondheim.

The name comes from the medieval word kaupang which refers to the site of a market place which had been held here since the Middle Ages. From early on, the settlement had an old stave church (Stor-Elvdal Church) at Koppanjordet, traces of which still remain. According to legend, the church was destroyed by a flood and the logs washed ashore in the shape of a cross at Kirkemoen. A new stave church was built on the site, dedicated to Saint Michael.

The Røros Line reached Koppang in 1875, the village being served by Koppang Station. From 1877 to 1885, the trains on the line had an overnight stop at Koppang, leading to increased commerce and an expansion of the settlement.
