= 1954 in Norway =

- Centuries: 18th; 19th; 20th; 21st
- Decades: 1930s; 1940s; 1950s; 1960s; 1970s
- See also: List of years in Norway

Events in the year 1954 in Norway.

== Incumbents ==
- Monarch – Haakon VII.
- Prime Minister – Oscar Torp (Labour Party)

== Events ==
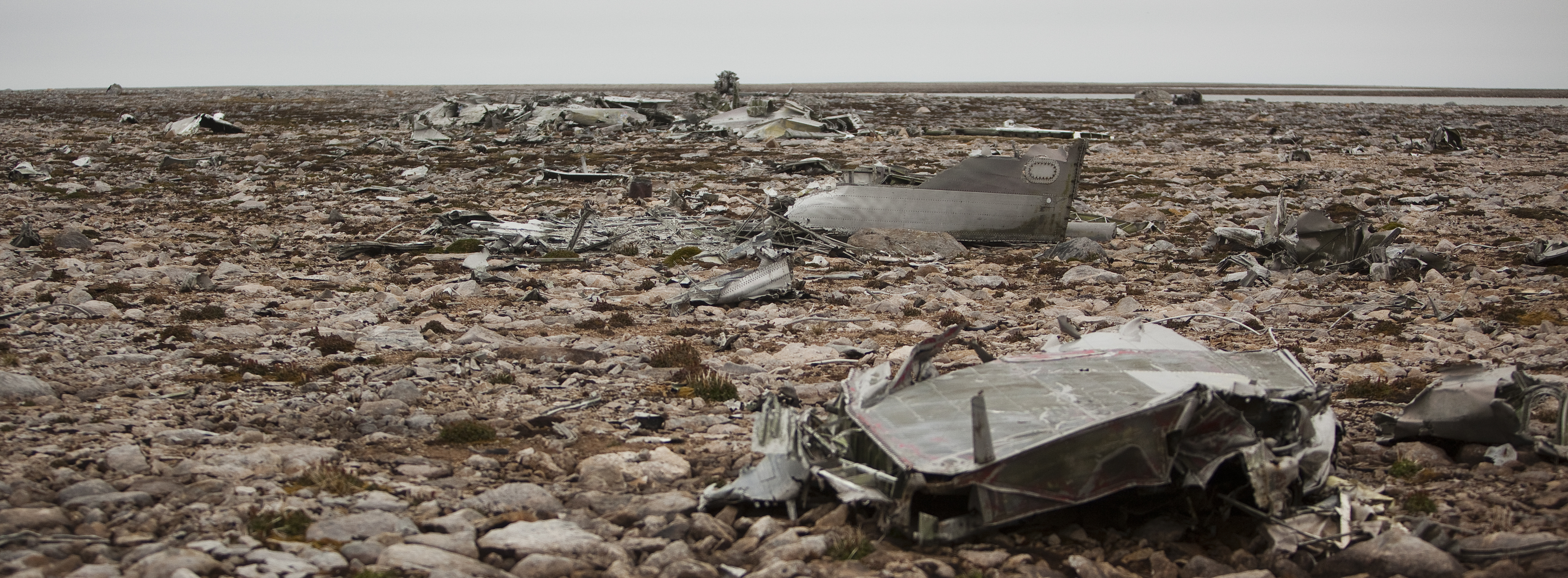
Bear Island accident. Photo by Per Harald Olsen

- 28 March – Bear Island accident: A Royal Norwegian Air Force seaplane crashed on the Bear Island. The plane had a crew of 8 men and one passenger. One of the crew members survived the accident.
- 5 April – Crown Princess Martha, wife of Crown Prince Olav dies, age 53.
- 3 May – Asbjørn Sunde and Erling Nordby were convicted for treason and espionage in favour of the Soviet Union.
- State-owned Årdal og Sunndal Verk begins construction on a plant in Sunndal Municipality.

== Anniversaries ==
- 100 years since the opening of Norway's first railway line.

=== Sports ===
- Martin Stokken, cross country skier and athlete, is awarded the Holmenkollen medal, Norway's highest skiing award.
- Football Association of Norway joins UEFA.

== Notable births ==
=== January–March ===
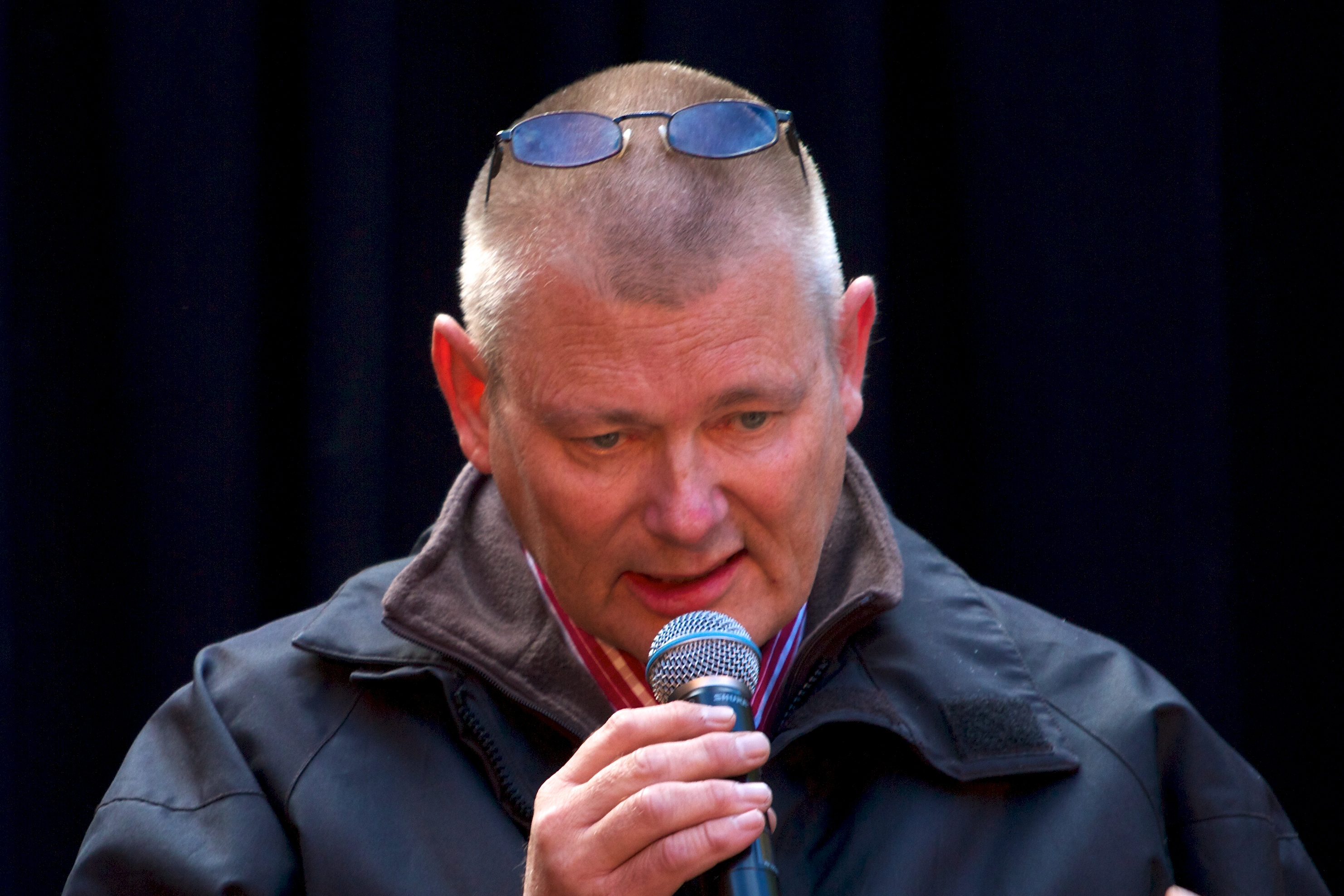
Thorvald Steen

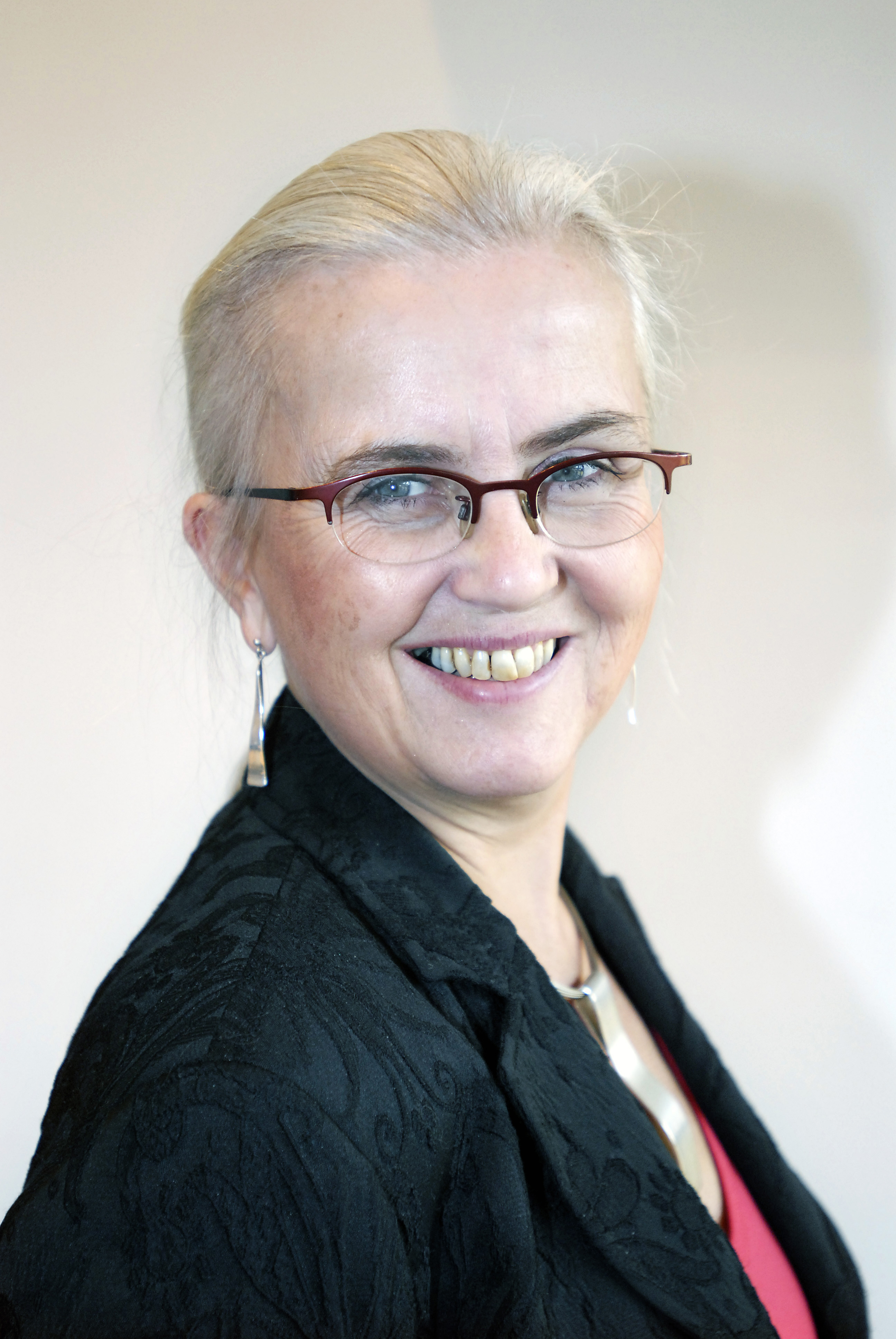
Helen Bjørnøy

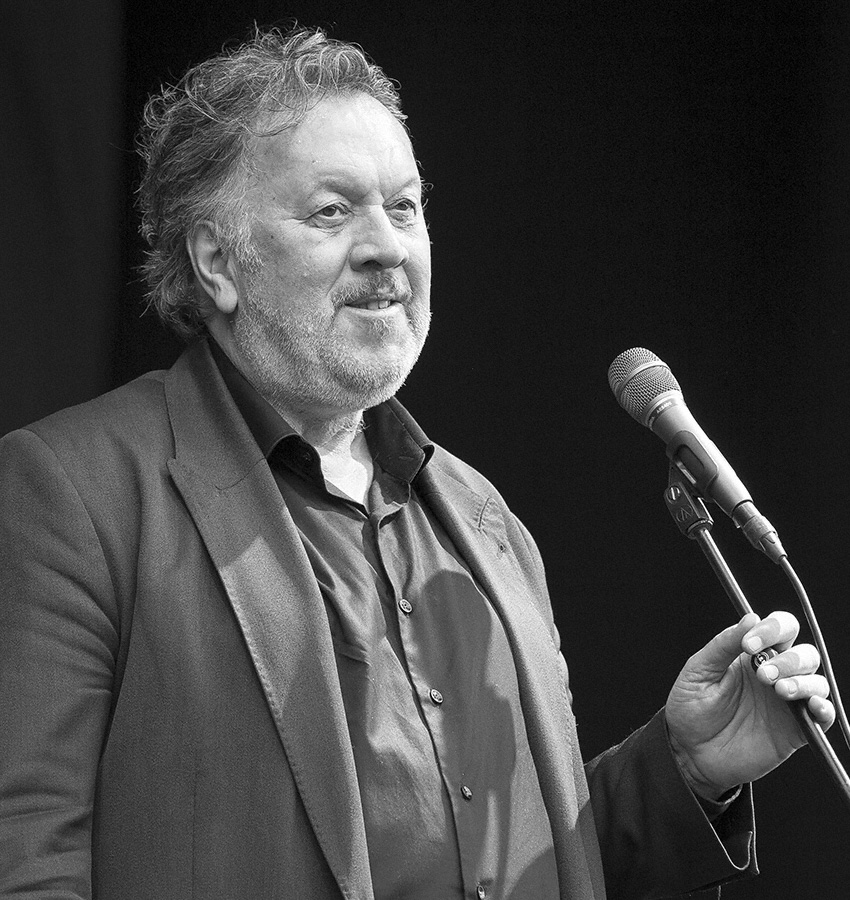
Bjørn Eidsvåg

- 9 January – Thorvald Steen, writer and government scholar
- 12 January – Jan-Olav Ingvaldsen, politician (d. 2021).
- 14 January – Gunnar Andreas Berg, guitarist.
- 22 January – Rita Tveiten, politician.
- 23 January – Rune J. Skjælaaen, politician.
- 27 January – Leif Holger Larsen, diplomat (died 2015).
- 29 January – Christian Bjelland IV, investor.
- 29 January – Vera Lysklætt, politician.
- 30 January – Thomas Ebbesen, Franco-Norwegian physical chemist and professor at the University of Strasbourg in France
- 8 February – Per Thomas Andersen, literary historian and novelist (died 2023).
- 9 February – Michael Tetzschner, politician.
- 14 February – Per Christian Ellefsen, actor.
- 16 February – Viggo Hagstrøm, legal scholar (died 2013).
- 16 February – Kjartan Hatløy, poet.
- 16 February – Torbjørn Sunde, jazz trombonist.
- 18 February – Helen Bjørnøy, Lutheran minister and politician.
- 28 February – Jan Fjærestad, orienteering competitor and athlete.
- 3 March – Christian Ringnes, businessman.
- 6 March – Bjørg Tysdal Moe, politician.
- 9 March – Harald Sunde, army general.
- 15 March – Unni Steinsmo, chemical engineer.
- 17 March – Bjørn Eidsvåg, singer, songwriter and Lutheran minister
- 25 March – Grete Berget, politician and Minister (died 2017).
- 27 March – Helge Iberg, composer.

=== April–June ===
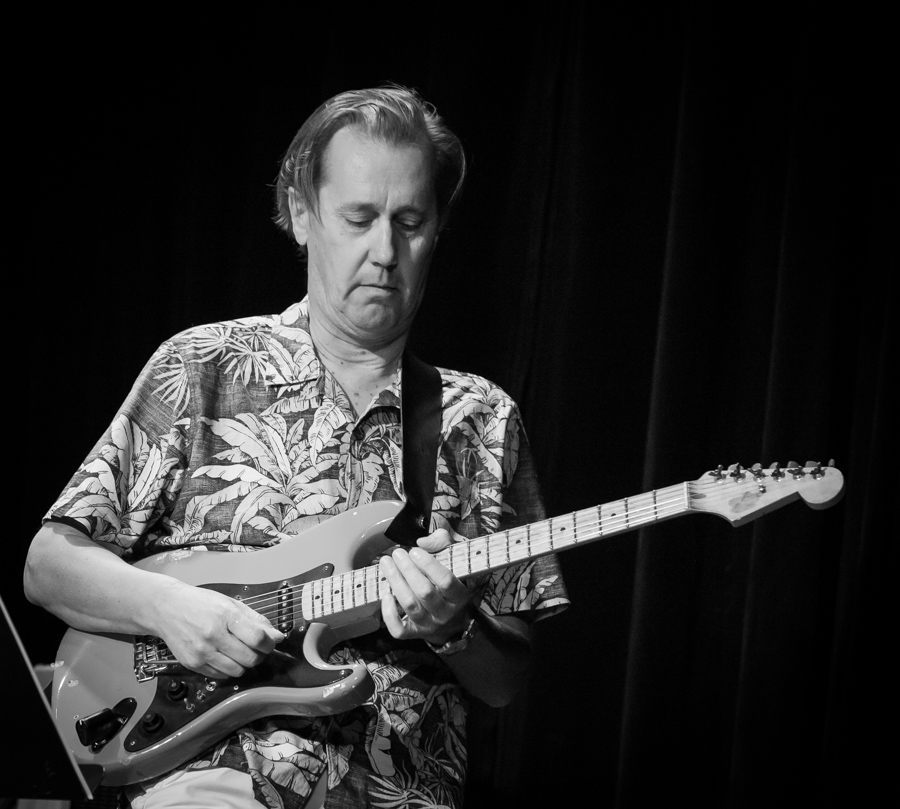
Knut Værnes

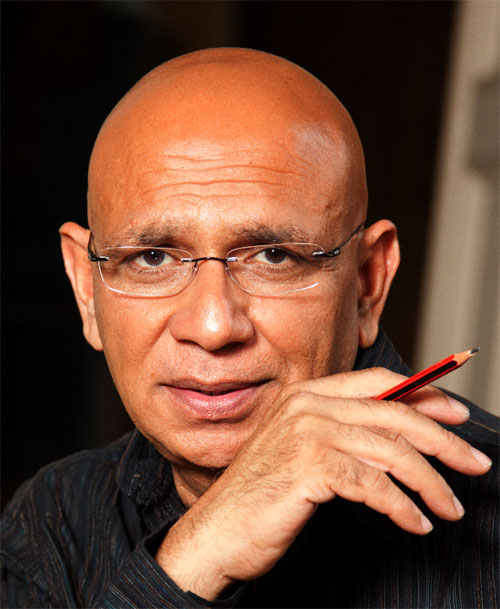
Khalid Salimi

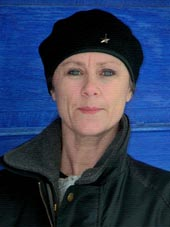
Liv Mildrid Gjernes

- 1 April – Knut Værnes, jazz musician.
- 2 April – Olav Christopher Jenssen, visual artist.
- 3 April – Mille-Marie Treschow, landlord and businessperson (died 2018).
- 7 April – Magne Lerø, publisher and editor.
- 7 April – Geir Myhre, ice hockey player (died 2016).
- 15 April – Roar Hagen, illustrator.
- 15 April – Stefan Kutzsche, physician.
- 16 April – Ingun Brechan, sport rower.
- 20 April – Ove Wisløff, swimmer.
- 22 April – Håkon Berge, composer.
- 23 April – Rune Hauge, football agent.
- 26 April – Toril Førland, alpine skier.
- 27 April – Geir Toskedal, politician.
- 28 April – Gunn Berit Gjerde, politician
- 28 April – Frank Jakobsen, jazz musician.
- 2 May – Kristen Gislefoss, meteorologist.
- 3 May – Ivonne Caprino, film director and model
- 6 May – Knut Magnus Olsen, politician.
- 23 May – Khalid Salimi, journalist and organizational leader.
- 29 May – Jon Øyvind Odland, politician.
- 31 May – Arne Larsen Økland, retired footballer
- 1 June – Hanne Heuch, ceramist
- 2 June – Liv Mildrid Gjernes, artist.
- 13 June – Cecilie Landsverk, diplomat.
- 19 June – Jon Jæger Gåsvatn, politician.
- 26 June – Rigmor Andersen Eide, politician.

=== July–September ===
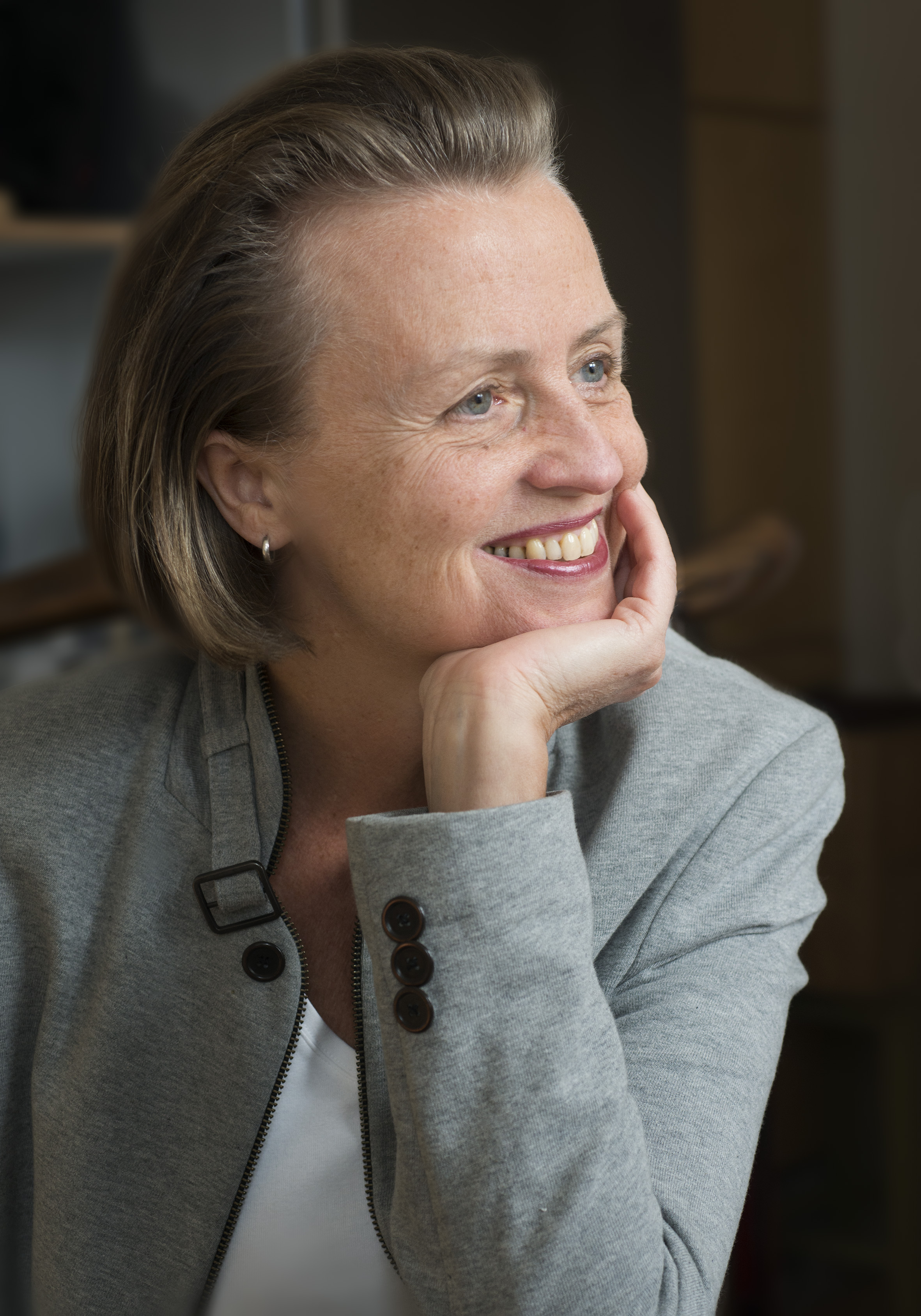
Cecilie Ore

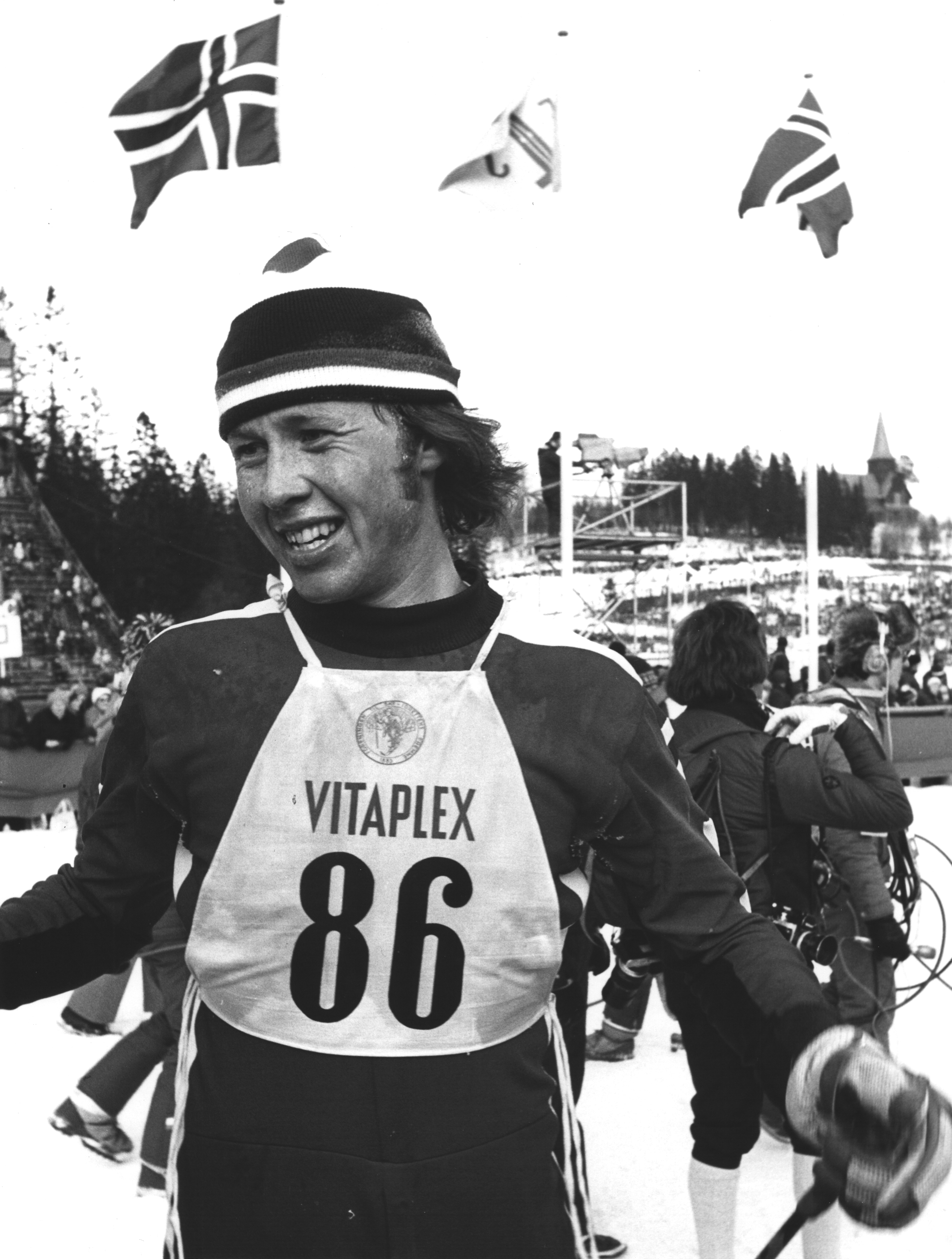
Per Knut Aaland

- 10 July – Wenche Andersen, chef
- 11 July – Berit Reiss-Andersen, lawyer.
- 15 July – Ole-Anton Teigen, politician.
- 19 July – Cecilie Ore, composer.
- 21 July – Otto Jespersen, comedian.
- 26 July – Kjell Einar Midthun, illustrator and cartoonist
- 3 August – Chris Tvedt, crime fiction writer.
- 16 August – Egil Svartdahl, pentecontalist.
- 18 August – Egil Johansen, orienteering competitor.
- 18 August – Jostein Stige, sprint canoer.
- 28 August – Torgeir Schjerven, author and poet
- 5 September – Per Knut Aaland, cross country skier
- 17 September – Helge Bjørnsen, politician.
- 20 September – Arne Blix, journalist
- 20 September – Geir Adelsten Iversen, politician.
- 23 September – Idar Lind, novelist, crime fiction writer, songwriter and playwright.
- 28 September – Åge Konradsen, politician.

=== October–December ===
Terje Moe Gustavsen

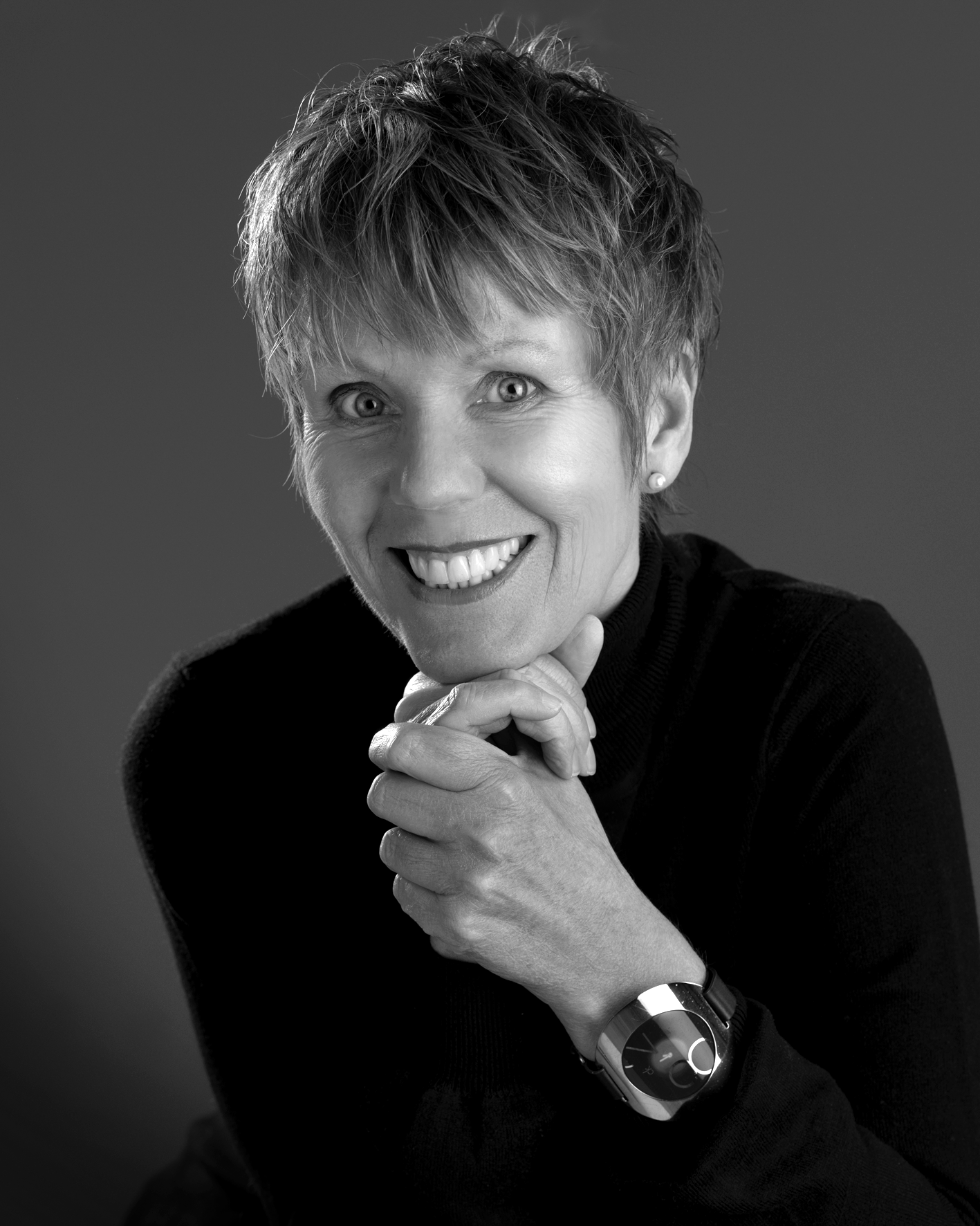
Karin Fossum

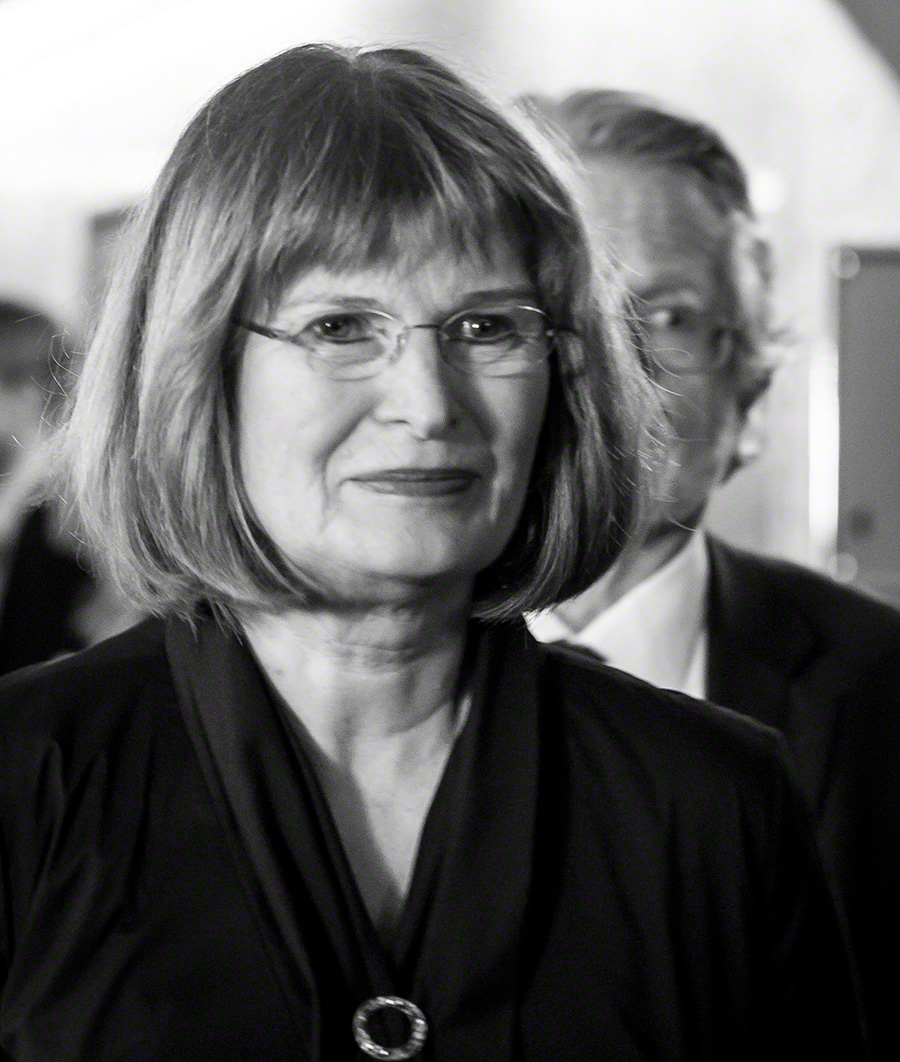
Anne Carine Tanum

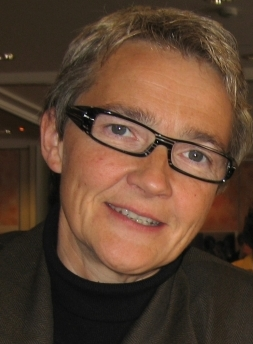
Kine Hellebust

- 1 October – Tone Pahle, sport rower.
- 5 October – Frank Krog, actor (died 2008).
- 7 October – Kjell Grandhagen, military officer (died 2019).
- 7 October – Olav Ulleren, politician.
- 17 October
  - Hans Kristian Hogsnes, politician (d. 2010).
  - Øystein Sørensen, historian
- 20 October – Terje Moe Gustavsen, politician (died 2019).
- 6 November – Karin Fossum, author
- 15 November – Arne A. Jensen, media and corporate executive (died 2020).
- 21 November – Jon Fredrik Baksaas, business executive.
- 25 November – Kristin Moe, politician
- 27 November – Elisabeth Berge, businessperson and civil servant (died 2020).
- 27 November – Anne Carine Tanum, business executive.
- 15 December – Kine Hellebust, singer, actress, children's writer, non-fiction writer and playwright.
- 18 December – Kåre Nordstoga, organist.
- 20 December – Trond Halstein Moe, operatic baritone.
- 21 December – Grethe Fossli, politician
- 26 December – Roy Jacobsen, writer (d. 2025)
- 30 December – Solveig Torsvik, politician.

=== Full date unknown ===
- Jan Bugge-Mahrt, diplomat
- Bente Haukland Næss, politician
- Harald Thon, orienteering competitor (died 2019).

== Notable deaths ==
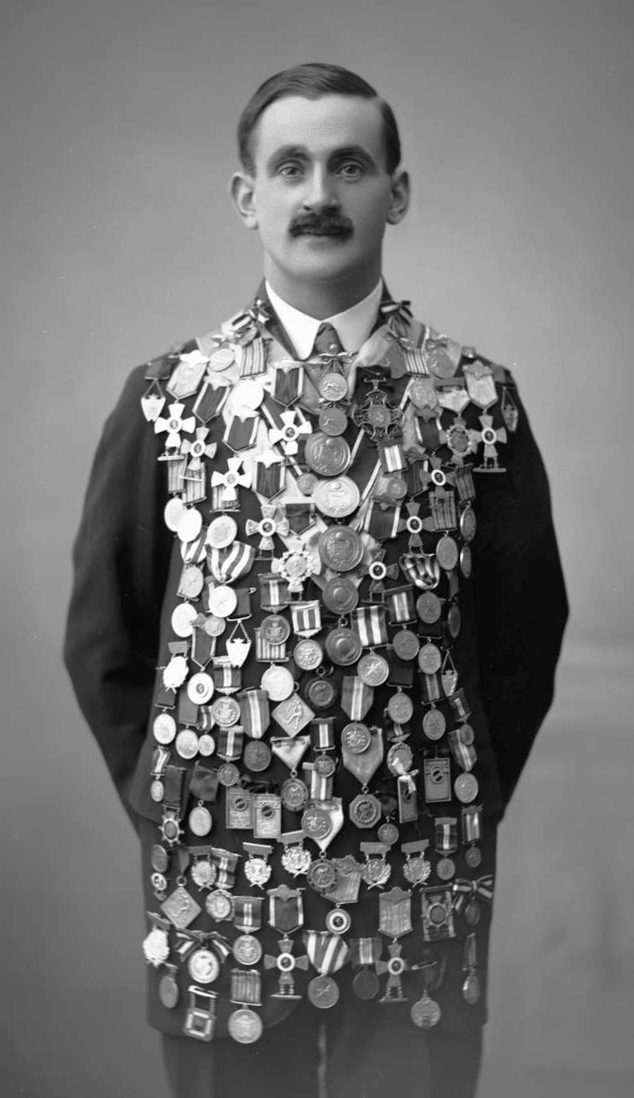
Oscar Mathisen

- 21 January – Per Reidarson, composer and music critic (born 1879)
- 31 January – Christian Fredrik Monsen, politician (born 1878)
- 8 March – Leiv Heggstad, educator, linguist and translator (born 1879).
- 5 April – Crown Princess Martha, royal (born 1901)
- 10 April – Oscar Mathisen, speed skater (born 1888)
- 28 April – Knud Leonard Knudsen, gymnast and Olympic gold-medallist (born 1879)
- 25 May – Snefrid Eriksmoen, politician (born 1894)
- 25 May – Albert Helgerud, rifle shooter and Olympic gold medallist (born 1876).
- 4 June – Wilhelm Keilhau, historian and economist (born 1888).
- 7 June – Sigurd Smebye, gymnast and Olympic bronze medallist (born 1886)
- 4 July – Wilhelm Blystad, track and field athlete (born 1881)
- 27 July – Jacob Tullin Thams, Olympian skier (born 1889)
- 29 July – Knut Johannes Hougen, politician and Minister (born 1854)
- 14 August – Fredrik Ludvig Konow, politician and Minister (born 1864)

=== Full date unknown ===
- Rasmus Olsen Langeland, politician and Minister (born 1873)
- Per Berg Lund, politician and Minister (born 1878)
- Torjus Værland, politician and Minister (born 1868)
