= Cecilie =

Cecilie is a given name. Notable people with the name include:

- Princess Cecilie of Baden (1839–1891), Grand Duchess of Russia
- Cecilie Beck, Scandinavian musician and audiovisual artist
- Cecilie Østensen Berglund (born 1971), Norwegian judge
- Cecilie Brandt (born 2001), Danish handball player
- Cecilie Dahl (1960), Norwegian artist
- Cecilie Dahl (born 1858), Norwegian painter and author
- Cecilie Enger (born 1963), Norwegian journalist, novelist and children's writer
- Cecilie Finne-Ipsen (born 1998), Danish professional golfer and badminton player
- Cecilie Fiskerstrand (born 1996), Norwegian footballer
- Cecilie Fløe (born 2001), Danish footballer
- Cecilie French (1915–1962), British chemist
- Princess Cecilie of Greece and Denmark (1911–1937), Hereditary Grand Duchess of Hesse and by Rhine
- Cecilie Greve (born 1992), Danish handball player
- Cecilie Liv Hansen (born 2001), Danish politician
- Cecilie Mørch Hansen (born 1993), Danish handball player
- Cecilie Winther Johansen (born 2000), Danish footballer
- Cecilie Gotaas Johnsen (born 1976, Norwegian cyclist
- Cecilie Jørgensen (1814–1890), Norwegian actress and opera singer
- Cecilie Maja Hastrup Karshøj (born 1987), Danish musician, known professionally as Coco O.
- Cecilie Klysner (born 1994), Danish orienteering competitor
- Cecilie Broch Knudsen (born 1950), Norwegian artist
- Cecilie Breil Kramer (born 1987), Danish footballer
- Cecilie Kristiansen (born 1990), Danish Paralympic swimmer
- Cecilie Thoresen Krog (1858–1911), Norwegian women's rights pioneer
- Cecilie Redisch Kvamme (born 1995), Norwegian footballer
- Cecilie Landsverk (born 1954), Norwegian diplomat
- Cecilie Leganger (born 1975), Norwegian handball player
- Cecilie Løvdal (born 1998), Norwegian handball player
- Cecilie Løveid (born 1951), Norwegian writer
- Cecilie Uttrup Ludwig (born 1995), Danish cyclist
- Cecilie Lundgreen (born 1973), Norwegian professional golfer
- Cecilie Manz (born 1972), Danish industrial designer
- Cecilie Mauritzen (born 1961), Norwegian oceanographer
- Duchess Cecilie of Mecklenburg-Schwerin (1886–1954), German and Prussian Crown Princess
- Cecilie Mosli (born 1973), Norwegian actress and film director
- Cecilie Myrseth (born 1984), Norwegian politician
- Cecilie Drabsch Norland (born 1978), Norwegian Paralympic swimmer
- Cecilie Ore (born 1954), Norwegian composer
- Cecilie Cottis Østreng (born 1967), Norwegian writer
- Cecilie Paus (born 1943), Norwegian businesswoman
- Cecilie Pedersen (Danish footballer) (born 1983), Danish footballer
- Cecilie Pedersen (Norwegian footballer) (born 1990), Norwegian footballer
- Wilhelm, German Crown Prince (1882–1951), Last German crown prince
- Cecilie Risøe (born 1952), Norwegian physician
- Cecilie Sandvej (born 1990), Danish footballer
- Cecilie Christine Schøller (1720–1786), Norwegian land owner and socialite
- Cecilie Skog (born 1974), Norwegian adventurer
- Cecilie Stenspil (born 1979), Danish actress
- Sille Struck (born 1998), Danish footballer
- Cecilie Tenfjord-Toftby (born 1970), Swedish politician
- Cecilie Thomsen (born 1974), Danish actress and model
- Cecilie Thorsmark, Danish CEO of Copenhagen Fashion Week
- Cecilie Thorsteinsen (born 1974), Norwegian handball player
- Cecilie Torhaug (born 1969), Norwegian curler
- Cecília Wohl (1862–1939), Lithuanian-Hungarian salonist
- Cecilie Woller (born 1992), Danish handball player

== See also ==
- Cecelie
- Cecily
- Sidsel
