= Cecelia =

Cecelia is a variation of the given name Cecilia. People with the name include:

- Cecelia Adkins (1923–2007, African-American publisher
- Cecelia Ager (1902–1981), American film critic and reporter
- Cecelia Ahern (born 1981), Irish novelist
- Cecelia Akagu (fl. 2010s–2020s), Nigerian Army brigadier general
- Cecelia Antoinette (1949–2020), American actress, comedian, and writer
- Cecelia Ayanori Bukari-Yakubu (fl. 1960s), Ghanaian politician
- Cecelia Svinth Carpenter (1924–2010), first historian to write in detail about the Nisqually people
- Cecelia Condit (born 1947), American video artist
- Cecelia Cortes (born 1989), American professional squash player
- Cecelia Frey (born 1936), Canadian poet, novelist, and short story writer
- Cecelia Kizer (born 1997), American soccer player
- Cecelia Lee Fung-Sing (born 1933), Chinese actress and Cantonese opera singer from Hong Kong
- Cecelia Goetz (1917–2004), American lawyer and bankruptcy judge
- Cecelia González (fl. 2020s), American politician serving in the Nevada Assembly
- Cecelia Hall (fl. 1970s–2010s), American sound designer and sound editor
- Cecelia Holland (born 1943), American historical fiction novelist
- Cecelia Joyce (born 1983), Irish cricketer
- Cecelia Kenyon (1923–1990), American political scientist
- Cecilia Payne-Gaposchkin (1900–1979), British-born American astronomer and astrophysicist.
- Cecelia Pedescleaux (born 1945), African-American quilter of traditional and art quilts
- Cecelia Peters, Australian actor
- Cecelia Cabaniss Saunders (1879–1966), African-American civil rights leader
- Cecelia Moore Shelley (1893–1986), Australian trade union official and women's rights activist
- Cecelia Tichi (born 1942), American academic and author of mystery novels
- Cecelia Watson (fl. 2010s–2020s), American author and historian
- Cecelia Wolstenholme (1915–1968), English competitive swimmer

== See also ==
- CeCe (disambiguation)
- Cecilia
- Cecilie
- Cecelie
