= 1954 in Norwegian music =

The following is a list of notable events and releases of the year 1954 in Norwegian music.

== Events ==
=== June ===
- 1 – The 2nd Bergen International Festival started in Bergen, Norway (June 1 – 15).

== Deaths ==
January

- 21 – Per Reidarson, composer, violinist, and music critic (born 1879).

March

- 21 – Hanna Marie Hansen, composer, violinist, and music critic (born 1875).

== Births ==
January

- 14 – Gunnar Andreas Berg, guitarist, music teacher, and record label manager.

February

- 16 – Torbjørn Sunde, jazz trombonist.
- 18 – Bertil Palmar Johansen, contemporary composer and violinist.

March

- 17 – Bjørn Eidsvåg, singer and songwriter.
- 21 – Haakon Graf, jazz pianist, keyboardist, composer, music arranger and record producer.
- 27
  - Helge Iberg, contemporary composer.
  - Paolo Vinaccia, composer, jazz drummer, and percussionist (died 2019).

April

- 1 – Knut Værnes, jazz guitarist, composer, and band leader.
- 6 – Knut Stensholm, drummer in the band Sambandet (died 2010).
- 22 – Håkon Berge, contemporary composer, conductor, and music arranger.
- 28 – Frank Jakobsen, jazz drummer.

June

- 26 – Øystein Norvoll, jazz guitarist.

July

- 14 – Kristin Solli Schøien, author and composer.
- 19 – Cecilie Ore, composer.
- 25 – Svein Olav Blindheim, jazz double bassist, composer, and writer.

August

- 21 – Bodil Niska, jazz saxophonist.

September

- 8 – Hans Fredrik Jacobsen, multi-instrumentalist and composer.

October

- 8 – Lars Kristian Brynildsen, clarinetist, Bergen Philharmonic Orchestra (died 2005).

November

- 8 – Kåre Garnes, jazz upright bassist.

December

- 10 – Edvard Askeland, jazz bassist.
- 18 – Kåre Nordstoga, organist.

== See also ==
- 1954 in Norway
- Music of Norway
