= Ebba Lodden =

Norwegian politician (1913–1997)

Ebba Lodden, née Sjuve (9 November 1913 – 14 January 1997) was a Norwegian civil servant and politician for the Labour Party. She was the first female County Governor in Norway.

== Early life and career ==
She was born in Tønsberg as a daughter of tailor Edvard Anton Sjuve and Asta Johanne Hansen (1888–1974). In 1936 she married Ingolf Lodden (1905–1962) and took his surname. In her early career she worked as a housemaid (for politician Claudia Olsen), factory worker, office clerk for the Norwegian Seafarers' Union before running a manufacturing business from 1942 to 1957. She was involved in the Norwegian resistance movement, and had joined the Workers' Youth League at the age of sixteen.

== Later career ==
In 1945 she stood for election in the Market towns of Vestfold county. In the same year her husband was hired in the Arendal newspaper Tiden and the family moved there. Lodden was a member of Arendal city council from 1948 to 1963, serving as deputy mayor from 1954 to 1960. She served as a deputy representative to the Parliament of Norway from Aust-Agder during the terms 1950–1953, 1958–1961 and 1961–1965. She was a national board member of the Labour Party for sixteen years. From 1972 to 1974 she was a member of Tønsberg city council.

She was a member of Statens Velferdsråd for handelsflåten from 1953 to 1971, and from 1960 to 1977 she was the leader of the Norwegian Consumer Council. She also had a parallel civil servant career, in Tønsberg municipality from 1963. From 1967 to 1974 she was the municipal director of social affairs. Her career as a public servant toned out with the post of County Governor of Aust-Agder, which she held from 1974 to 1983. She was the first female County Governor in Norway.

Lodden was a board member of Vestfold Hospital from 1968 to 1974, and chaired Rikshospitalet from 1978 to 1982. She also chaired the board of Statens edruskapsdirektorat, a predecessor of the Norwegian Directorate of Health, from 1980 to 1981. She was later deputy chair from 1982 to 1988, and a board member from 1989 to 1990.

In 1977 she was decorated as a Commander of the Royal Norwegian Order of St. Olav. She died in January 1997 in Tønsberg.

Government offices
| Preceded by Ragnar Christiansen | Leader of the Norwegian Consumer Council; 1960–1977 | Succeeded by Gro Hillestad Thune |
| Preceded by Henrik Svensen | County Governor of Aust-Agder; 1974–1983 | Succeeded by Signe Marie Stray Ryssdal |
