= Gro Hillestad Thune =

Norwegian jurist and politician

Gro Hillestad Thune (born 19 January 1943) is a Norwegian jurist and politician for the Labour Party.

Born in Oslo, she resided at Nesodden and graduated with the cand.jur. degree in 1967. In 1974–75 she was the secretary in a Labour Party working group on consumer policy. She served as a deputy representative to the Parliament of Norway from Akershus during the term 1977–1981. In total she met during 14 days of parliamentary session.

She chaired the Norwegian Consumer Council from 1977 to 1984. She was a member of the board of NAVF from 1980 to 1982 and the National Institute for Consumer Research from 1980 to 1984, and chaired the board of Radiumhospitalet from 1980 to 1985.

A lawyer by profession, she was a member of the European Commission of Human Rights from 1982 to 1998. In 2025 she was decorated as a Knight, First Class of the Order of St. Olav

Civic offices
| Preceded by Ebba Lodden | Leader of the Norwegian Consumer Council; 1977–1984 | Succeeded by Kristin Moe |
