= Anne-Lise Bakken =

Norwegian politician (born 1952)

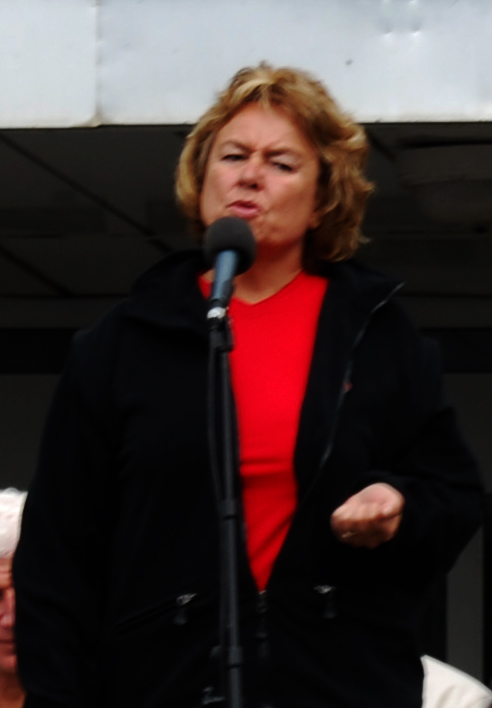
Anne-Lise Bakken

Anne-Lise Bakken (born 30 March 1952) is a Norwegian politician for the Labour Party. She was a member of the Norwegian Parliamentfrom 1977–1989. In 1986 she was appointed Minister of Administration and Consumer Affairs in the Second Brundtland Government, but was forced to retire due to perceived misconduct in 1988.

Civic offices
| Preceded by Kristin Moe | Leader of the Norwegian Consumer Council; 1993–1999 | Succeeded by Bente Haukland Næss |
