= Ingvaldsen =

Ingvaldsen is a surname. Notable people with the surname include:

- Bernt Ingvaldsen (1902–1985), Norwegian politician
- Elisabeth Ingvaldsen, Norwegian orienteering competitor
- Jan-Olav Ingvaldsen (1954–2021), Norwegian politician
- Ole Ingvaldsen (born 1948), Norwegian curler and curling coach
- Ole Marius Ingvaldsen (born 1985), Norwegian ski jumper
