= Haukland =

Haukland is a Norwegian surname. Notable people with the surname include:

- Hagrup Haukland, Norwegian soldier
- Ida Haukland, Norwegian heavy metal singer and bassist in Triosphere
- Bente Haukland Næss (born 1954), Norwegian businesswoman and politician
