= Sidsel =

Sidsel is a given name. Notable people with the name include:

- Sidsel Bauck (1929–2005), Norwegian trade unionist and politician
- Sidsel Dalen (born 1969), Norwegian journalist and crime fiction writer
- Sidsel Ekholdt (born 1956), Norwegian artistic gymnast
- Sidsel Endresen (born 1952), Norwegian singer, composer, and actress
- Sidsel Meineche Hansen (born 1981), London-based Danish visual artist
- Sidsel Mørck (born 1937), Norwegian poet, novelist and columnist
- Sidsel Bodholt Nielsen (born 1989), Danish handball player
- Sidsel Owren, Norwegian ski-orienteering competitor
- Sidsel Ryen (born 1943), Norwegian actress
- Sidsel Ben Semmane (born 1988), Danish musician known by the stage name Sémmane
- Sidsel Ulfstand (died 1575), Danish (Scanian) landholder and county administrator
- Sidsel Wold (born 1959), Norwegian journalist and non-fiction writer
