= Wenche Andersen =

Norwegian chef

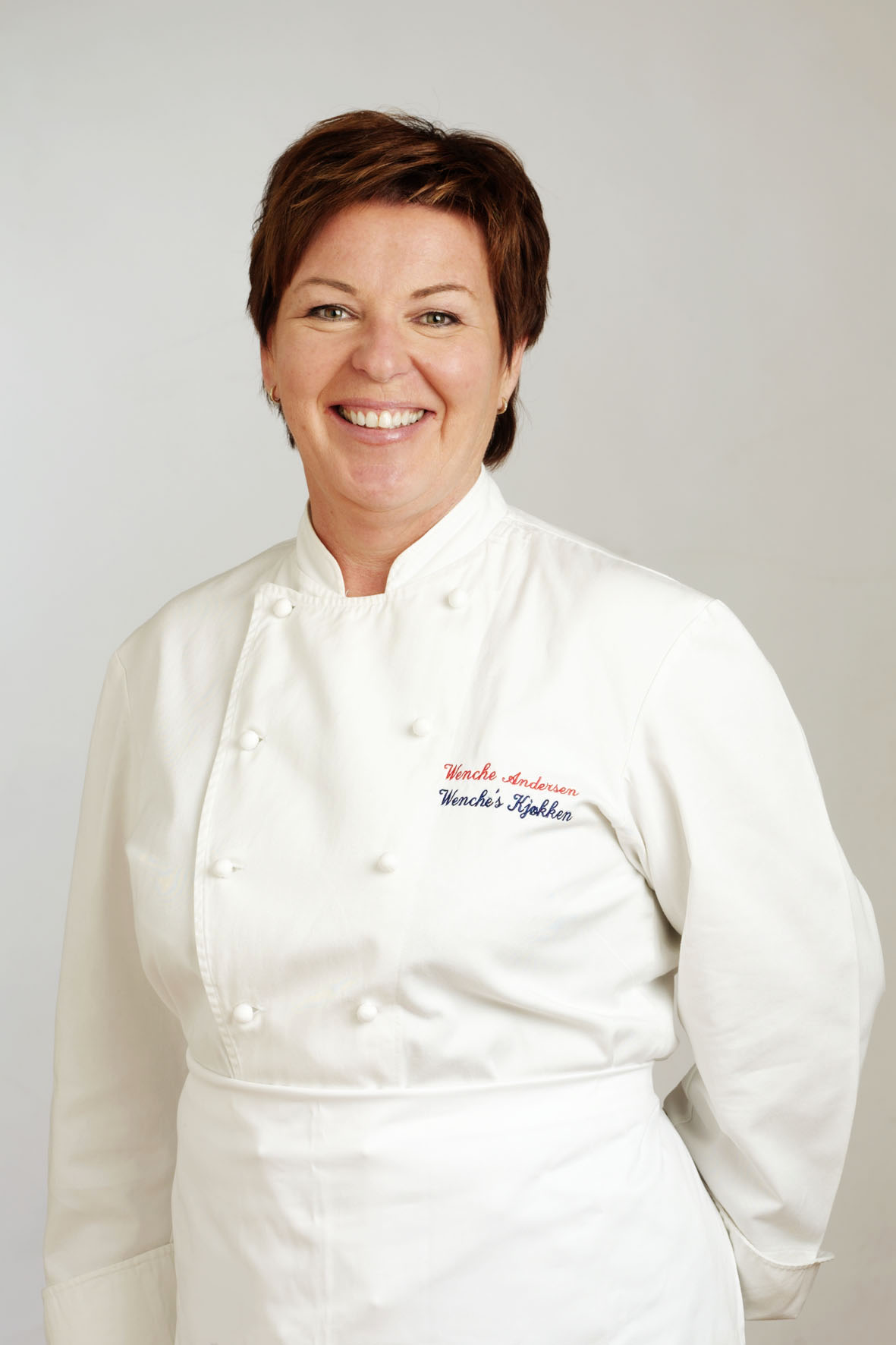
- Born: 10 July 1954 (age 71); Lommedalen, Norway
- Occupation: Chef
- Known for: Chef

Wenche Andersen (born 10 July 1954) is a Norwegian television chef.

She has worked as a television chef in TV 2 since 1994 at God morgen Norge. She had previously worked for the Opplysningskontoret for kjøtt (office for information about meat).

In 2006 she was appointed "Nordic food ambassador" in a project subordinate to the Nordic Council of Ministers. In 2017, she won the honor prize (hedersprisen) at Gullruten. The award was handed to her by the prime minister Erna Solberg.

She has authored at least 19 cookbooks.
