= Cecelie =

Cecelie is a feminine given name.

== People with the name ==
- Cecelie Berry, American writer
- Cecelie Williams, American politician from Missouri

== See also ==
- Cecelia
- Cecele
- Cecilie
