= Kristin Moe =

Norwegian politician (1954–2023)

Kristin Heidi Elisabeth Moe (25 November 1954 – 18 August 2023) was a Norwegian politician for the Conservative Party.

== Life and career ==
Kristin Moe was born in Asker. She was head of the Norwegian Consumer Council from 1984 to 1993. She was also elected to Asker municipal council in 1983, and worked as city commissioner's secretary in Oslo from 1986 to 1987. She was a deputy member of the Norwegian Parliament during the term 1989–1993.

Moe died on 18 August 2023, at the age of 68.

Civic offices
Preceded by Gro Hillestad Thune	Leader of the Norwegian Consumer Council; 1984–1993	Succeeded by Anne-Lise Bakken
