= Union of Employees in Commerce and Offices =

Trade union in Norway

HK
- Union of Employees in Commerce and Offices
- Handel og Kontor I Norge
- Founded: 1908
- Headquarters: Oslo, Norway
- Location: Norway
- Members: 60,000
- Key people: Christopher Beckham, president
- Affiliations: LO, UNI
- Website: www.handelogkontor.no

The Union of Employees in Commerce and Offices (Norwegian: Handel og Kontor i Norge) (HK) is a trade union in Norway.

The union was founded in 1908, with the merger of 21 local unions of shop and office workers. It initially struggled financially, but these slowly improved as the union was centralised. Following years as a non-political organisation, leader Albert Raaen persuaded it to align with the social democratic movement, and it affiliated to the Norwegian Confederation of Trade Unions in 1931. Other unions were able to take solidarity action in support of HK, which began recruiting strongly among young workers.

Raaen was arrested in 1941, during the Nazi occupation, and a new leader was imposed, while the union's staff were forced to continue in their posts, although much of the union was secretly involved in the Norwegian resistance.

After World War II, the union grew, with many new collective agreements and campaigned for equal pay between men and women. Membership peaked at 61,000 in 1987, then declined, but later recovered, reaching 74,050 in 2019.

== Presidents ==
1908: Fridthjov Nilssen
1927: Albert Raaen
1941: Michael Berg (under Nazi occupation)
1945: Alfred Nilsen
1964: Otto Totland
1988: Sidsel Bauck
1994: Sture Arntzen
2013: Trine Lise Sundnes
2020: Christopher Beckham
