= Sture Arntzen =

Norwegian trade unionist (born 1948)

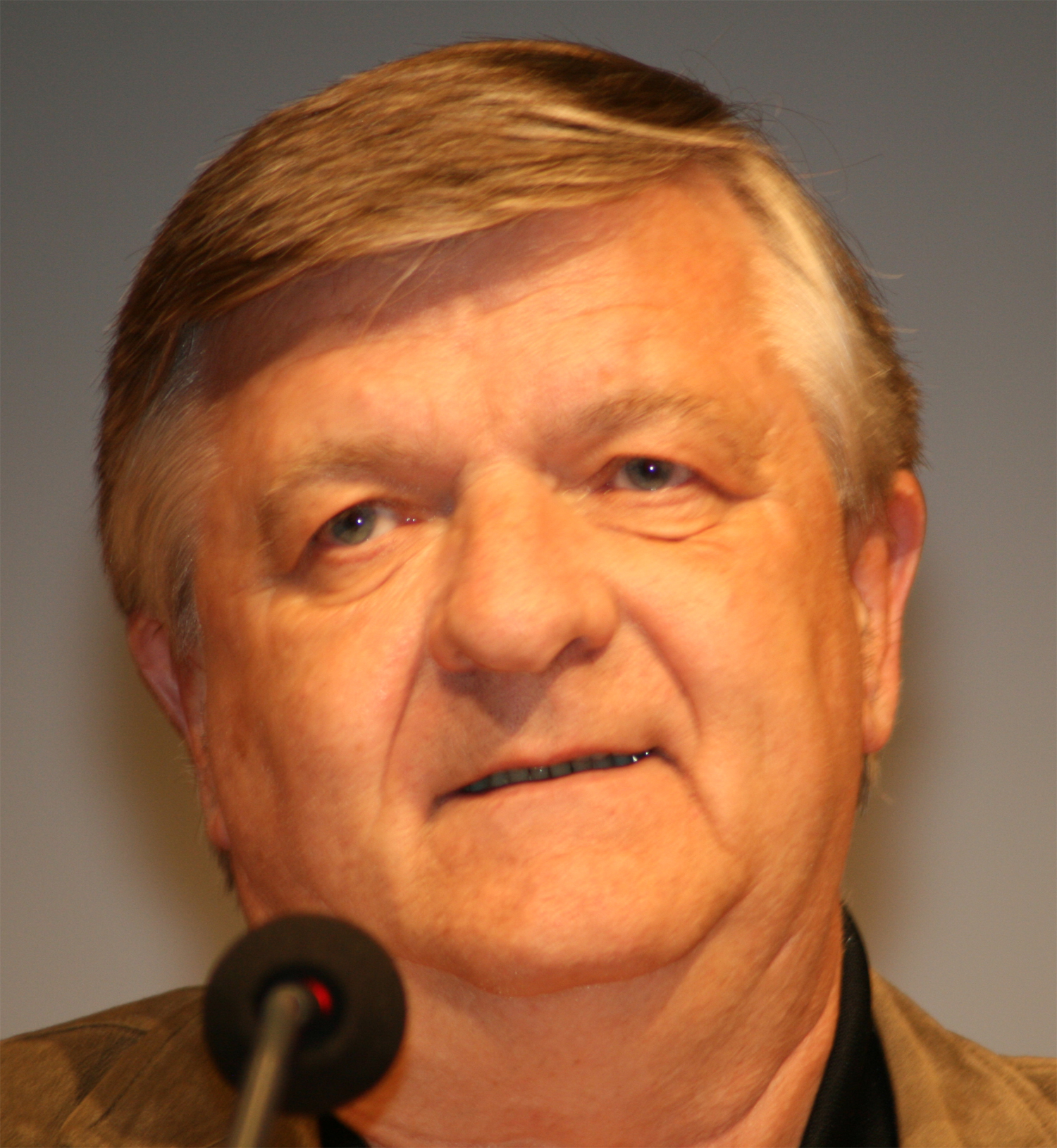
Sture Arntzen (2009)

Sture Arntzen (born 24 November 1948) is a Norwegian trade unionist.

Having started an education as a first mate, he left this after two years and instead worked as a salesman. He spent the years 1971 to 1975 as a member of Trondheim city council for the Labour Party. In 1975 he became a full-time trade unionist. In 1994 he took over as leader of Union of Employees in Commerce and Offices, having been deputy leader since 1988.
