= Cecilie Jørgensen =

Norwegian actress and opera singer (1814–1890)

Cecilie Jørgensen (1814 - 1890) was a Norwegian (originally Danish) stage actress and opera singer. She was active at the Christiania Theatre in Oslo in 1835-63. She was married to the actor and opera singer Christian Jørgensen.

She belonged to the acting elite in Norway in the first half of the 19th century, when the Christiania Theatre was the only standing stage in Norway, and dominated by actors of Danish origin. She is described as a very useful and able actor. She is most known for her successful roles as aristocratic ladies in burgher comedies, but she was also a singer and able to perform when the theatre occasionally offered opera performances.
