= Bente Haukland Næss =

Bente Haukland Næss (born 25 September 1954) is the former chair of the Norwegian Consumer Council. She is the CEO of Rembra, an engineering consultancy firm.

She has been a member of the board of Norsk Forening for Kvalitet og Risikostyring, the Ideas Bank Foundation, and Varingen.

A cand.mag. by education, she has been a member of Nittedal municipal council for sixteen years, representing the Christian Democratic Party. She resides in Hagan.

Civic offices
Preceded by Anne-Lise Bakken	Chair of the Norwegian Consumer Council; 1999–2006	Succeeded by Wenche Frølich
