= Khalid Salimi =

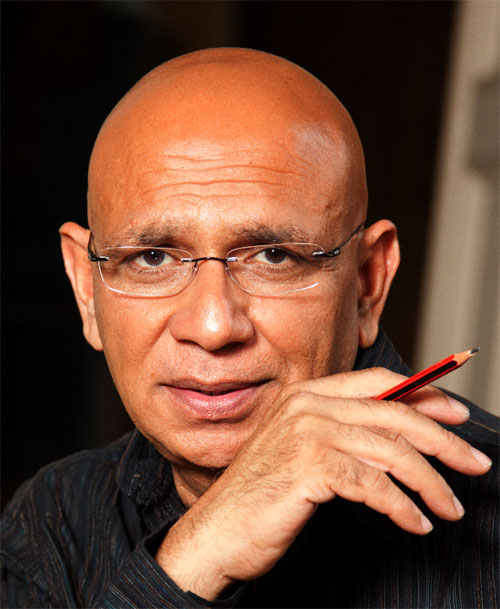
Khalid Salimi

Khalid Salimi (Urdu: خالد سلیم; born 23 May 1954) is a human rights activist, culture and arts critic, former music columnist for weekly Morgenbladet and an advisor on cross-cultural and art-related issues for the Nordic Culture Fund. He is artistic director of international performing arts festival Mela Festival, organized annually in Oslo, Norway by Mela Foundation, and Chief Editor of Samora Forum Magazine. He is currently director of Melahouse, an independent cultural community center of performing arts. Salimi is regarded as one of the most influential intellectuals in Norway with an immigrant background.

== Biography ==
Salimi was born in Karachi and grew up in Lahore. At the age of 13, he began to contribute by writing in daily newspapers. He later published several short stories which were also aired in Pakistan Broadcasting Corporation, PBC. In the period 1972-1973 he wrote radio plays for children for Multan Division of PBC. Shortly after he became editor of a weekly children's and youth supplement in the daily newspaper, Kohistan. In 1974 he was elected Information Secretary of the Jadid Adbi Tehrik, Movement for Contemporary Literature in Lahore.

== Political activism ==
Salimi has worked for immigrants and other minorities’ rights and been engaged in debates on racism and discrimination since the late 1970s. In 1978 he helped to start Immigrant Collective in Oslo which, among other activities, was behind the creation and publication of the anti-racist magazine Immigranten (today Samora Forum). The collective was one of the first to get a license to start a local radio channel in Norway, called Radio Immigrants, which later became Tellus Radio. Salimi also founded the Norwegian Centre Against Racism (Antirasistisk Senter), where he was the center's Director until 1996. As a spokesperson for the Antirasistisk Senter, he has insisted that the center should be independent of any political parties and religious affiliation. Through a series of media appearances and public debates, Salimi became the best-known Norwegian-Pakistani activist in Norway during the 1980s and 1990s. Salimi was also in the leadership of Gro Harlem Brundtland's campaign called All Different All Equal.

== Writing and publishing ==
After he moved to Norway in 1976, Salimi wrote for Universitas, Ny Tid and Contrast in 77/79, before he enrolled into Academy of Journalism (1981–82) Khalid Salimi has been publishing numerous articles and essays. Salimi has been the Chief Editor of journal Samora Forum Magazine since 1979 and was columnist for the newspaper Dagbladet in 2001–2002. He was also a regular contributor to various publications as well as a music columnist in weekly Morgenbladet.

=== Books ===
- Sparks in the Snow, w / Nirmal Brahmachari, Lars Amund Vaage, et al., 1998
- Diversity & Equality, 1996. Damm Cappelen
- Roses in the Snow: an anthology of writings of the immigrants in Norway, Sweden and Denmark (ed.), 1988
- Roots of Racism: w / Mari Linløkken, 1987, on racial prejudices in Norway.

== Other achievements ==
- Khalid Salimi became a member of Salman Rushdie's support committee in 1985.
- Received the Freedom Prize, awarded by the Swedish Dagens Nyheter together with other leaders of SOS Racism, 1985
- He has been a Member of the Board of Litteraturhuset ( House of Literature. Oslo) from its inception in 2007 til the end of 2012.
- Salimi was Deputy Chairman of the Arts Council, Norway, (1996-2004) where he also led the council's new area of focus for enhancing cultural diversity in the field of arts and culture; Mosaic.
- Chairman for the white paper, ”Policy and Action Plan for Cultural Diversity for the Nordic Council of Ministers” (1997).
- Board member, Norwegian P.E.N. 1998 - 2003
- Received Sitara-i-Khidmat from the Government of Pakistan acknowledging his contributions to promoting Arts and Culture
