= Cecelia Akagu =

Nigerian army general

Cecilia Akagu
- Born: Ankpa, Kogi State, Nigeria
- Citizenship: Nigerian
- Occupations: Army officer, Accountant
- Known for: First Nigerian Army couple with spouse both attaining rank of Brigadier General
- Title: Director of Army Accounts Inspectorate
- Spouse: Brigadier General Clifford Wanda
- Children: 2

Cecilia Akagu is a Brigadier General in Nigerian Army. She is an accountant and serves in the Accounts Directorate of the Army. She is married to Clifford Wanda who is also a Brigadier General in Nigerian Army. They are the first couple to both attain the rank of Brigadier General in the Nigerian Army.

== Career and family life ==
Cecilia Akagu is a native of Ankpa in Ankpa Local Government Area of Kogi State, Nigeria. She is an accountant of the Finance Corp in Nigerian Army. She is the Director of Army Accounts Inspectorate. She is married to Mr. Clifford Wanda who is also a Brigadier General in Nigerian Army. Mr. Clifford Wanda is from Enugu Ngwo village in Enugu North Local Government Area of Enugu State, Nigeria. Brigadier General Cecilia Akagu and Brigadier General Clifford Wanda are not the first commissioned officers to be married in the Nigerian Army. However, they are the first couple to both attain the rank of Brigadier General as a married couple. Cecilia Akagu and Clifford Wanda met in 1990 during their orientation course in Nigerian Army. Having been both commissioned, they started their orientation course in Jaji. They were course mates during the orientation even though Cecilia Akagu was a Second Lieutenant and Clifford Wanda was a Lieutenant during the course. They have two children, a son and a daughter.

== See also ==
- Nigerian Army
- Tukur Yusuf Buratai
