= Cecilie French =

British chemist (1915–1962)

Cecilie Mary French
- Born: 23 October 1915; London
- Died: 6 August 1962 (aged 46–47); Epsom
- Occupation: Chemist
- Known for: Specialist in magnetochemistry.

Cecilie Mary French (23 October 1915 – 6 August 1962) was a British chemist and lecturer specialising in magnetochemistry.

== Early life and education ==
French was born in London on 23 October 1915 and educated at Walthamsaw Girls County School. She obtained her BSc in chemistry from University College London in 1937.

== Early career ==
From 1938 to 1939 French was a demonstrator in chemistry at UCL. As such, she was one of the very few women appointed to the Chemistry Department at University College London before the Second World War. She did research with Christopher Ingold and Cecil Wilson, which helped her achieve her PhD in 1940. This same year, she also she undertook a position in Imperial Chemical Industries (ICI) as a research chemist.

In late 1940, she accepted a new job as a demonstrator and assistant lecturer in physical and organic chemistry at Bedford University. However, Bedford had been evacuated to Cambridge University to avoid the heavy bombing that was being faced in London.

== Career at Queen Mary's University ==
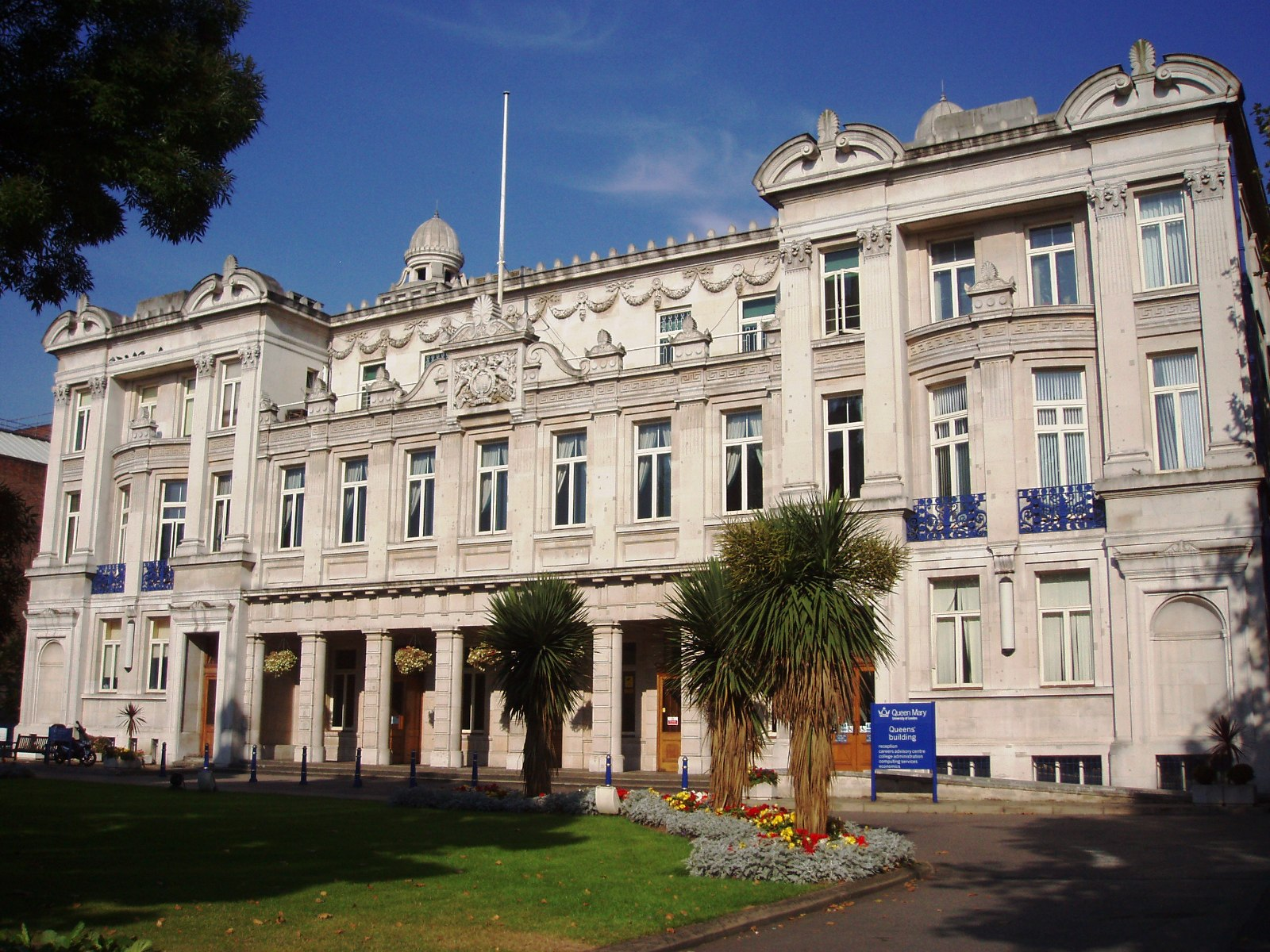
The Queens' Building at Queen Mary College, where French worked for much of her career.

Despite being given many teaching duties, Cecilie started her research in magnetochemistry with James Spencer. As well as Bedford College being evacuated, Queen Mary's College (QMC) was also evacuated to Cambridge which began French's involvement with QMC. After the bombings in London have died down the evacuees returned to Bedford and QMC to London in 1944. At this point she was offered a position as lecturer in Inorganic and Physical Chemistry at QMC.

She stayed with QMC for the rest of her life, during which she was promoted to a senior lecturer in 1961. Despite heavy teaching load, French maintained a very impressive research output in magnetochemistry the electrochemistry of nonaqueous solvents and the synthesising of novel boron compounds. She collaborated on research with Violet Trew at Bedford College until the arrival of the Gouy balance at QMC whereupon she began collaborating with D. Harrison there instead. During her time at QMC, French's tutelage and supervision of twenty-three research graduates also resulted in almost fifty publications.

== Later life ==
French travelled widely over her years in the Far East and in the United States, spending a year in Pennsylvania State University. When she turned forty, her health began to deteriorate, however:

"With great courage and determination, as well as cheerfulness, she continued her work as usual despite partial blindness and increasing disability. At this stage, her long-standing practice of lecturing without notes was invaluable to her. She learned Braille and characteristically gave her services to the National Institute for the Blind in advising them about the transliteration of scientific and mathematic symbols."

== Honours and legacy ==
French was invited to return to Pennsylvania State in 1962 to give the honorary Marie Curie lecture but ill health prevented her from making it. French died 6 August 1962 in Epsom, Surrey. Her obituarist, Dorothea Grove recorded that:

"Dr. French was an outstanding university teacher and will be remembered with gratitude by generations of undergraduates in whose welfare she took a keen personal interest. She proved her ability during the difficult post-war years when classes were swollen with ex-servicemen and, for a number of years, she was also responsible for teaching the first M.B. students of the London Hospital."
