= Jan Bugge-Mahrt =

Norwegian diplomat (born 1954)

Jan Bugge-Mahrt (born 1954) is a Norwegian diplomat.

In 2004, he was appointed as the Norwegian ambassador to Saudi Arabia. The relations between Norway and Saudi Arabia are considered important, because of the shared emphasis on petroleum in the two countries' economies. In 2005, he was also named the Norwegian ambassador to both Oman and Yemen.

Before becoming an ambassador, he held other posts in the diplomatic hierarchy, including embassy councilor in Belgium and assistant secretary in the Ministry of Foreign Affairs. In 2010, he was named department head in the Ministry of Foreign Affairs.
