= Sidsel Bauck =

Norwegian trade unionist

Sidsel Gerd Bauck (1929 in Oslo – 2005) was a Norwegian trade unionist and politician.

She started working for the union Union of Employees in Commerce and Offices in 1962, then became elected deputy leader in 1980. From 1988 to 1994 she was the president of the union.
