= Cecilie Risøe =

Norwegian physician (born 1952)

°

Cecilie Risøe (born 13 August 1952) is a Norwegian physician and cardiologist.

She was President of the Norwegian Society of Cardiology from 2005 to 2009 and is Chairman of the Norwegian Council on Cardiovascular Diseases. She was a member of the executive board of the Norwegian Medical Association from 2008 to 2013. She is a senior consultant cardiologist at Oslo University Hospital, Rikshospitalet.

She earned her MD at the University of Oslo in 1980 and her Med.Sc.D. on heart failure at the same university in 1991.

She is married to the neurosurgeon Ole Jørgen Kirkeby.
