= Cecelia Watson =

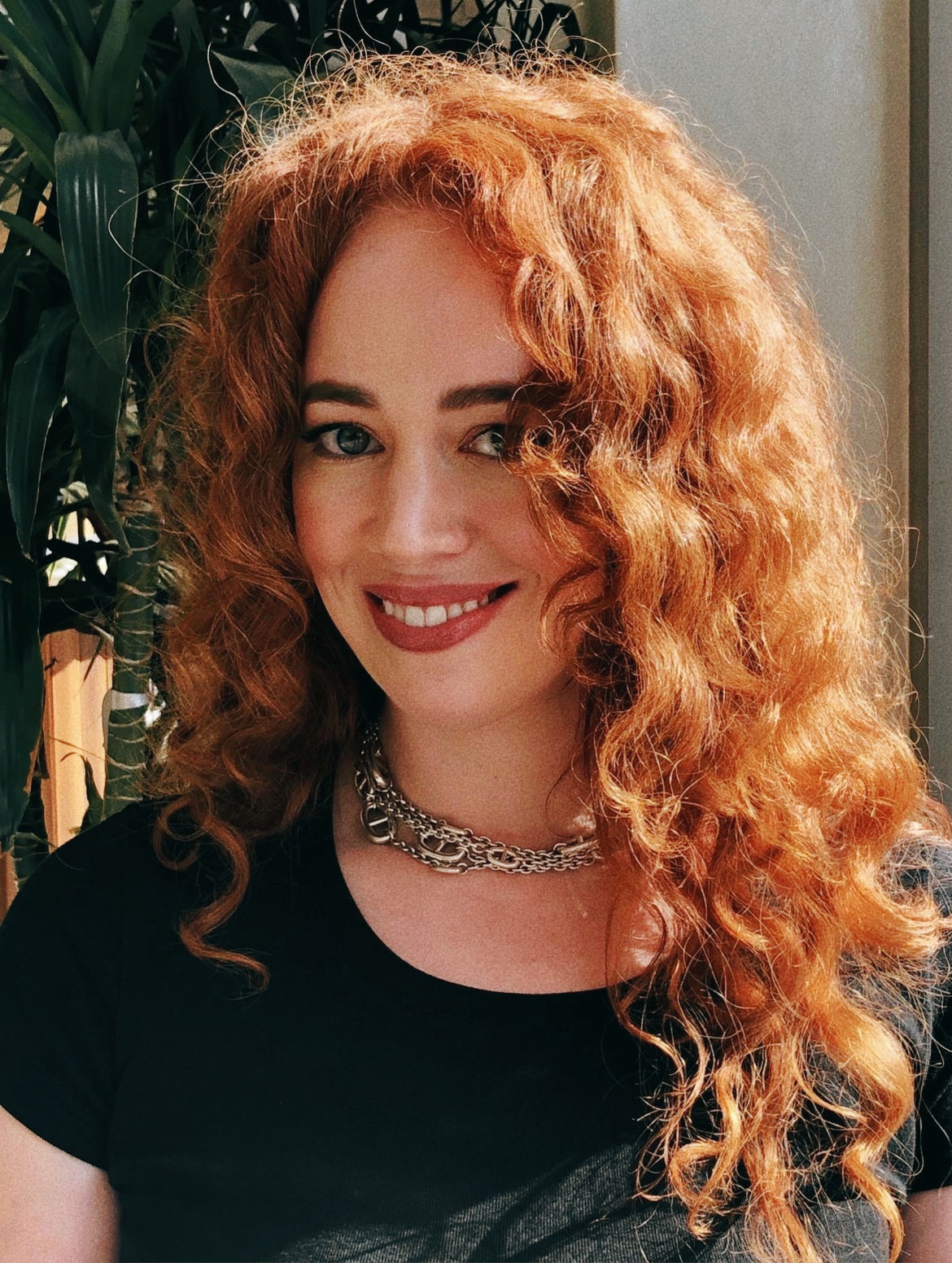
- Cecelia Watson (2019)
- Born: United States
- Title: Scholar in Residence at Bard College
- Awards: American Council of Learned Societies New Faculty Fellow

Academic background
- Education: University of Chicago (Ph.D., M.A.); St. John's College (Annapolis/Santa Fe) (B.A.)
- Doctoral advisor: Robert J. Richards
- Other advisors: Lorraine Daston

Academic work
- Discipline: History and philosophy of science
- Writing career
- Language: English
- Genre: Nonfiction
- Notable works: Semicolon: The Past, Present, and Future of a Misunderstood Mark
- Website: ceceliawatson.com

Cecelia Watson is an American author, and a historian and philosopher of science.

== Career ==
Watson attended St. John's College (Annapolis/Santa Fe), earning a B.A. in Liberal Arts. She then did graduate work at the University of Chicago under the supervision of Robert J. Richards and Lorraine Daston. She earned an M.A. in Philosophy and a Ph.D. in Conceptual and Historical Studies of Science.

From 2011 to 2013, she was a postdoctoral fellow at the Max Planck Institute for the History of Science and a scientific advisor to Haus der Kulturen der Welt, working on a joint project on the Anthropocene hypothesis. She then was awarded an American Council of Learned Societies New Faculty Fellowship, which she undertook at Yale University from 2013 to 2015 with a joint appointment in the Department of Philosophy and the Program in the Humanities.

She is currently Scholar in Residence at Bard College, with no departmental affiliation listed. She has stated that she considers her academic work equally informed by the disciplines of history and of philosophy and that she rejects traditional disciplinary boundaries and specializations.

== Writing ==
Watson has written for The New York Times, NBC, The Paris Review, LitHub, and The Millions. Her first book, Semicolon: The Past, Present and Future of a Misunderstood Mark was published in July 2019 by HarperCollins in the United States. The book argued in favor of the use of semicolons, and against traditional grammar rules.

A version of the book for British readers was published in the United Kingdom by 4th Estate with the title Semicolon: How a Misunderstood Punctuation Mark Can Improve Your Writing, Enrich Your Reading and Even Change Your Life.

In February 2022, Publishers Weekly announced that Watson's second book, covering the world of watch collecting and the watch industry, had been acquired by Riverhead Books.
