= Helge Bjørnsen =

Norwegian politician (born 1954)

Deputy representative to the Parliament of Norway
- In office 1997–2005
- Constituency: Hedmark

Personal details
- Born: 17 September 1954 (age 72) Oslo, Norway
- Party: Socialist Left Party
- Education: Diakonhjemmet University College

Helge Bjørnsen (born 17 September 1954) is a Norwegian politician for the Socialist Left Party.

He was born in Oslo as a son of presiding judge Sverre Bjørnsen and translator Hilde Braun. He took his primary and secondary education in Oslo, Bærum, and Ullensaker, and attended Skjeberg Folk High School (in Skjeberg) from 1970 to 1971. From 1979 to 1982 he attended Diakonhjemmet University College.

Before 1982 he led a local chapter of the Socialist Left Party in Frogner. He led the chapter in Stange from 1982, and served as a member of the municipal council for Stange Municipality from 1987 to 2003. He served as a deputy representative to the Parliament of Norway from Hedmark during the terms 1997–2001 and 2001–2005, and met during 143 days of parliamentary session.
