= Cecilie Dahl =

Norwegian artist (1960)

Cecilie Dahl is an artist currently living and working in New York City and in Oslo, Norway.

He was born in Oslo, Norway, in 1960. She grew up in Oslo and Accra, the capital city of Ghana. She has an M.A. in Fine Art from The Art Academy in Oslo, Norway, and a diploma in Architectural Art and Design from Bournemouth and Poole College of Art in the United Kingdom. She has work in collections across Europe and in America. Malmö Konsthall in Sweden holds 25 of her works. Her works are part of the Elisabeth Sackler Center for Feminist Art collection, which is affiliated with the Brooklyn Museum.

Dahl participated in the National and International Studio Program of the Museum of Modern Art in New York in 1993–1994.

In 2007 Dahl had a solo exhibition, Cruising Paradise, at Nortälje Konsthall in Sweden, and took part in the group exhibition I Love Malmö at the Turku Art Museum.

In an artist statement Dahl says that her interests are in 'relations between people, how we intuitively perceive and negotiate the space between the others and ourselves, and how our experience of proximity is open to illusions.'
