= Per Thomas Andersen =

Norwegian literary historian and novelist

Per Thomas Andersen (8 February 1954 – 13 December 2023) was a Norwegian literary historian and novelist.

He was appointed professor at the University of Tromsø from 1992, and at the University of Oslo from 1993. His thesis from 1992 treated the decadence of Scandinavian literature of the period from 1880 to 1900. Among his other scientific works are Stein Mehren – en logosdikter from 1982, Norsk litteraturhistorie from 2001, and Tankevaser from 2003. He published the novels Hold in 1985 and Arr in 1992. He was a fellow of the Norwegian Academy of Science and Letters. In 2023 he received the King's Medal of Merit.

Andersen died in Sandvika on 13 December 2023, at the age of 69.
