= Jon Øyvind Odland =

Norwegian politician (born 1954)

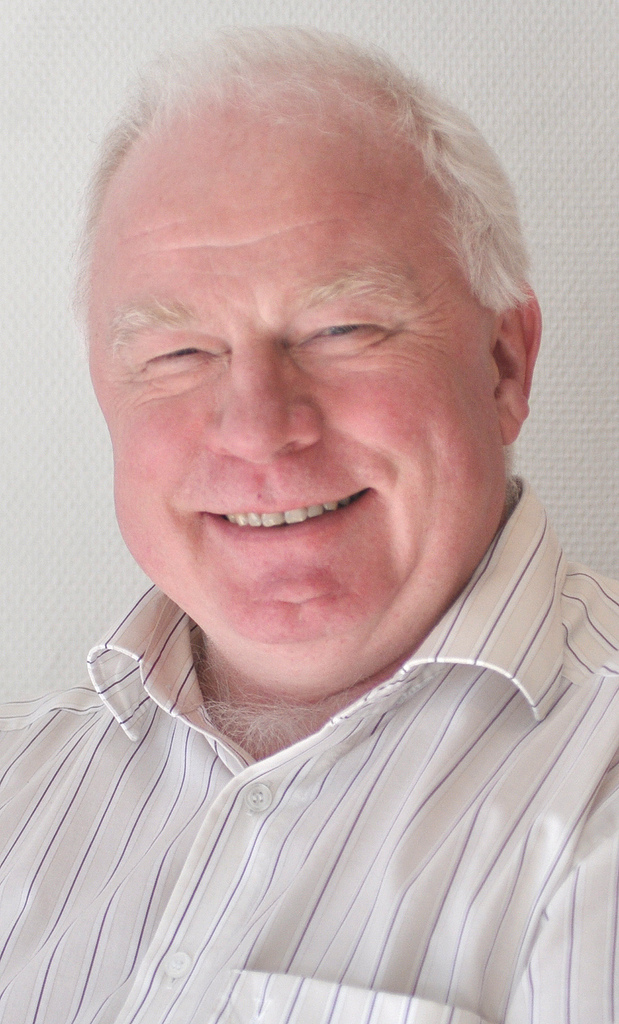
Jon Øyvind Odland

Jon Øyvind Odland (born 29 May 1954) is a Norwegian politician for the Centre Party.

== Career ==
He served as a deputy representative to the Parliament of Norway from Nordland during the term 2005–2009 and 2009–2013. In total, he met during 106 days of parliamentary session.
