= Cecelia Tichi =

American author

- Born: April 10, 1942 (age 84); Pittsburgh, Pennsylvania, US
- Occupations: Author; academic; researcher
- Title: Gertrude Conaway Vanderbilt Professor of English
- Awards: Jay B. Hubbell Award for lifetime achievement in American literary study, American Literature Society of the Modern Language Association

Academic background
- Education: B.A., English Literature; M.A., English Literature; Ph.D., English-American Literature
- Alma mater: Pennsylvania State University; Johns Hopkins University; University of California, Davis

Academic work
- Institutions: Vanderbilt University

Cecelia Tichi (born April 10, 1942) is an American academic and author of mystery novels. She is the Gertrude Conaway Vanderbilt Professor of English and American Studies at Vanderbilt University. She is a former president of the American Studies Association, and the winner of the Jay B. Hubbell Medal for lifetime achievement in American literature.

Tichi has published twelve books that span American popular culture and social history, from television to country music to the gear-and-girder technology that transformed the environment nationwide in the late 1800s and early 1900s.

Tichi was the Editor of Special Issue of South Atlantic Quarterly in 1995.

== Education ==
Tichi studied English Literature and received her bachelor's degree in 1964 from Pennsylvania State University and her master's degree in 1965 from Johns Hopkins University. In 1968, she completed her Doctoral studies in English-American Literature from University of California, Davis.

== Career ==
Tichi joined Boston University in 1968 as an assistant professor. She was promoted to associate professor in 1975, and to Professor, in 1980. In 1987, Tichi joined Vanderbilt University as an English Professor. She was appointed as William R. Kenan Jr. Professor of English in 1990 and as Gertrude Conaway Vanderbilt Professor of English at Vanderbilt University in 2015.

=== Books ===
Tichi has conducted research related to English Literature and has authored several fiction and non-fiction books based on American popular culture and social history. Her fiction novels include Jealous Heart, Cryin' Times, Fall to Pieces, Now You See Her and All in One Piece.

Tichi published her book New World, New Earth: Environmental Reform in American Literature from the Puritans through Whitman in 1979. The book revolves around environmental reforms in the context of literary consciousness of America. David Leverenz reviewed that the book "usefully calls attention to the American connection between landscape and millennium" and that "specialists will value chapters on Johnson and Barlow".

In 1991, Tichi's Electronic Hearth: Creating an American Television Culture was published and discussed the development of Americans' perception regarding TV in 5 decades. Tichi's thinking regarding the book is reviewed as "original" and her arguments as "fresh and fascinating." According to Kirkus Reviews, "Tichi offers far more insights than did Watching America".

Tichi's book, High Lonesome: The American Culture of Country Music, was published in 1994 and explores the country music in American culture. According to Ruth Banes from University of South Florida, "this book is path-breaking, the first to explore themes in country music as they parallel American art and literature". She stated that "the book is gracefully written, jargon-free, highly original, and engaging throughout" and "Tichi's astonishing interdisciplinary imagination enables her to bridge the gaps between popular culture and high art, music and literature, poetry and painting".

In 2001, Tichi published Embodiment of a Nation: Human Form in American Places which examines the human body's connection with the American geographical experience. The book was reviewed as a "rollicking, energetic tour through some key geographical, cultural and historical American landmarks".

Tichi explored the two Gilded Ages through the perspectives of their muckrakers in her book, Exposes and Excess: Muckraking in America, 1900 / 2000, which is published in 2005. Her work is reviewed as "a quietly eloquent intervention in contemporary critical practice". According to James Aucoin, the book is "one of an occasional series issued by the University of Pennsylvania Press that encourages the personal touch".

In 2009, Tichi published Civic Passions: Seven Who Launched Progressive America (And What They Teach Us) which revolves around profiling seven citizen activists and reformers of the Gilded Age and Progressive Era. Daniel Burnstein reviewed that "Tichi provides an excellent broad introduction to many aspects of that era and the Gilded Age that preceded it" and that the book "is an accurate and thoughtful synthesis, steeped in impressive research in both primary and secondary sources". Burnstein "highly recommended" the book as an "introductory work for undergraduate courses or for the general reader". The book is also reviewed as a "beautifully written assemblage of mini-biographies" that is "a welcome and crucially necessary addition" for the democracy; and as a "deeply significant, and compellingly passionate civic wake-up call".

Tichi published her book, What Would Mrs. Astor Do?: The Essential Guide to the Manners and Mores of the Gilded Age, in 2018. Publishers Weekly reviewed that "Tichi delivers a crisp survey of New York's upper-class world in the late 19th century", that is "presented with a breezy authority that keeps the pages turning, Tichi's book will captivate those interested in a light look at Americas fashionable gentry of eras past." Alida Becker from New York Times Book Review stated that "A new etiquette guide, by Cecelia Tichi, has just turned up, offering further proof that sliding around the naughty edges of society can be as informative as it is entertaining."

=== Mystery novels ===
Tichi has authored five mystery novels. Her books Jealous Heart and Cryin' Times were published in 1999 and the latter is reviewed as "carefully crafted and thoroughly detailed" and "A delightful new voice in Southern mystery". Tichi's third book in Kate Banning Mysteries called, Fall to Pieces, was published in 2000, and was reviewed as "An action-packed page turner with heart". In 2004, she published Now You See Her. In a review, Publishers Weekly stated that "Tishy does a good job conveying the feel of contemporary Boston" and that "Tishy's mystery thriller with a psychic twist introduces an engaging new heroine". Tichi's book All in One Piece was published in 2006, and follows the story of her character in Now You See Her. According to a review, "Plotting is not Tishy's forte, but her extrasensory glimpse of the 1912 Lawrence, Mass. mill strike and her fluid prose are almost compensation enough".

== Awards and honors ==
- 1972 - Study Fellowship, American Council of Learned Societies
- 1972 - Fellowship, Radcliffe Institute
- 1992 - Ellen Gregg Ingalls Award for Excellence in Undergraduate Teaching, Vanderbilt University
- 1996 - Mentor Award, Margaret Cuninggim Women's Center
- 1997 - Research Fellowship, Bellagio Center of the Rockefeller Foundation
- 2006-2007 - Kluge Chair of Modern Culture, Library of Congress
- 2007 - Harvie Branscomb Award, Vanderbilt University
- 2009 - Jay B. Hubbell Award for lifetime achievement in American literary study, American Literature Society of the Modern Language Association
- 2009, 2012 - Andrew W. Mellon Fellowship, Huntington Library

== Selected works ==
=== Books ===
- New World, New Earth: Environmental Reform in American Literature from the Puritans through Whitman (1979) ISBN 978-0-300-02287-2
- Shifting Gears: Technology, Literature, Culture in Modernist America (1987) ISBN 978-0-8078-4167-9
- Electronic Hearth: Creating an American Television Culture (1991) ISBN 978-0-19-506549-7
- High Lonesome: The American Culture of Country Music (1994) ISBN 978-0-8078-4608-7
- Cryin' Time (1998) ISBN 978-1-891847-01-1
- Jealous Heart (1999) ISBN 978-0-451-19678-1
- Fall to Pieces (1999) ISBN 978-1-891847-07-3
- Embodiment of a Nation: Human Form in American Places (2001) ISBN 978-0-674-00494-8
- Exposes and Excess: Muckraking in America, 1900/2000 (2005) ISBN 978-0-8122-1926-5
- Now You See Her (2006) ISBN 978-0-446-61355-2
- All in One Piece (2006) ISBN 978-0-89296-797-1
- Civic Passions: Seven Who Launched Progressive America (And What They Teach Us) (2009) ISBN 978-0-8078-9869-7
- Jack London: A Writer's Fight for a Better America (2015) ISBN 978-1-4696-2267-5
- What Would Mrs. Astor Do?: The Essential Guide to the Manners and Mores of the Gilded Age (2018) ISBN 978-1-4798-2685-8
- Gilded Age Cocktails: History, Lore, and Recipes from America's Golden Age (2020) ISBN 978-1-4798-0525-9

=== Articles ===
- Tichi, C. (1966). Tree of Life Imagery in the Poetry of Edward Taylor.
- Tichi, C. (1969). Thespis and the" Carnall Hipocrite": A Puritan Motive for Aversion to Drama. Early American Literature, 4(2), 86–103.
- Tichi, C. (1971). Spiritual Biography and the" Lords Remembrancers". The William and Mary Quarterly: A Magazine of Early American History, 64–85.
- Tichi, C. (1971). The Puritan Historians and their New Jerusalem. Early American Literature, 6(2), 143–155.
- Tichi, C. (1971). Longfellow's Motives for the Structure of" Hiawatha". American Literature, 42(4), 548–553.
