= Opplysningskontoret for egg og kjøtt =

Norwegian food industry organisation

Opplysningskontoret for egg og kjøtt ("The Information Office for Eggs and Meat") is a Norwegian private organisation which seeks to provide information and help on behalf of the Norwegian meat industry. It among other things receives 69 million Norwegian krone in annual subsidies from the Government of Norway.
