= Cecilie Landsverk =

Norwegian diplomat (born 1954)

Cecilie Landsverk (born 13 June 1954) is a Norwegian diplomat.

She is a cand.mag. by education. She started working abroad for the Norwegian Ministry of Foreign Affairs in 1982. She was a sub-director from 1998 to 2001 and a head of department from 2001 to 2006, both in the Ministry of Foreign Affairs. In 2006 she was appointed Norwegian ambassador to Turkey. In 2011 she was appointed Norwegian ambassador to Pakistan.
