= Håkon Berge =

Norwegian contemporary composer, conductor and arranger

Håkon Berge (born 22 April 1954) is a Norwegian contemporary composer, conductor and arranger.

Berge was born in Stavanger. He studied composition at the Music Department at the University of Stavanger and the Norwegian Academy of Music. As a composer, Berge has contributed to stage productions at institutions such as Rogaland Teater, Den Nationale Scene and Oslo's National Theatre. He has also contributed to TV productions, including the score for the domestically broadcast opera Gagarin – a space opera in 1991. Berge has penned a number of commissioned works, including a work written for the opening of the Bibliotheca Alexandrina, the opening work for Oslo's Nobel Peace Center and the 2008 European Brass Band Championship test piece Brass Blot.

As a freelancer, Berge has held positions as musical director, composer in residence and conductor at Norway's major theatres and has written music for more than 70 plays. In addition to his work on music for theatre productions, Berge has received commissions from the Norwegian Society of Composers, the Norwegian Authors' Union, Ultima Oslo Contemporary Music Festival, NRK and the Norwegian National Opera and Ballet.

Berge has held a number of positions on the Norwegian music scene, including stints as chair of the Norwegian Society of Composers and chairman of the board of TONO. From 2009 to 2013, Berge served as director of Kristiansand Symphony Orchestra.

== Selected works ==
- Gagarin – a space opera commissioned by NRK (1991)
- Shimmer, for piano and chamber ensemble, commissioned by Grieg150thAnniversary Celebrations for the Bergen International Festival (1993)
- Nanawatai for percussion ensemble, commissioned by Ultima Oslo Contemporary Music Festival (1994)
- Indian Song Book concerto for soprano and orchestra, commissioned by Ultima Oslo Contemporary Music Festival (1996)
- Gåten Knut Hamsun soundtrack for motion picture and TV-series (1996)
- Chrotxo for percussion and chamber orchestra, commissioned by Nordnorsk Kammerorkester og Kroumata
- Bakkantinnene. Music drama work commissioned by Den Nationale Scene/Concerts Norway (1997)
- Concerto for Violi, Accordeon & Orchestra commissioned by Trondheim Symphony Orchestra (2000/2001)
- To Shakespeare-sonetter commissioned by The Norwegian Soloists' Choir (2000)
- Glass – a requiem commissioned by Den Nationale Scene (2000)
- Biblioteca Alexandrina work written for the opening of the Alexandria Library (2002)
- Nobel Peace Center. Work commissioned by and premiered at the opening of the Nobel Peace Centre (2005)
- Ibsen 2006 Opening Ceremony (2006)
- Fine Thing for trumpet and organ. Commissioned by Nordland Musikkfestuke for Tine Thing Helset and Bjørn Andor Drage (2007)
- Reflection & Prelude for chamber orchestra, commissioned by "Kyrkjelyd" – Sounds from the Cathedral) European Capital of Culture (2007)
- Brassblòt test piece for the 2008 European Brass Band Championship, commissioned by Norsk Musikkorps Forbund (2008)
- Du som lar meg stille vokse for kor og symfoniorkester. commissioned by De Internasjonale Kirkefestspill, Kristiansand (2011)
- No stig vår song, vår takk til Gud , 2013
- Et lys til åpenbaring, commissioned work for Kristiansand Solistensemble/Kilden Teater & Konserthus (2014)
- Organum Nidrosiense, commissioned by Nidaros Cathedral (2014)

== Discography ==
- KERYX – Underveis (1973)
- Gagarin – en romfartsopera av Håkon Berge (1996)
- Garman & Worse & Co (1997), with Espen Hana
- Voices and Drums (2003)
- Byterminalen (2008), with Gunnar Roalkvam

== Appears on ==
- Arnold Børud: Balladen om Jesus (1974)
- Rune Larsen: Ikke bare gospel (1975)
- Bjørn Eidsvåg: Inn for landing (1976)
- Terje Vallestad & Bjørn Kallevig: Vil du hørra? (1980)
- Hans Petter Hansen: Lady (1981)
- Various artists: Amelis sang (1984)
- Oslo Sinfonietta: Oslo Sinfonietta (album)|Oslo Sinfonietta (1993)
- BIT20 Ensemble: Norwegian Signatures (1995)
- Sigvart Dagsland: Laiv (1996)
- Stavanger Brass Band: The Colour-Gobbler (1996)
- SISU Percussion Ensemble: Nanawatai (1996)
- Norwegian Radio Orchestra: Gåten Knut Hamsun (1996)
- Various artists: Reisen til julestjernen – Hørespill fra Lørdagsbarnetimen (1998)
- Various artists: 21 Marches for the 21st Century (2000)
- Jan Kåre Hystad: Café Hysen Noir (2000)
- Sigvart Dagsland: Sigvarts favoritter (2001)
- Lewis Carroll: Alice i eventyrland – Hørespill fra Lørdagsbarnetimen (2002)
- Diverse: Fjord Focus: A Norwegian Sampler (2002)
- Det Norske Solistkor: Telling What Is Told (2006)
- Vamp: I full symfoni (2006)
- Sigvart Dagsland: Forandring (2007)
- Tønes: Sobihob (2009)
- Kvarts: Kvarts; Folkemusikk i Symfoni (2009)
- Øivind Farmen: Norwegian Safari (2010)
- Various Artists: Lukk opp kirkens dører; A Selection of Norwegian Christian Jazz, Psych, Funk & Folk 1970–1980 (2011)
- Uranienborg Vokalensemble & Elisabeth Holte: Uranienborg Vokalensemble-album (2013)
- Elin Furubotn: Å nærme seg det nære (2014)
- Norwegian Radio Orchestra, Anita Skorgan, Rim Banna, Sondre Bratland, Solveig Slettahjell and Rikard Wolff: Jul på orkesterplass (2015)
- Lars Lien: Phonetix (2016)
