= Jan-Olav Ingvaldsen =

Norwegian politician (1954–2021)

- Born: 12 January 1954; Fauske Municipality, Norway
- Died: 5 April 2021 (aged 67)
- Occupation: Politician

Jan-Olav Ingvaldsen (12 January 1954 – 5 April 2021) was a Norwegian politician.

He was born in Fauske Municipality to Albin I. Ingvaldsen and Gunvor M. Petersen. He was elected representative to the Storting for the period 1985–1989 for the Labour Party.

Ingvaldsen died on 5 April 2021, at 67 years old.
