= Cecilie Ore =

Norwegian composer (born 1954)

Cecilie Ore (born 19 July 1954) is a Norwegian composer.

== Biography ==
Cecilie Ore was born in Oslo, Norway, and studied piano at the Norwegian Academy of Music in Oslo. She also studied piano in Paris, and composition at the Institute of Sonology in Utrecht, and with Ton de Leeuw at the Sweelinck Conservatory in Amsterdam.

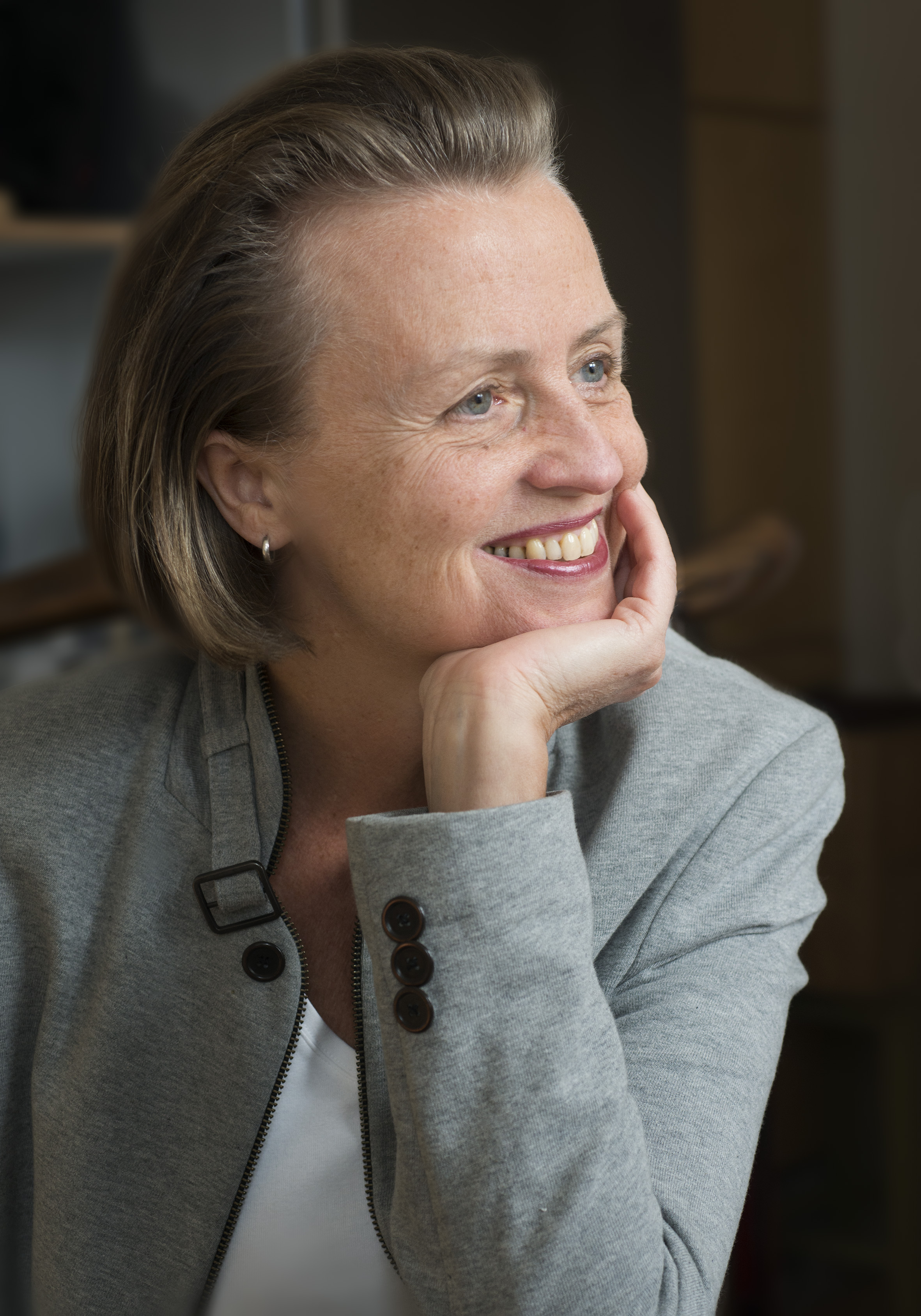
Photo: Ketil Born

During the eighties, Ore gained international acclaim for several of her electro-acoustic works. 1988 saw her winning both the first and second prize at the International Rostrum for Composers in the Electro Acoustic category for her work Etapper. The same year saw Ore bestowed with the Norwegian Society of Composers´ Work of the Year Award for the orchestral work Porphyre.

Towards the end of the 80s, Orce gradually introduced a compositional focus on time, a focus that would lead to work cycles Codex Temporis and Tempura Mutantur. Codex Temporis comprises works Praesens Subitus (for string quartet 1989), Futurum Exactum (for 12 strings 1992), Erat Erit Est (for sinfonietta 1991) and Lex Temporis (for string quartet 1992). The ideas presented in Codex Temporis were further developed in Tempura Mutantor which is made up of works Non Nunquam (for string trio 1999), Nunquam Non (for ensemble 1999), Semper Semper (for saxophone quartet 1998) and Ictus (for six percussionists 1997). Subsequent instrumental works constitute a trilogy in which all three works are given titles derived from various cloud formations: Cirrus (for string quartet 2002), Cirrocumulis (for wind trio 2002) and Cirrostratus (for sinfonietta 2004).

In 1994, Ore penned the orchestral work Nunc et Nunc, commissioned by the BBC Symphony Orchestra. During the eighties, Ore would also compose a number of vocal works, including Calliope (for female voice, 1984) which has seen frequent performances in the ensuing decades. Ore's vocal focus would continue with 2001's A – a shadow opera which was premiered at the Ultima Oslo Contemporary Music Festival and released in album format in 2003. The same year also saw Ore composing Schwirren, a work written for vocal ensemble Nordic Voices. 2005's Lux Illuxit, a sound-installation commissioned by the National Archives of Norway, also employs widespread use of texts and vocal materials.

Ore's post 2000 compositional output shows an increasing focus on text-based and socio-critical music with compositional themes spanning from capital punishment to freedom of speech. In 2008, the Norwegian National Opera and Ballet premiered her chamber opera Dead Beat Escapement. 2013 saw the performance of a work commissioned by BBC Radio 3 and the Huddersfield Contemporary Music Festival premiered at the hcmf in November. In spring 2015, Ore's opera Adam & Eve – a Divine Comedy was premiered at the Bergen International Festival. In March 2016, Ore's choir work Dead Pope on Trial! Saw a performance at the Other Minds Festival in San Francisco.

Ore was awarded the Arne Nordheim Composer's Price for 2004 and in 2015 she was bestowed with the Lindemanprisen.

== Honors and awards ==
- First and second prize at the International Rostrum for Electro-Acoustic Music, 1988.
- Composition of the Year award, Norwegian Society of Composers
- Norwegian State Guarantee Income for Artists
- Arne Nordheim Composers Price for 2004
- Lindemanprisen 2015

== Works ==
Ore writes electro-acoustic works and also traditional compositions for chamber ensemble, solo instrument and voice. Selected works include:

- Etapper (Stages), 1988
- Codex Temporis
- Tempura Mutantur
- Calliope for female voice, 1984
- Porphyre, 1988
- Nunc et Nunc, 1994
- A – a shadow opera, 2001
- Cirrus for string quartet, 2002
- Cirrocumulus for wind trio, 2002
- Schwirren for vocal ensemble, 2003
- Cirrostratus for sinfonietta, 2004
- Lux Illuxit sound-instrallation, 2005
- Dead Beat Escapement chamber opera, 2008
- Come to the Edge! (2013)
- Adam & Eve – a Divine Comedy (2015)
- Dead Pope on Trial (2016)
- The Fig Leaf Campaign! For vocal ensemble or choir (2017)
- The Pregnant Pope! For vocal ensemble or choir (2017)

Her work has been recorded and issued on CD, including:

- Tempura Mutantur (Non Nunquam, Nunquam Non, Semper Semper and Ictus), Frau Musica (nova)/Deutschland Radio.
- Codex Temporis (Praesens Subitus, Futurum Exactum Erat Erit Est, Lex Temporis), Aurora
- A – a shadow opera, Aurora 2003
- Nordic Voices, Aurora
- Cirrus, Fabra
- Sinus Seduction, Aurora
- Frau Musica (nova), Festival für neue Musik, Frau Musica
- Cikada, Aurora
- The Contemporary Solo Double Bass, Simax
- Talking/Singing, Albedo
