= Norwegian Consumer Council =

Norwegian government agency that protects consumer rights

The Consumer Council of Norway (Norwegian: Forbrukerrådet) is a Norwegian government agency and consumer protection organisation established in 1953. It works to increase consumer influence in society, to contribute to consumer-friendly developments, and to promote measures that strengthen the position of consumers. The Norwegian government funds the Consumer Council, leaving it free to develop an independent consumer policy and independent of commercial interests and other organisations.

== Structure ==
The Consumer Council has its own board of directors and statutes laid down by the Ministry of Children and Equality and is chaired by Director Inger Lise Blyverket. Approximately 80 people work at the Consumer Council's office in Oslo.

The Consumer Council helps put consumer questions on the agenda and promote consumers' interests by influencing authorities, organisations, and businesses; educating consumers through information, advice, and guidance; and helping individual consumers.

=== Consumer policy ===
The Consumer policy department runs the Consumer Council's work to influence governmental and business life in a consumer-friendly direction through dialogue, impact work and publications. The policy work is aimed at areas that have a high economic impact for consumers, where consumer satisfaction is low, and potentially could to affect all sectors.

In some cases, existing regulations are not enough, and the Consumer Council is therefore working politically to strengthen legal consumer protection. In other cases, the work is about affecting the competitive situation and how markets operate.

The Consumer Council also has an extensive international cooperation with sister organizations in Europe, and especially with the umbrella organization in Brussels; BEUC.

The priority policy areas of the Consumer Council are sustainability, digital services, and economic exclusion.

=== Assisting consumers ===
Each year, 50,000 consumers directly contact the Norwegian Consumer Council for assistance.

== Profiled cases ==
- On January 25, 2006, the Consumer Council filed a complaint regarding iTunes' Term of Service.
- On October 15, 2015 The Consumer Council filed a lawsuit against Norway's largest bank, DNB on behalf of 180,000 consumers.
- On May 25, 2016 The Consumer Council read app terms for 32 hours to demonstrate what reading the terms and conditions actually entails. The stunt gained world wide attention.
- On June 27, 2018, the Consumer Council of Norway published the report "Deceived by Design - How Tech Companies Use Dark Patterns to Discourage Us from Exercising Our Rights to Privacy" which provides examples of how Google, Facebook and Microsoft nudges users into choosing the less privacy friendly options. The report is part of the campaign Manipulativ Design, which also includes a more in-depth report on Google's usage of deceptive design.
- On January 14, 2020 the Consumer Council of Norway published the report "Out of control - How consumers are exploited by the online advertising industry" which details the use of personal data collection and profiling for digital marketing. Technical tests of 10 popular apps revealed these alone were transmitting user data to at least 135 different third parties involved in advertising and/or behavioural profiling. The report was made as part of a larger campaign Out of Control containing several articles, an accompanying comprehensive technical report covering their methodology and detailed findings, as well as updates to their filed complaints.
- In June, 2021, they published a report, "Time to Ban Surveillance Based Advertising" detailing the socially detrimental effects of surveillance advertising and a call for it to be banned.
- In May, 2022, they published another report, "INSERT COIN - How the gaming industry exploits consumers using loot boxes" concerning a wide variety of problems with the marketing and use of loot box mechanics in video games, and a call for the use of loot boxes to be far more regulated or potentially banned.
- On June 20, 2023, they published "GHOST IN THE MACHINE - Addressing the consumer harms of generative AI" along with a release day webinar on the topic. The report has been written about in several outlets participating in the public debate about the rise of generative AI, such as Tech Report, Computer Weekly, and the Business & Human Rights Resource Centre. As of January 2024, their work on AI is ongoing and listed as a larger campaign Generative AI sidelined with the earlier campaigns Manipulativ Design and Out of Control.
